= History of Poland (1795–1918) =

From 1795 to 1918, Poland was split between Prussia, the Habsburg monarchy, and Russia and had no independent existence. In 1795 the third and the last of the three 18th-century partitions of Poland ended the existence of the Polish–Lithuanian Commonwealth. Nevertheless, events both within and outside the Polish lands kept hopes for restoration of Polish independence alive throughout the 19th century. Poland's geopolitical location on the Northern European Lowlands became especially important in a period when its expansionist neighbors, the Kingdom of Prussia and Imperial Russia, involved themselves intensely in European rivalries and alliances as modern nation-states took form over the entire continent.

== The Napoleonic period ==
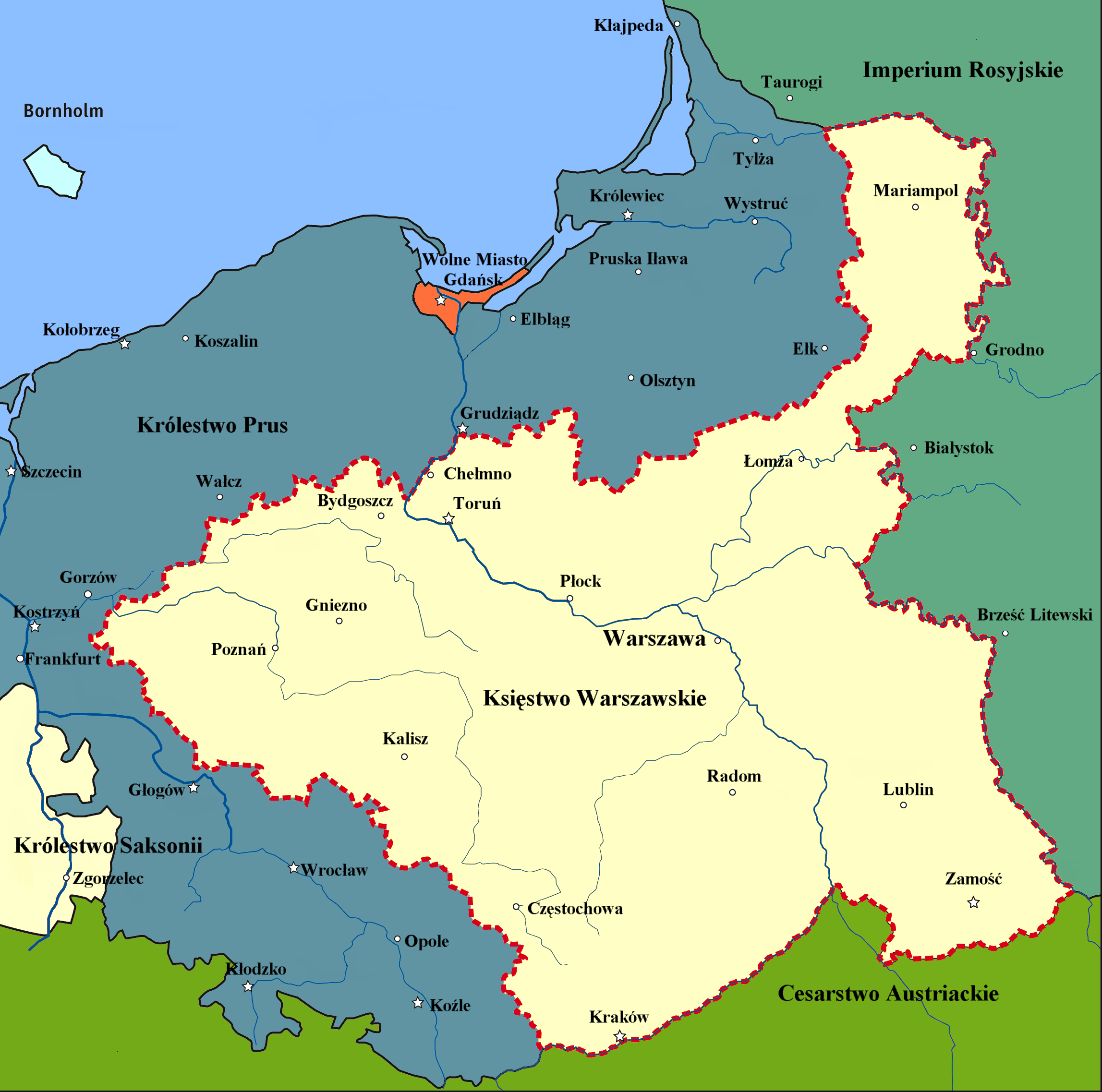
Napoleon's Duchy of Warsaw (1807–1815)

At the turn of the 19th century, Europe had begun to feel the impact of momentous political and intellectual movements that, among their other effects, would keep the "Polish Question" on the agenda of international issues needing resolution. Most immediately, Napoleon Bonaparte had established a new empire in France in 1804 following that country's revolution. Other powers' refusal of the new status of France kept Europe at war for the next decade and brought him into conflict with the same east European powers that had beleaguered Poland in the last decades of the previous century. An alliance of convenience was the natural result of this situation. Volunteer Polish legions attached themselves to Bonaparte's armies, hoping that in return the emperor would allow an independent Poland to reappear out of his conquests.

Although Napoleon promised more than he ever intended to deliver to the Polish cause, in 1807 he created a Duchy of Warsaw from Prussian territory that had been part of old Poland and was still inhabited by Poles. Basically a French puppet, the duchy did enjoy some degree of self-government, and many Poles believed that further Napoleonic victories would bring restoration of the entire commonwealth.

In 1809, under Jozef Poniatowski, nephew of Stanislaw II August, the duchy reclaimed some of the territories taken by Austria in the third partition. The Russian Army occupied the duchy as it chased Napoleon out of Russia in 1813, however, and Polish expectations ended with the final defeat of Napoleon at Waterloo in 1815. In the subsequent peace settlement of the Congress of Vienna, the victorious Austrians and Prussians swept away the Duchy of Warsaw and reconfirmed most of the terms of the final partition of Poland.

Although brief, the Napoleonic period occupies an important place in Polish history. Much of the legend and symbolism of modern Polish patriotism derives from this period, including the conviction that Polish independence is a necessary element of a just and legitimate European order. This conviction was simply expressed in a fighting slogan of the time, "for your freedom and ours."

Moreover, the appearance of the Duchy of Warsaw so soon after the partitions proved that the seemingly final historical death sentence delivered in 1795 was not necessarily the end of the Polish nation-state. Instead, many observers came to believe that favourable circumstances would free Poland from foreign domination.

== The impact of nationalism and romanticism ==
The intellectual and artistic climate of the early 19th century further stimulated the growth of Polish demands for self-government. During these decades, modern nationalism took shape and rapidly developed a massive following throughout the continent, becoming the most dynamic and appealing political doctrine of its time. By stressing the value and dignity of native cultures and languages, nationalism offered a rationale for ethnic loyalty and Romanticism was the artistic element of 19th-century European culture that exerted the strongest influence on the Polish national consciousness. The Romantic movement was a natural partner of political nationalism, for it echoed the nationalist sympathy for folk cultures and manifested a general air of disdain for the conservative political order of post-Napoleonic Europe. Under this influence, Polish literature flourished anew in the works of a school of 19th-century Romantic poets, led by Adam Mickiewicz. Mickiewicz concentrated on patriotic themes and the glorious national past. Frédéric Chopin, a leading composer of the century, also used the tragic history of his nation as a major inspiration.

Nurtured by these influences, nationalism awoke first among the intelligentsia and certain segments of the nobility, then more gradually in the peasantry. At the end of the process, a broader definition of nationhood had replaced the old class-based "noble patriotism" of Poland.

== The era of national insurrections ==
For several decades, the Polish national movement gave priority to the immediate restoration of independence, a drive that found expression in a series of armed rebellions. The insurgencies arose mainly in the Russian zone of partition to the east, about three-quarters of which was formerly Polish territory. After the Congress of Vienna, Russia had organized its Polish lands as the Congress Poland, granting it a quite liberal constitution, its own army, and limited autonomy within the tsarist empire. In the 1820s, however, Russian rule grew more arbitrary, and secret societies were formed by intellectuals in several cities to plot an insurrection. In November 1830, Polish troops in Warsaw rose in revolt. When the government of Congress Poland proclaimed solidarity with the rebel forces shortly thereafter, a new Polish-Russian war began. The rebels' requests for aid from France were ignored, and their reluctance to abolish serfdom cost them the support of the peasantry. By September 1831, the Russians had subdued Polish resistance and forced 6,000 resistance fighters into exile in France, beginning a time of harsh repression of intellectual and religious activity throughout Poland. At the same time, Congress Poland lost its constitution and its army.

After the failure of the November Revolt, clandestine conspiratorial activity continued on Polish territory. An exiled Polish political and intellectual elite established a base of operations in Paris. A conservative group headed by Adam Jerzy Czartoryski (one of the leaders of the November Revolt) relied on foreign diplomatic support to restore Poland's status as established by the Congress of Vienna, which Russia had routinely violated beginning in 1819. Otherwise, this group was satisfied with a return to monarchy and traditional social structures.

The radical factions never formed a united front on any issue besides the general goal of independence. Their programs insisted that the Poles liberate themselves by their own efforts and linked independence with republicanism and the emancipation of the serfs. Handicapped by internal division, limited resources, heavy surveillance, and persecution of revolutionary cells in Poland, the Polish national movement suffered numerous losses. The movement sustained a major setback in the 1846 revolt organized in Austrian Poland by the Polish Democratic Society, the leading radical nationalist group. The uprising ended in a bloody fiasco when the peasantry took up arms against the rebel leadership dominated by nobility and gentry, which was regarded as potentially a worse oppressor than the Austrians. By incurring harsh military repression from Austria, the failed revolt left the Polish nationalists in a poor position to participate in the wave of national revolution that crossed Europe in 1848 and 1849. The stubborn idealism of this uprising's leaders emphasized individual liberty and separate national identity rather than establishment of a unified republic—a significant change of political philosophy from earlier movements.

The last and most tenacious of the Polish uprisings of the mid-19th century erupted in the Russian-occupied sector in January 1863 (see January Uprising). Following Russia's disastrous defeat in the Crimean War, the government of Tsar Alexander II enacted a series of liberal reforms, including liberation of the serfs throughout the empire. The high-handed imposition of land reforms in Poland aroused hostility among the conservative landed nobility on the one hand, and a group of young radical intellectuals influenced by Karl Marx and the Russian liberal Alexander Herzen, on the other. Repeating the pattern of 1830–31, the open revolt of the January Insurrection by Congress Poland failed to win foreign backing. Although its socially progressive program could not mobilize the peasants, the rebellion persisted stubbornly for fifteen months. After finally crushing the insurgency in August 1864, Russia abolished the Congress Poland altogether and revoked the separate status of the Polish lands, incorporating them directly as the Western Region of the Russian Empire. The region was placed under the dictatorial rule of Mikhail Muravyov-Vilensky, who became known as the Hangman of Vilnius. All Polish citizens were assimilated into the empire. When Russia officially emancipated the Polish serfs in early 1864, an act that constituted the most important event in history of nineteenth-century Poland, it removed a major rallying point from the agenda of potential Polish revolutionaries.

== The time of "Organic Work" ==
Increasing oppression at Russian hands after failed national uprisings finally convinced Polish leaders that the recent insurrection was premature. During the decades that followed the January Insurrection, Poles largely forsook the goal of immediate independence and turned instead to fortifying the nation through the subtler means of education, economic development, and modernization. This approach took the name "Organic Work" (Praca organiczna) for its philosophy of strengthening Polish society at the grass roots, influenced by positivism. For some, the adoption of Organic Work meant permanent resignation to foreign rule, but many advocates recommended it as a strategy to combat repression while awaiting an eventual opportunity to achieve self-government.

Neither as colorful as the rebellions nor as loftily enshrined in national memory, the quotidian methods of Organic Work proved well suited to the political conditions of the later 19th century. The international balance of forces did not favour the recovery of statehood when both Russia and Germany appeared bent on the eventual eradication of Polish national identity. The German Empire, established in 1871 as an expanded version of the Prussian state, aimed at the assimilation of its eastern provinces inhabited by Poles. At the same time, St. Petersburg attempted to russify the former Congress Poland, joining Berlin in levying restrictions against use of the Polish language and cultural expression. Poles under Russian and German rule also endured official campaigns against the Roman Catholic Church: the Cultural Struggle (Kulturkampf) of Chancellor Otto von Bismarck to bring the Catholic Church under state control and the Russian campaign to extend Orthodoxy throughout the empire.

The Polish subjects under Austrian jurisdiction (after 1867 the Habsburg Empire was commonly known as Austria-Hungary) confronted a generally more lenient regime. Poles suffered no religious persecution in predominantly Catholic Austria, and Vienna counted on the Polish nobility as allies in the complex political calculus of its multinational realm. In return for loyalty, Austrian Poland, or Galicia, received considerable administrative and cultural autonomy. Galicia gained a reputation as an oasis of toleration amidst the oppression of German and Russian Poland. The Galician provincial Sejm acted as a semiautonomous parliamentary body, and Poles represented the region in the empire government in Vienna. In the late 19th century, the universities of Kraków and Lviv became the centers of Polish intellectual activity, and Kraków became the center of Polish art and thought. Even after the restoration of independence, many residents of southern Poland retained a touch of nostalgia for the days of the Habsburg Empire.

== Social and political transformation ==
Profound social and economic forces operated on the Polish lands throughout the late 19th century, giving them a more modern aspect and altering traditional patterns of life. Especially in Russian Poland and the Silesian regions under German control, mining and manufacturing started on a large scale. This development sped the process of urbanization, and the emergence of capitalism began to reduce the relative importance of the landed aristocracy in Polish society. A considerable segment of the peasantry abandoned the overburdened land. Millions of Poles emigrated to North America and other destinations, and millions more migrated to cities to form the new industrial labour force. These shifts stimulated fresh social tensions. Urban workers bore the full range of hardships associated with early capitalism, and the intensely nationalistic atmosphere of the day bred frictions between Poles and the other peoples remaining from the old heterogeneous Commonwealth of Two Nations. The movement of the former noble class into cities created a new urban professional class.

These transformations changed the face of politics as well, giving rise to new parties and movements that would dominate the Polish landscape for the next century. The grievances of the lower classes led to the formation of peasant and socialist parties. Communism gained only a marginal following, but a more moderate socialist faction led by Józef Piłsudski won broader support through its emphatic advocacy of Polish independence. By 1905 Piłsudski's party, the Polish Socialist Party, was the largest socialist party in the entire Russian Empire. The National Democracy of Roman Dmowski became the leading vehicle of the right by espousing a doctrine that combined nationalism with hostility toward Jews and other minorities. By the turn of the 20th century, Polish political life had emerged from the relative quiescence of Organic Work and entered a stage of renewed assertiveness. In particular, Piłsudski and Dmowski had initiated what would be long careers as the paramount figures in the civic affairs of Poland. After 1900 political activity was suppressed only in the Prussian sector.

== First World War ==
At the outbreak of the First World War Poland's geographical position between Germany and Russia had meant much fighting and horrific human and material losses for the Poles between 1914 and 1918. At the Treaty of Brest-Litovsk in spring 1918, revolutionary Russia renounced Russian claims to Poland. Following the German defeat and the replacement of Hohenzollern rule by the Weimar Republic and the collapse of Habsburg Austria-Hungary, Poland became an independent republic.

=== War and the Polish lands ===
The war split the ranks of the three partitioning empires, pitting Russia as defender of Serbia and ally of Britain and France against the leading members of the Central Powers, Germany and Austria-Hungary. This circumstance afforded the Poles political leverage as both sides offered pledges of concessions and future autonomy in exchange for Polish loyalty and army recruits. The Austrians wanted to incorporate Congress Poland into their territory of Galicia, so even before the war they allowed nationalist organisations to form there (for example, Związek Strzelecki). The Russians recognized the Polish right to autonomy and allowed formation of the Polish National Committee, which supported the Russian side. In 1916, attempting to increase Polish support for the Central Powers and to raise a Polish army the German and Austrian emperors declared a new Kingdom of Poland, (see Regency Kingdom of Poland (1916–1918). The new Kingdom consisted only of a small part of the old Commonwealth, i.e. the territory of Congress Poland, although some promises were made about a future incorporation of Vilna and Minsk. The Kingdom was ruled by three Regents, possessed a Parliament and a Government, a small army and its own currency, called the Polish mark. The Regency Kingdom was the fourth and last monarchy in Poland's history.

As the war settled into a long stalemate, the issue of Polish self-rule gained greater urgency. Roman Dmowski spent the war years in Western Europe, hoping to persuade the Allies to unify the Polish lands under Russian rule as an initial step toward liberation. In the meantime, Piłsudski had correctly predicted that the war would ruin all three of the partitioners, a conclusion most people thought highly unlikely before 1918. Piłsudski therefore formed the Polish Legions to assist the Central Powers in defeating Russia as the first step toward full independence for Poland.

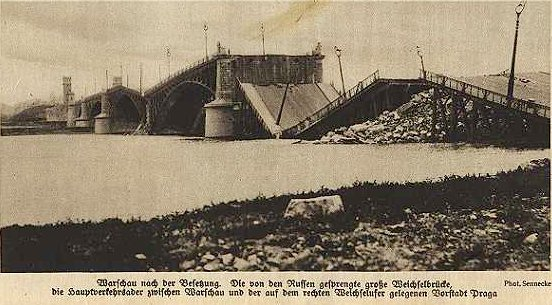
Poniatowski Bridge in Warsaw after being blown up by the retreating Russian Army in 1915.

Much of the heavy fighting on the war's Eastern Front took place on the territory of the former Polish state. In 1914 Russian forces advanced very close to Kraków before being beaten back. The next spring, heavy fighting occurred around Gorlice and Przemyśl, to the east of Kraków in Galicia. In 1915 Polish territories were looted and abandoned by the retreating Russian army, trying to emulate the scorched earth policy of 1812; the Russians also evicted and deported hundreds of thousands of its inhabitants suspected of collaborating with the enemy. By the end of 1915, the Germans had occupied the entire Russian sector, including Warsaw. In 1916 another Russian offensive in Galicia exacerbated the already desperate situation of civilians in the war zone; about 1 million Polish refugees fled eastward behind Russian lines during the war. Although the Russian offensive of 1916 caught the Germans and Austrians by surprise, poor communications and logistics prevented the Russians from taking full advantage of their situation.

A total of 2 million Polish troops fought with the armies of the three occupying powers, and 450,000 died. Several hundred thousand Polish civilians were moved to labour camps in Germany. The scorched-earth retreat strategies of both sides left much of the war zone uninhabitable.

=== Recovery of statehood ===
In 1917 two separate events decisively changed the character of the war and set it on a course toward the rebirth of Poland. The United States entered the conflict on the Allied side, while a process of revolutionary upheaval in Russia weakened her and then removed the Russians from the Eastern Front, finally bringing the Bolsheviks to power in that country. The army of Tsarist Russia ceased to be a factor when the Bolsheviks pulled Russia out of the war. At Brest-Litovsk the Bolsheviks renounced Russian claims to Poland. Compelled by force of German arms to sign the Treaty of Brest-Litovsk all formerly Polish lands were ceded to the Central Powers. After the German defeat in the Fall of 1918; the overthrow of the Prussian Monarchy and its replacement by the liberal Weimar Republic, the road to an independent Polish state was opened.

The vacating of both Russia and Germany from Poland gave free rein to the calls of Woodrow Wilson at the Versailles Peace Conference, echoing those of the new Bolshevik regime, to liberate the Poles and other peoples from Greater Power suzerainty. The thirteenth of Wilson's Fourteen Points adopted the resurrection of Poland as one of the main aims of the First World War.

Józef Piłsudski became a popular hero when Berlin jailed him for insubordination. The Allies broke the resistance of the Central Powers by autumn 1918, as the Habsburg monarchy disintegrated and the German imperial government collapsed. In October 1918, Polish authorities took over Galicia and Cieszyn Silesia. In November 1918, Piłsudski was released from internment in Germany by the revolutionaries and returned to Warsaw. Upon his arrival, on 11 November 1918 the Regency Council of the Kingdom of Poland ceded all responsibilities to him and Piłsudski took control over the newly created state as its provisional Chief of State. Soon all the local governments that had been created in the last months of the war pledged allegiance to the central government in Warsaw. Independent Poland, which had been absent from the map of Europe for 123 years, was reborn.

The newly created state initially consisted of former Congress Poland, western Galicia and part of Cieszyn Silesia. Lwów was contested between Poland and Ukraine.
