= Curzon Line =

Historical demarcation of territories of Poland and the Soviet Union

- Historical demarcation line of World War I further ~ Soviet-Polish border after World War II.
- Lighter blue line: Curzon Line "B" as proposed in 1919. Darker blue line: "Curzon" Line "A" as drawn by Lewis Namier in 1919. Pink areas: Pre–World War II provinces of Germany transferred to Poland after the war. Grey area: Pre–World War II Polish territory east of the Curzon Line annexed by the Soviet Union after the war.

The Curzon Line was a proposed demarcation line between the Second Polish Republic and the Soviet Union, two new states emerging after World War I. Based on a suggestion by Herbert James Paton, it was first proposed in 1919 by Lord Curzon, the British Foreign Secretary, to the Supreme War Council as a diplomatic basis for a future border agreement.

The line became a major geopolitical factor during World War II, when the USSR invaded eastern Poland, resulting in the split of Poland's territory between the USSR and Nazi Germany roughly along the Curzon Line in accordance with final rounds of secret negotiations surrounding the Molotov–Ribbentrop Pact. After the German attack on the Soviet Union in 1941, Operation Barbarossa, the Allies did not agree that Poland's future eastern border should be changed from the pre-war status quo in 1939 until the Tehran Conference. Churchill's position changed after the Soviet victory at the Battle of Kursk.

Following a private agreement at the Tehran Conference, confirmed at the 1945 Yalta Conference, the Allied leaders Franklin Roosevelt, Winston Churchill, and Stalin issued a statement affirming the use of the Curzon Line, with some five-to-eight-kilometre variations, as the eastern border between Poland and the Soviet Union. When Churchill proposed to annex parts of Eastern Galicia, including the city of Lviv, to Poland's territory (following Line B), Stalin argued that the Soviet Union could not demand less territory for itself than the British Government had reconfirmed previously several times. The Allied arrangement involved compensation for this loss via the incorporation of formerly German areas (the so-called Recovered Territories) into Poland. As a result, the current border between Poland and the countries of Belarus and Ukraine is an approximation of the Curzon Line.

== Early history ==
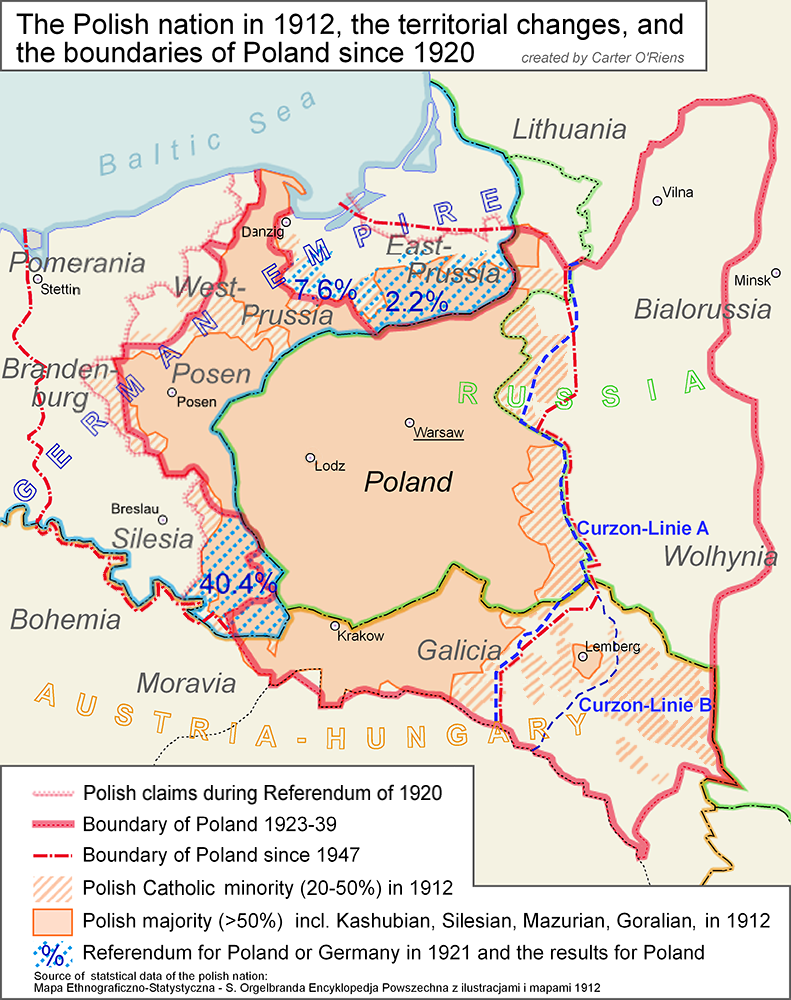
Polish pre-WWI ethnographic boundaries and territorial claims

At the end of World War I, the Second Polish Republic reclaimed its sovereignty following the disintegration of the occupying forces of three neighbouring empires. Imperial Russia was amid the Russian Civil War after the October Revolution, Austria-Hungary split and went into decline, and the German Reich bowed to pressure from the victorious forces of the Allies of World War I. The Allied victors agreed that an independent Polish state should be recreated from territories previously part of the Russian, the Austro-Hungarian and the German empires, after 123 years of upheavals and military partitions by them.

The Supreme War Council tasked the Commission on Polish Affairs with recommending Poland's eastern border, based on spoken language majority, which became later known as the Curzon Line. Their result was created December 8, 1919. The proposed line broadly corresponded to ethnographic divisions between predominantly Polish-speaking territories and eastern regions populated mainly by Ukrainians, Belarusians and Lithuanians, as later reflected in demographic data from the 1931 Polish census. The Allies forwarded it as an armistice line several times during the subsequent Polish-Soviet Wars, most notably in a note from the British government to the Soviets signed by Lord Curzon of Kedleston, the British Foreign Secretary. Both parties disregarded the line when the military situation lay in their favour, and it did not play a role in establishing the Polish–Soviet border in 1921. Instead, the final Peace of Riga (or Treaty of Riga) provided Poland with almost 135,000 square kilometres (52,000 sq mi) of land that was, on average, about 250 kilometres (160 mi) east of the Curzon Line.

=== Characteristics ===
The Northern half of the Curzon Line lay approximately along the border which was established between the Kingdom of Prussia and the Russian Empire in 1797, after the Third Partition of Poland, which was the last border recognised by the United Kingdom. Along most of its length, the line at least in principle was intended to follow a generally ethnic or ethnolinguistic boundary - areas West of the line generally contained an overall Polish majority while areas to its East less so- borderland areas were inhabited by Ukrainians, Belarusians, Poles, Jews and Lithuanians. Its 1920 northern extension into Lithuania divided the area disputed between Poland and Lithuania. There were two versions of the southern portion of the line: "A" and "B". Version "B" allocated Lwów (Lviv) to Poland.

== End of World War I ==
The US President Woodrow Wilson's Fourteen Points included the statement "An independent Polish state should be erected which should include the territories inhabited by indisputably Polish populations, which should be assured a free and secure access to the sea..." Article 87 of the Versailles Treaty stipulated that "The boundaries of Poland not laid down in the present Treaty will be subsequently determined by the Principal Allied and Associated Powers." In accordance with these declarations, the Supreme War Council tasked the Commission on Polish Affairs with proposing Poland's eastern boundaries in lands that were inhabited by a mixed population of Poles, Lithuanians, Ukrainians and Belarusians. The Commission issued its recommendation on 22 April; its proposed Russo-Polish borders were close to those of the 19th-century Congress Poland.

The Supreme Council continued to debate the issue for several months. On 8 December, the Council published a map and description of the line along with an announcement that it recognized "Poland's right to organize a regular administration of the territories of the former Russian Empire situated to the West of the line described below." At the same time, the announcement stated the Council was not "...prejudging the provisions which must in the future define the eastern frontiers of Poland" and that "the rights that Poland may be able to establish over the territories situated to the East of the said line are expressly reserved." The announcement had no immediate impact, although the Allies recommended its consideration in an August 1919 proposal to Poland, which was ignored.

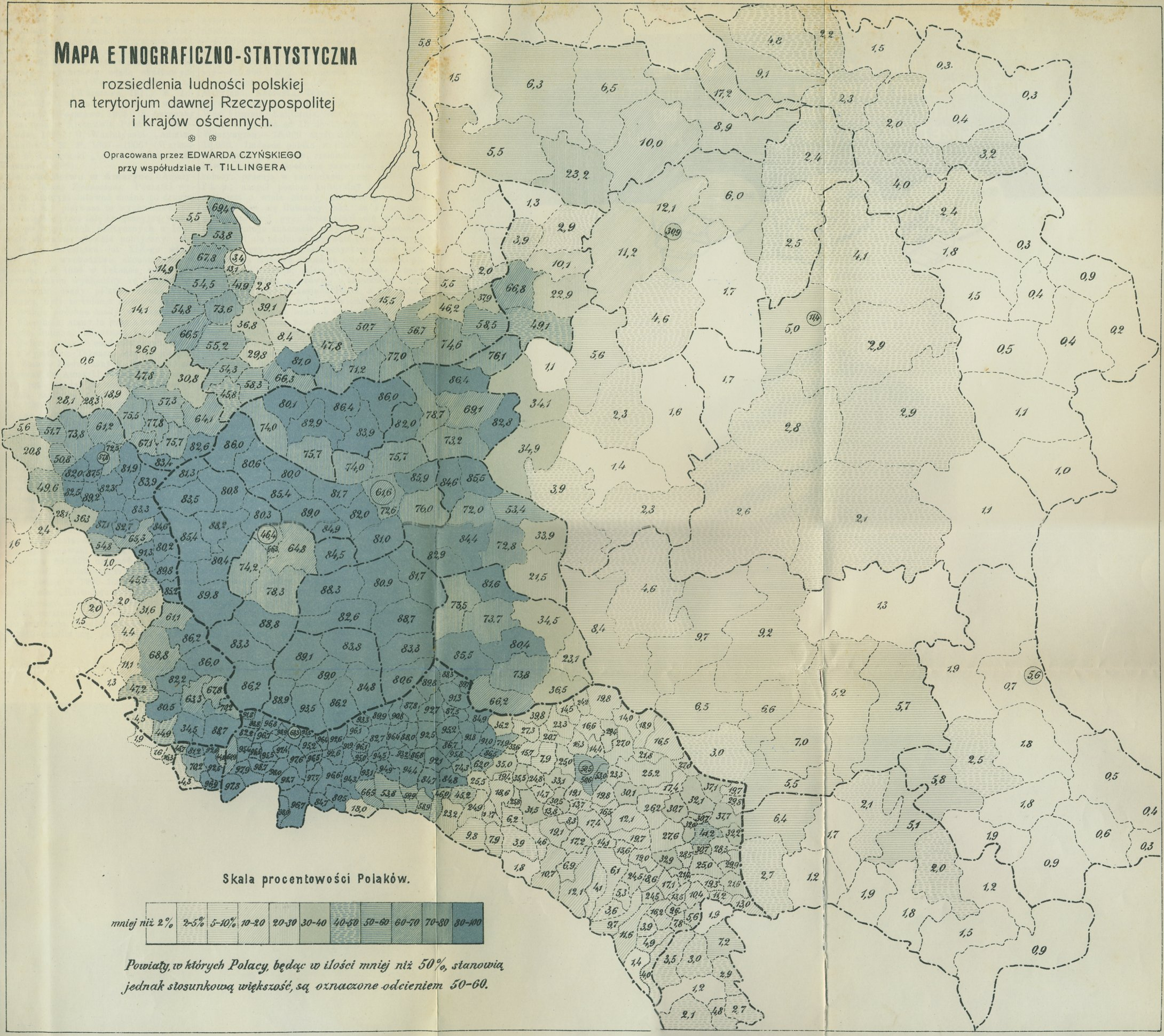
Polish ethnographic map from 1912, showing the proportions of Polish population according to pre-WW1 censuses

Polish ethnographic map showing the proportions of Polish population (incorporates data from pre-WW1 censuses and the 1916 census)

== Polish–Soviet War of 1919–1921 ==
Polish forces pushed eastward, taking Kiev in May 1920. Following a strong Soviet counteroffensive, Prime Minister Władysław Grabski sought Allied assistance in July. Under pressure, he agreed to a Polish withdrawal to the 1919 version of the line and, in Galicia, an armistice near the current line of battle. On 11 July 1920, Curzon signed a telegram sent to the Bolshevik government proposing that a ceasefire be established along the line, and his name was subsequently associated with it.

Curzon's July 1920 proposal differed from the 19 December announcement in two significant ways. The December note did not address the issue of Galicia, since it had been a part of the Austrian Empire rather than the Russian, nor did it address the Polish-Lithuanian dispute over the Vilnius Region, since those borders were demarcated at the time by the Foch Line. The July 1920 note specifically addressed the Polish-Lithuanian dispute by mentioning a line running from Grodno to Vilnius (Wilno) and thence north to Daugavpils, Latvia (Dynaburg). It also mentioned Galicia, where earlier discussions had resulted in the alternatives of Line A and Line B. The note endorsed Line A, which included Lwów and its nearby oil fields within Russia. This portion of the line did not correspond to the current line of battle in Galicia, as per Grabski's agreement, and its inclusion in the July note has lent itself to disputation.

On 17 July, the Soviets responded to the note with a refusal. Georgy Chicherin, representing the Soviets, commented on the delayed interest of the British for a peace treaty between Russia and Poland. He agreed to start negotiations as long as the Polish side asked for it. The Soviet side at that time offered more favourable border solutions to Poland than the ones offered by the Curzon Line. In August the Soviets were defeated by the Poles just outside Warsaw and forced to retreat. During the ensuing Polish offensive, the Polish government repudiated Grabski's agreement with regard to the line on the grounds that the Allies had not delivered support or protection.

=== Peace of Riga ===
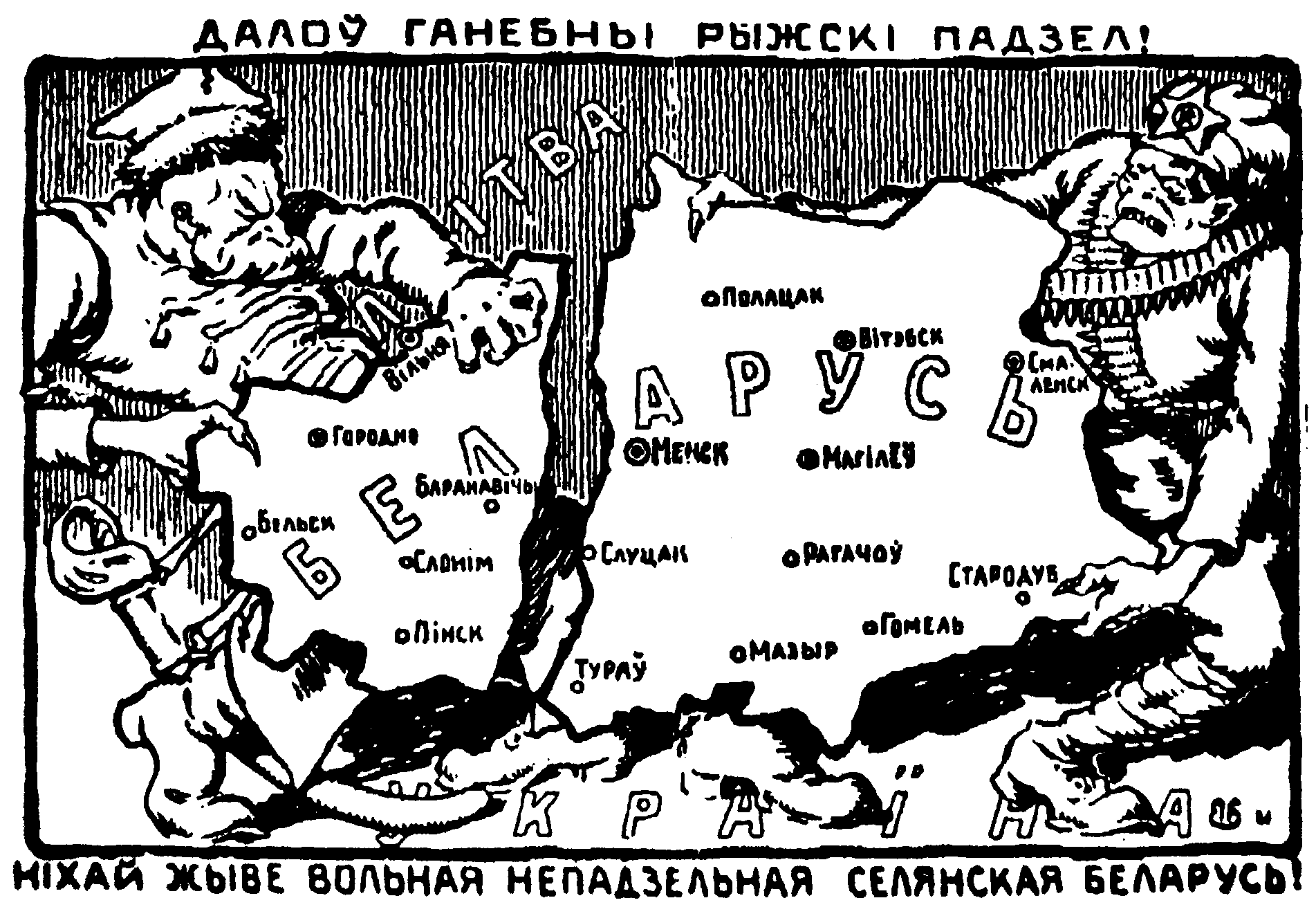
Belarusian Caricature: "Down with the infamous Riga partition! Long live a free peasant indivisible Belarus!"

At the March 1921 Treaty of Riga the Soviets conceded a frontier well to the east of the Curzon Line, where Poland had conquered a great part of the Vilna Governorate (1920/1922), including the town of Wilno (Vilnius), and East Galicia (1919), including the city of Lwów, as well as most of the region of Volhynia (1921). The treaty provided Poland with almost 135,000 square kilometres (52,000 sq mi) of land that was, on average, about 250 kilometres (160 mi) east of the Curzon Line. The Polish-Soviet border was recognised by the League of Nations in 1923 and confirmed by various Polish-Soviet agreements. Within the annexed regions, Poland founded several administrative districts, such as the Volhynian Voivodeship, the Polesie Voivodeship, and the Wilno Voivodeship.

As a concern of possible expansion of Polish territory, Polish politicians traditionally could be subdivided into two opposite groups advocating contrary approaches: restoration of Poland based on its former western territories one side and, alternatively, restoration of Poland based on its previous holdings in the east on the other.

During the first quarter of the 20th century, a representative of the first political group was Roman Dmowski, an adherent of the pan-slavistic movement and author of several political books and publications of some importance, who approached the issue pragmatically, but advocating for incorporation of available land based on a ethnographic principle combined with a theory of easy assimilation of Belarusians within a centralised Polish state- the task potentially to be shared with Russia concerning Belarusians beyond the border which he viewed it would be possible to incorporate and assimilate.

This resulted in a modification of the Dmowski Line in negotiations for the Treaty of Riga, in which the Polish delegation (consisting of a majority of parliamentary representatives, Dmowski’s Zjednoczenie Ludowo-Narodowe being the strongest party) unilaterally ceding claims to the Minsk area without basis on the line of actual control, and despite it having a higher Polish-identified population (in absolute and proportionally) than many of the areas still claimed within the border. The goal is thought to be jeopardising Józef Piłsudski’s ambitions for creating a Polish-Belarusian federation, as a remnant of his ‘federationist idea’ (opposed to Dmowski’s ‘incorporation its idea’) with a Belarusian capital in Minsk. It was predicted that a Belarusian entity without Minsk would be deemed politically illegitimate and untenable to the local population. An anti-communist, but believing in the inevitability of a White victory in the Russian Civil War he wished to concentrate on resisting a more dangerous enemy of the Polish nation than Russia, which in his view was Germany.

The most powerful representative of the opposed group was Józef Piłsudski, a former socialist who was born in the Vilna Governorate annexed during the 1795 Third Partition of Poland by the Russian Empire, whose political vision was essentially a far-reaching restoration of the borders of the Polish–Lithuanian Commonwealth, ideally in the form of a multinational federation. Because the Russian Empire had collapsed into a state of civil war following the Russian Revolution of 1917, and the Soviet Army had been defeated and been weakened considerably at the end of World War I by Germany's army, resulting in the Treaty of Brest-Litovsk, Piłsudski took the chance and used military force in an attempt to realise his political vision by concentrating on the east and involving himself in the Polish–Soviet War.

== World War II ==
The terms of the Molotov–Ribbentrop Pact of August 1939 provided for the partition of Poland along the line of the San, Vistula and Narew rivers which reached beyond the Curzon Line in certain sectors, and awarded the Soviet Union with cities such as Białystok and Przemyśl. In September, after the military defeat of Poland, the Soviet Union annexed all territories east of the Curzon Line plus Białystok and Eastern Galicia. The territories east of this line were incorporated into the Byelorussian SSR and Ukrainian SSR after falsified referendums and hundreds of thousands of Poles and a lesser number of Jews were deported eastwards into the Soviet Union. In July 1941 these territories were seized by Nazi Germany in the course of the invasion of the Soviet Union. During the German occupation most of the Jewish population was deported or killed by the Germans.

In 1944, the Soviet armed forces recaptured eastern Poland from the Germans. The Soviets unilaterally declared a new frontier between the Soviet Union and Poland (approximately the same as the Curzon Line). The Polish government-in-exile in London bitterly opposed this, insisting on the "Riga line". At the Tehran and Yalta conferences between Stalin and the western Allies, the allied leaders Roosevelt and Churchill asked Stalin to reconsider, particularly over Lwów, but he refused. During the negotiations at Yalta, Stalin posed the question "Do you want me to tell the Russian people that I am less Russian than Lord Curzon?" The altered Curzon Line thus became the permanent eastern border of Poland and was recognised by the western Allies in July 1945. The border was later adjusted several times, the biggest revision being in 1951.

When the Soviet Union ceased to exist in 1991, the Curzon Line became Poland's eastern border with Lithuania, Belarus and Ukraine.

== Ethnicity east of the Curzon Line until 1939 ==
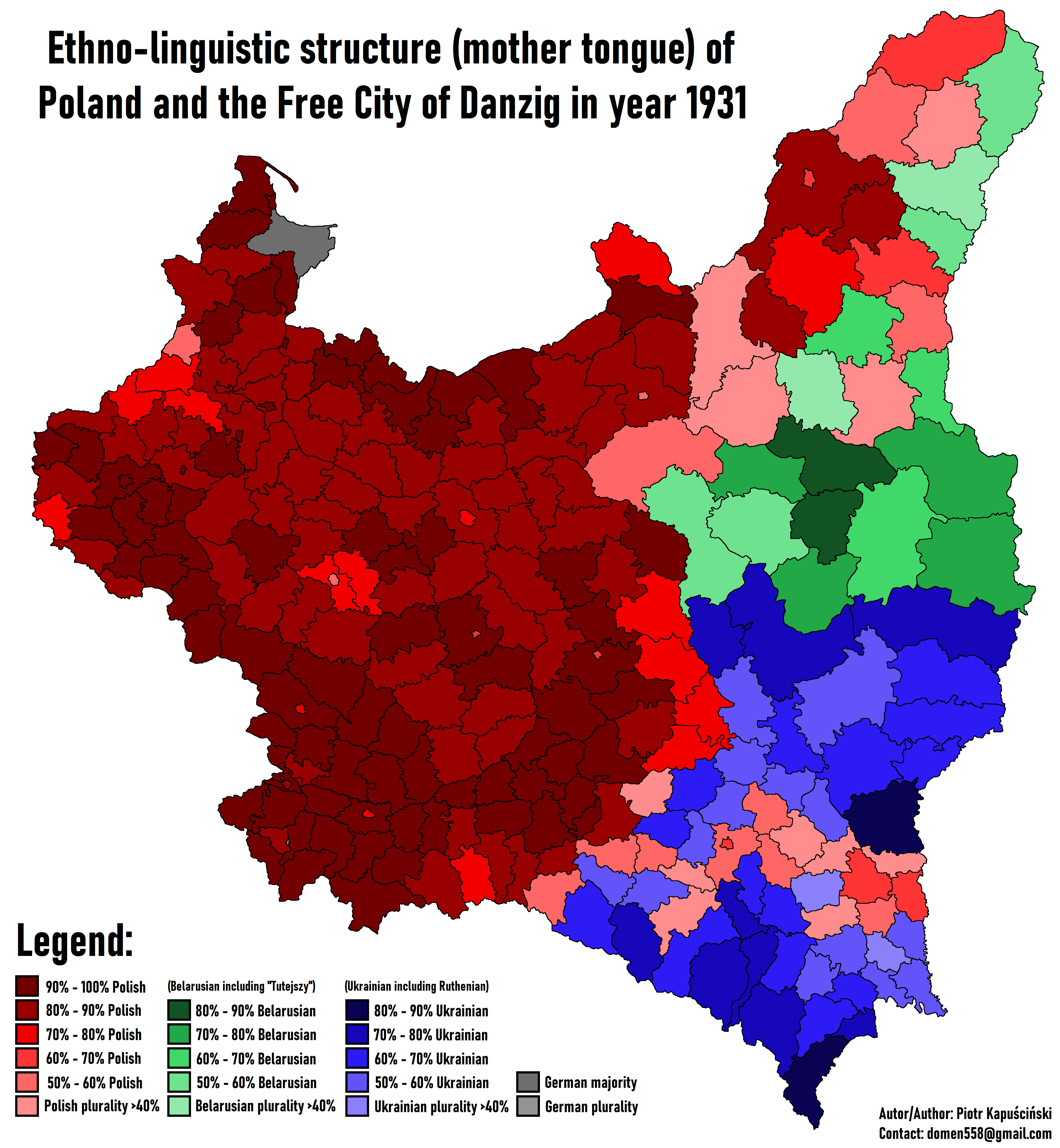
Linguistic map of Poland according to the 1931 Polish census.

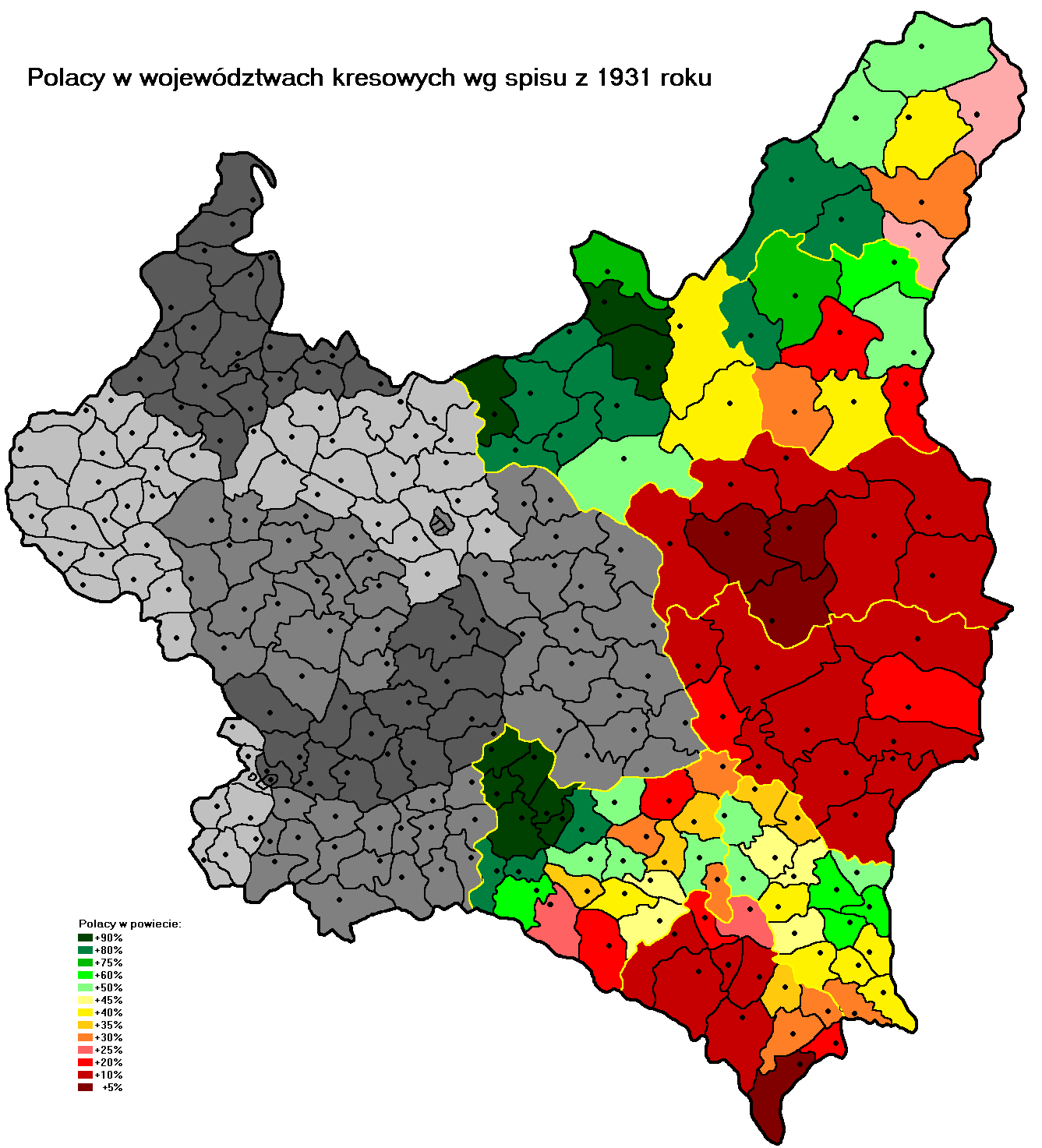
Percent of Poles in Kresy according to the 1931 census

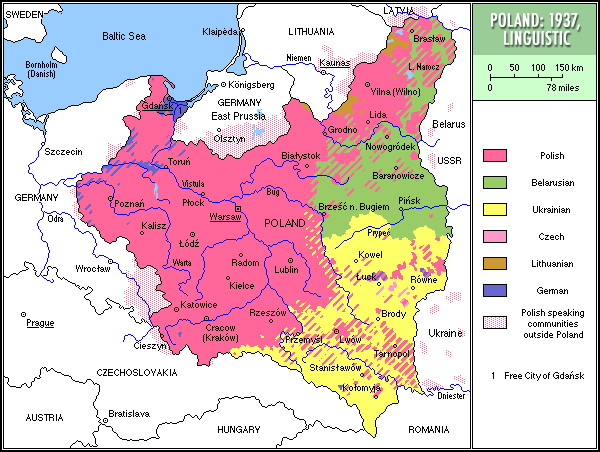

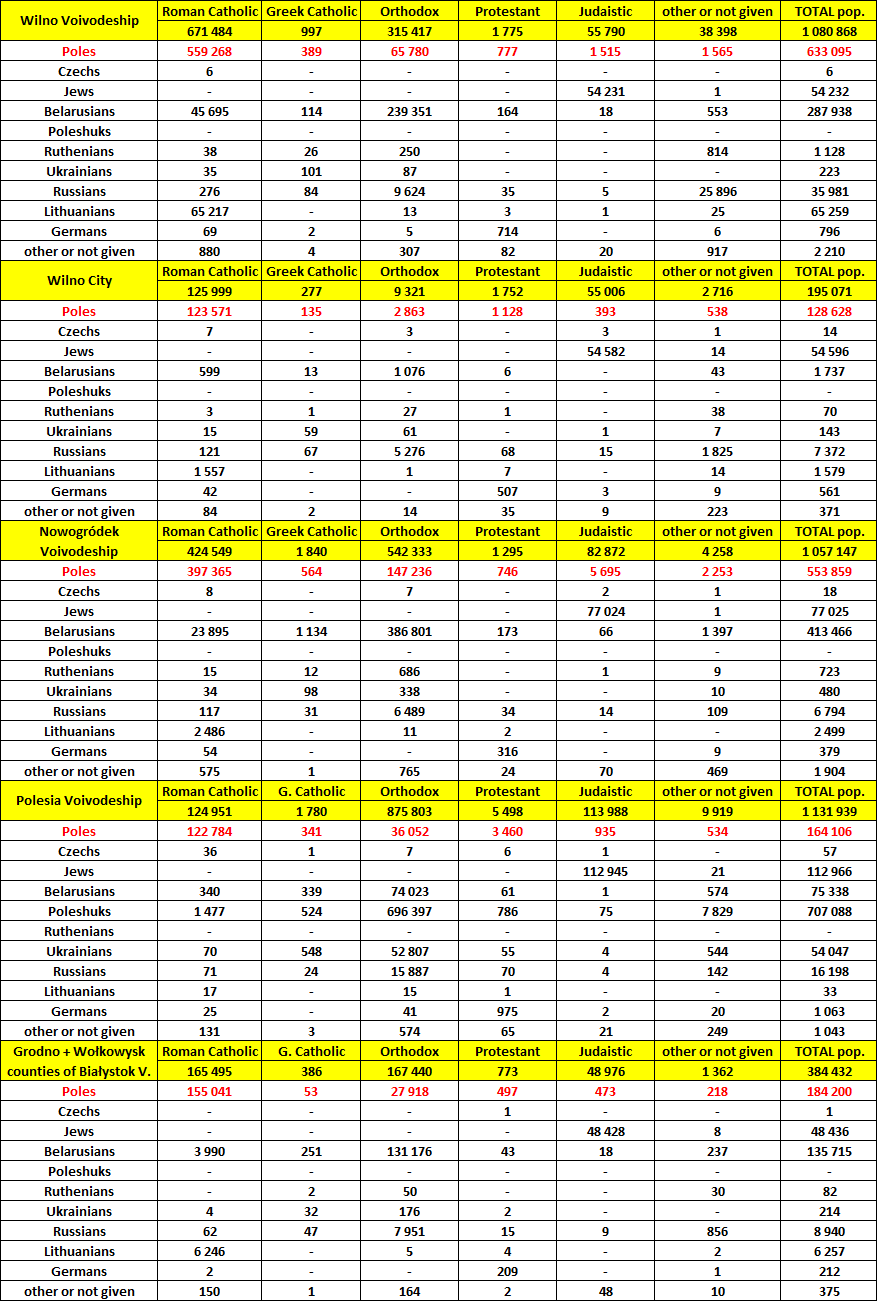
Linguistic (mother tongue) and religious structure of Northern Kresy (today parts of Belarus and Lithuania) according to the Polish census of 1931

The ethnic composition of these areas proved difficult to measure, both during the interwar period and after World War II. A 1944 article in The Times estimated that in 1931 between 2.2 and 2.5 million Poles lived east of the Curzon Line. According to historian Yohanan Cohen's estimate, in 1939 the population in the territories of interwar Poland east of the Curzon Line gained via the Treaty of Riga totalled 12 million, consisting of over 5 million Ukrainians, between 3.5 and 4 million Poles, 1.5 million Belarusians, and 1.3 million Jews. During World War II, politicians gave varying estimates of the Polish population east of the Curzon Line that would be affected by population transfers. Winston Churchill mentioned "3 to 4 million Poles east of the Curzon Line". Stanisław Mikołajczyk, then Prime Minister of the Polish government-in-exile, counted this population as 5 million.

Ukrainians and Belarusians if counted together composed the majority of the population of interwar Eastern Poland. The area also had a significant number of Jewish inhabitants. Poles constituted majorities in the main cities (followed by Jews) and in some rural areas, such as Vilnius region or Wilno Voivodeship.

After the Soviet deportation of Poles and Jews in 1939–1941 (see Polish minority in Soviet Union), The Holocaust and the ethnic cleansing of the Polish population of Volhynia and East Galicia by Ukrainian Nationalists, the Polish population in the territories had decreased considerably. The cities of Wilno, Lwów, Grodno and some smaller towns still had significant Polish populations. After 1945, the Polish population of the area east of the new Soviet-Polish border was in general confronted with the alternative either to accept a different citizenship or to emigrate. According to more recent research, about 3 million Roman Catholic Poles lived east of the Curzon Line within interwar Poland's borders, of whom about 2.1 million to 2.2 million died, fled, emigrated or were expelled to the newly annexed German territories. Large Polish minorities still exist in Lithuania and Belarus today. The cities of Vilnius, Grodno and some smaller towns still have significant Polish populations. Vilnius District Municipality and Sapotskin region have a Polish majority.

Ukrainian nationalists continued their partisan war and were imprisoned by the Soviets and sent to the Gulag. There they revolted, actively participating in several uprisings (Kengir uprising, Norilsk uprising, Vorkuta uprising).

Polish population east of the Curzon Line before World War II can be estimated by adding together figures for Former Eastern Poland and for pre-1939 Soviet Union:

1. Interwar Poland	Polish mother tongue (of whom Roman Catholics)	Source (census)	Today part of:
South-Eastern Poland	2,243,011 (1,765,765)	1931 Polish census	Ukraine
North-Eastern Poland	1,663,888 (1,358,029)	1931 Polish census	(Belarus) and (Lithuania)
2. Interwar USSR	Ethnic Poles according to official census	Source (census)	Today part of:
Soviet Ukraine	476,435	1926 Soviet census	Ukraine
Soviet Belarus	97,498	1926 Soviet census	Belarus
Soviet Russia	197,827	1926 Soviet census	Russia
rest of the USSR	10,574	1926 Soviet census	
3. Interwar Baltic states	Ethnic Poles according to official census	Source (census)	Today part of:
Lithuania	65,599 (Note: Polish sources estimated, based on the percentage of votes for Polish parties in the 1923 Lithuanian parliamentary election, that the real number of ethnic Poles in interwar Lithuania in 1923 was 202,026.)	1923 Lithuanian census	Lithuania
Latvia	59,374	1930 Latvian census	Latvia
Estonia	1,608	1934 Estonian census	Estonia
TOTAL (1., 2., 3.)	4 to 5 million ethnic Poles		

Two tables below show the linguistic (mother tongue) and religious structure of interwar South-Eastern Poland (nowadays part of Western Ukraine) and interwar North-Eastern Poland (nowadays part of Western Belarus and southern Lithuania) by county, according to the 1931 census.

South-East Poland:

Linguistic and religious structure of South-East Poland in 1931
County	Pop.	Polish	%	Yiddish & Hebrew	%	Ukrainian & Ruthenian	%	Other language (Note: Includes German and Czech, etc.)	%	Roman Catholic	%	Jewish	%	Uniate & Orthodox	%	Other religion (Note: Includes Protestants, Old Believers, etc.)	%
Dubno	226709	33987	15.0%	17430	7.7%	158173	69.8%	17119	7.6%	27638	12.2%	18227	8.0%	173512	76.5%	7332	3.2%
Horokhiv	122045	21100	17.3%	9993	8.2%	84224	69.0%	6728	5.5%	17675	14.5%	10112	8.3%	87333	71.6%	6925	5.7%
Kostopil	159602	34951	21.9%	10481	6.6%	105346	66.0%	8824	5.5%	34450	21.6%	10786	6.8%	103912	65.1%	10454	6.6%
Kovel	255095	36720	14.4%	26476	10.4%	185240	72.6%	6659	2.6%	35191	13.8%	26719	10.5%	187717	73.6%	5468	2.1%
Kremenets	243032	25758	10.6%	18679	7.7%	196000	80.6%	2595	1.1%	25082	10.3%	18751	7.7%	195233	80.3%	3966	1.6%
Liuboml	85507	12150	14.2%	6818	8.0%	65906	77.1%	633	0.7%	10998	12.9%	6861	8.0%	65685	76.8%	1963	2.3%
Lutsk	290805	56446	19.4%	34142	11.7%	172038	59.2%	28179	9.7%	55802	19.2%	34354	11.8%	177377	61.0%	23272	8.0%
Rivne	252787	36990	14.6%	37484	14.8%	160484	63.5%	17829	7.1%	36444	14.4%	37713	14.9%	166970	66.1%	11660	4.6%
Sarny	181284	30426	16.8%	16019	8.8%	129637	71.5%	5202	2.9%	28192	15.6%	16088	8.9%	132691	73.2%	4313	2.4%
Volodymyr	150374	40286	26.8%	17236	11.5%	88174	58.6%	4678	3.1%	38483	25.6%	17331	11.5%	89641	59.6%	4919	3.3%
Zdolbuniv	118334	17826	15.1%	10787	9.1%	81650	69.0%	8071	6.8%	17901	15.1%	10850	9.2%	86948	73.5%	2635	2.2%
Borshchiv	103277	46153	44.7%	4302	4.2%	52612	50.9%	210	0.2%	28432	27.5%	9353	9.1%	65344	63.3%	148	0.1%
Brody	91248	32843	36.0%	7640	8.4%	50490	55.3%	275	0.3%	22521	24.7%	10360	11.4%	58009	63.6%	358	0.4%
Berezhany	103824	48168	46.4%	3716	3.6%	51757	49.9%	183	0.2%	41962	40.4%	7151	6.9%	54611	52.6%	100	0.1%
Buchach	139062	60523	43.5%	8059	5.8%	70336	50.6%	144	0.1%	51311	36.9%	10568	7.6%	77023	55.4%	160	0.1%
Chortkiv	84008	36486	43.4%	6474	7.7%	40866	48.6%	182	0.2%	33080	39.4%	7845	9.3%	42828	51.0%	255	0.3%
Kamianka-Buzka	82111	41693	50.8%	4737	5.8%	35178	42.8%	503	0.6%	29828	36.3%	6700	8.2%	45113	54.9%	470	0.6%
Kopychyntsi	88614	38158	43.1%	5164	5.8%	45196	51.0%	96	0.1%	31202	35.2%	7291	8.2%	50007	56.4%	114	0.1%
Pidhaitsi	95663	46710	48.8%	3464	3.6%	45031	47.1%	458	0.5%	38003	39.7%	4786	5.0%	52634	55.0%	240	0.3%
Peremyshliany	89908	52269	58.1%	4445	4.9%	32777	36.5%	417	0.5%	38475	42.8%	6860	7.6%	44002	48.9%	571	0.6%
Radekhiv	69313	25427	36.7%	3277	4.7%	39970	57.7%	639	0.9%	17945	25.9%	6934	10.0%	42928	61.9%	1506	2.2%
Skalat	89215	60091	67.4%	3654	4.1%	25369	28.4%	101	0.1%	45631	51.1%	8486	9.5%	34798	39.0%	300	0.3%
Ternopil	142220	93874	66.0%	5836	4.1%	42374	29.8%	136	0.1%	63286	44.5%	17684	12.4%	60979	42.9%	271	0.2%
Terebovlia	84321	50178	59.5%	3173	3.8%	30868	36.6%	102	0.1%	38979	46.2%	4845	5.7%	40452	48.0%	45	0.1%
Zalishchyky	72021	27549	38.3%	3261	4.5%	41147	57.1%	64	0.1%	17917	24.9%	5965	8.3%	48069	66.7%	70	0.1%
Zbarazh	65579	32740	49.9%	3142	4.8%	29609	45.2%	88	0.1%	24855	37.9%	3997	6.1%	36468	55.6%	259	0.4%
Zboriv	81413	39624	48.7%	2522	3.1%	39174	48.1%	93	0.1%	26239	32.2%	5056	6.2%	49925	61.3%	193	0.2%
Zolochiv	118609	56628	47.7%	6066	5.1%	55381	46.7%	534	0.5%	36937	31.1%	10236	8.6%	70663	59.6%	773	0.7%
Dolyna	118373	21158	17.9%	9031	7.6%	83880	70.9%	4304	3.6%	15630	13.2%	10471	8.8%	89811	75.9%	2461	2.1%
Horodenka	92894	27751	29.9%	5031	5.4%	59957	64.5%	155	0.2%	15519	16.7%	7480	8.1%	69789	75.1%	106	0.1%
Kalush	102252	18637	18.2%	5109	5.0%	77506	75.8%	1000	1.0%	14418	14.1%	6249	6.1%	80750	79.0%	835	0.8%
Kolomyia	176000	52006	29.5%	11191	6.4%	110533	62.8%	2270	1.3%	31925	18.1%	20887	11.9%	121376	69.0%	1812	1.0%
Kosiv	93952	6718	7.2%	6730	7.2%	79838	85.0%	666	0.7%	4976	5.3%	7826	8.3%	80903	86.1%	247	0.3%
Nadvírna	140702	16907	12.0%	11020	7.8%	112128	79.7%	647	0.5%	15214	10.8%	11663	8.3%	113116	80.4%	709	0.5%
Rohatyn	127252	36152	28.4%	6111	4.8%	84875	66.7%	114	0.1%	27108	21.3%	9466	7.4%	90456	71.1%	222	0.2%
Stanyslaviv	198359	49032	24.7%	26996	13.6%	120214	60.6%	2117	1.1%	42519	21.4%	29525	14.9%	123959	62.5%	2356	1.2%
Stryi	152631	25186	16.5%	15413	10.1%	106183	69.6%	5849	3.8%	23404	15.3%	17115	11.2%	108159	70.9%	3953	2.6%
Sniatyn	78025	17206	22.1%	4341	5.6%	56007	71.8%	471	0.6%	8659	11.1%	7073	9.1%	61797	79.2%	496	0.6%
Tlumach	116028	44958	38.7%	3677	3.2%	66659	57.5%	734	0.6%	31478	27.1%	6702	5.8%	76650	66.1%	1198	1.0%
Zhydachiv	83817	16464	19.6%	4728	5.6%	61098	72.9%	1527	1.8%	15094	18.0%	5289	6.3%	63144	75.3%	290	0.3%
Bibrka	97124	30762	31.7%	5533	5.7%	60444	62.2%	385	0.4%	22820	23.5%	7972	8.2%	66113	68.1%	219	0.2%
Dobromyl	93970	35945	38.3%	4997	5.3%	52463	55.8%	565	0.6%	25941	27.6%	7522	8.0%	59664	63.5%	843	0.9%
Drohobych	194456	91935	47.3%	20484	10.5%	79214	40.7%	2823	1.5%	52172	26.8%	28888	14.9%	110850	57.0%	2546	1.3%
Horodok	85007	33228	39.1%	2975	3.5%	47812	56.2%	992	1.2%	22408	26.4%	4982	5.9%	56713	66.7%	904	1.1%
Yavoriv	86762	26938	31.0%	3044	3.5%	55868	64.4%	912	1.1%	18394	21.2%	5161	5.9%	62828	72.4%	379	0.4%
Lviv City	312231	198212	63.5%	75316	24.1%	35137	11.3%	3566	1.1%	157490	50.4%	99595	31.9%	50824	16.3%	4322	1.4%
Lviv County	142800	80712	56.5%	1569	1.1%	58395	40.9%	2124	1.5%	67430	47.2%	5087	3.6%	67592	47.3%	2691	1.9%
Mostyska	89460	49989	55.9%	2164	2.4%	37196	41.6%	111	0.1%	34619	38.7%	5428	6.1%	49230	55.0%	183	0.2%
Rava-Ruska	122072	27376	22.4%	10991	9.0%	82133	67.3%	1572	1.3%	22489	18.4%	13381	11.0%	84808	69.5%	1394	1.1%
Rudky	79170	38417	48.5%	4247	5.4%	36254	45.8%	252	0.3%	27674	35.0%	5396	6.8%	45756	57.8%	344	0.4%
Sambir	133814	56818	42.5%	7794	5.8%	68222	51.0%	980	0.7%	43583	32.6%	11258	8.4%	78527	58.7%	446	0.3%
Sokal	109111	42851	39.3%	5917	5.4%	59984	55.0%	359	0.3%	25425	23.3%	13372	12.3%	69963	64.1%	351	0.3%
Turka	114457	26083	22.8%	7552	6.6%	80483	70.3%	339	0.3%	6301	5.5%	10627	9.3%	97339	85.0%	190	0.2%
Zhovkva	95507	35816	37.5%	3344	3.5%	56060	58.7%	287	0.3%	20279	21.2%	7848	8.2%	66823	70.0%	557	0.6%
South-East Poland	6922206	2243011	32.4%	549782	7.9%	3983550	57.6%	145863	2.1%	1707428	24.7%	708172	10.2%	4387812	63.4%	118794	1.7%

North-East Poland:

Linguistic and religious structure of North-East Poland in 1931
County	Pop.	Polish	%	Yiddish & Hebrew	%	Belarusian, Poleshuk & Russian	%	Other language (Note: Includes Lithuanian and Ukrainian, etc.)	%	Roman Catholic	%	Jewish	%	Orthodox & Uniate	%	Other religion (Note: Includes Old Believers, Protestants, etc.)	%
Baranavichy	161038	74916	46.5%	15034	9.3%	70627	43.9%	461	0.3%	45126	28.0%	16074	10.0%	99118	61.5%	720	0.4%
Lida	183485	145609	79.4%	14546	7.9%	20538	11.2%	2792	1.5%	144627	78.8%	14913	8.1%	23025	12.5%	920	0.5%
Nyasvizh	114464	27933	24.4%	8754	7.6%	77094	67.4%	683	0.6%	22378	19.6%	8880	7.8%	82245	71.9%	961	0.8%
Novogrudok	149536	35084	23.5%	10326	6.9%	103783	69.4%	343	0.2%	28796	19.3%	10462	7.0%	109162	73.0%	1116	0.7%
Slonim	126510	52313	41.4%	10058	8.0%	63445	50.2%	694	0.5%	23817	18.8%	12344	9.8%	89724	70.9%	625	0.5%
Stowbtsy	99389	51820	52.1%	6341	6.4%	40875	41.1%	353	0.4%	37856	38.1%	6975	7.0%	54076	54.4%	482	0.5%
Shchuchyn	107203	89462	83.5%	6705	6.3%	10658	9.9%	378	0.4%	60097	56.1%	7883	7.4%	38900	36.3%	323	0.3%
Valozhyn	115522	76722	66.4%	5261	4.6%	33240	28.8%	299	0.3%	61852	53.5%	5341	4.6%	47923	41.5%	406	0.4%
Braslaw	143161	93958	65.6%	7181	5.0%	37689	26.3%	4333	3.0%	89020	62.2%	7703	5.4%	29713	20.8%	16725	11.7%
Dzisna	159886	62282	39.0%	11762	7.4%	85051	53.2%	791	0.5%	56895	35.6%	11948	7.5%	88118	55.1%	2925	1.8%
Molodechno	91285	35523	38.9%	5789	6.3%	49747	54.5%	226	0.2%	21704	23.8%	5910	6.5%	63074	69.1%	597	0.7%
Oshmyany	104612	84951	81.2%	6721	6.4%	11064	10.6%	1876	1.8%	81369	77.8%	7056	6.7%	15125	14.5%	1062	1.0%
Pastavy	99907	47917	48.0%	2683	2.7%	49071	49.1%	236	0.2%	50751	50.8%	2769	2.8%	44477	44.5%	1910	1.9%
Švenčionys	136475	68441	50.1%	7654	5.6%	16814	12.3%	43566	31.9%	117524	86.1%	7678	5.6%	1978	1.4%	9295	6.8%
Vilyeyka	131070	59477	45.4%	5934	4.5%	65220	49.8%	439	0.3%	53168	40.6%	6113	4.7%	70664	53.9%	1125	0.9%
Vilnius-Trakai	214472	180546	84.2%	6508	3.0%	9263	4.3%	18155	8.5%	201053	93.7%	6613	3.1%	2988	1.4%	3818	1.8%
Vilnius City	195071	128628	65.9%	54596	28.0%	9109	4.7%	2738	1.4%	125999	64.6%	55006	28.2%	9598	4.9%	4468	2.3%
Brest	215927	50248	23.3%	32089	14.9%	115323	53.4%	18267	8.5%	43020	19.9%	32280	14.9%	135911	62.9%	4716	2.2%
Drahichyn	97040	6844	7.1%	6947	7.2%	81557	84.0%	1692	1.7%	5699	5.9%	6981	7.2%	83147	85.7%	1213	1.3%
Kamin-Kashyrskyi	94988	6692	7.0%	4014	4.2%	75699	79.7%	8583	9.0%	6026	6.3%	4037	4.3%	83113	87.5%	1812	1.9%
Kobryn	113972	10040	8.8%	10489	9.2%	71435	62.7%	22008	19.3%	8973	7.9%	10527	9.2%	93426	82.0%	1046	0.9%
Kosava	83696	8456	10.1%	6300	7.5%	68769	82.2%	171	0.2%	7810	9.3%	6333	7.6%	68941	82.4%	612	0.7%
Luninyets	108663	16535	15.2%	7811	7.2%	83769	77.1%	548	0.5%	13754	12.7%	8072	7.4%	85728	78.9%	1109	1.0%
Pinsk	184305	29077	15.8%	25088	13.6%	128787	69.9%	1353	0.7%	16465	8.9%	25385	13.8%	140022	76.0%	2433	1.3%
Pruzhany	108583	17762	16.4%	9419	8.7%	81032	74.6%	370	0.3%	16311	15.0%	9463	8.7%	82015	75.5%	794	0.7%
Stolin	124765	18452	14.8%	10809	8.7%	92253	73.9%	3251	2.6%	6893	5.5%	10910	8.7%	105280	84.4%	1682	1.3%
Grodno	213105	101089	47.4%	35354	16.6%	69832	32.8%	6830	3.2%	89122	41.8%	35693	16.7%	87205	40.9%	1085	0.5%
Volkovysk	171327	83111	48.5%	13082	7.6%	74823	43.7%	311	0.2%	76373	44.6%	13283	7.8%	80621	47.1%	1050	0.6%
North-East Poland	3849457	1663888	43.2%	347255	9.0%	1696567	44.1%	141747	3.7%	1512478	39.3%	356632	9.3%	1915317	49.7%	65030	1.7%

=== Largest cities and towns ===
In 1931, according to the Polish National Census, the ten largest cities in Polish Eastern Borderlands were: Lwów (pop. 312,200), Wilno (pop. 195,100), Stanisławów (pop. 60,000), Grodno (pop. 49,700), Brześć nad Bugiem (pop. 48,400), Borysław (pop. 41,500), Równe (pop. 40,600), Tarnopol (pop. 35,600), Łuck (pop. 35,600) and Kołomyja (pop. 33,800).

In addition, Daugavpils (pop. 43,200 in 1930) in inter-war Latvia was also a major Polish community with 21% ethnic Polish inhabitants.

Ethnolinguistic structure (mother tongue) of the population in 24 largest cities and towns in Kresy according to the censuses of 1931 and 1930
City	Pop.	Polish	Yiddish & Hebrew	German	Ukrainian & Ruthenian	Belarusian	Russian	Lithuanian	Other	Today part of:
Lwów	312,231	63.5% (198,212)	24.1% (75,316)	0.8% (2,448)	11.3% (35,137)	0% (24)	0.1% (462)	0% (6)	0.2% (626)	Ukraine
Wilno	195,071	65.9% (128,628)	28% (54,596)	0.3% (561)	0.1% (213)	0.9% (1,737)	3.8% (7,372)	0.8% (1,579)	0.2% (385)	Lithuania
Stanisławów	59,960	43.7% (26,187)	38.3% (22,944)	2.2% (1,332)	15.6% (9,357)	0% (3)	0.1% (50)	0% (1)	0.1% (86)	Ukraine
Grodno	49,669	47.2% (23,458)	42.1% (20,931)	0.2% (99)	0.2% (83)	2.5% (1,261)	7.5% (3,730)	0% (22)	0.2% (85)	Belarus
Brześć	48,385	42.6% (20,595)	44.1% (21,315)	0% (24)	0.8% (393)	7.1% (3,434)	5.3% (2,575)	0% (1)	0.1% (48)	Belarus
Daugavpils	43,226	20.8% (9,007)	26.9% (11,636)	-	-	2.3% (1,006)	19.5% (8,425)	-	30.4% (13,152)	Latvia
Borysław	41,496	55.3% (22,967)	25.4% (10,538)	0.5% (209)	18.5% (7,686)	0% (4)	0.1% (37)	0% (2)	0.1% (53)	Ukraine
Równe	40,612	27.5% (11,173)	55.5% (22,557)	0.8% (327)	7.9% (3,194)	0.1% (58)	6.9% (2,792)	0% (4)	1.2% (507)	Ukraine
Tarnopol	35,644	77.7% (27,712)	14% (5,002)	0% (14)	8.1% (2,896)	0% (2)	0% (6)	0% (0)	0% (12)	Ukraine
Łuck	35,554	31.9% (11,326)	48.6% (17,267)	2.3% (813)	9.3% (3,305)	0.1% (36)	6.4% (2,284)	0% (1)	1.5% (522)	Ukraine
Kołomyja	33,788	65% (21,969)	20.1% (6,798)	3.6% (1,220)	11.1% (3,742)	0% (0)	0% (6)	0% (2)	0.2% (51)	Ukraine
Drohobycz	32,261	58.4% (18,840)	24.8% (7,987)	0.4% (120)	16.3% (5,243)	0% (13)	0.1% (21)	0% (0)	0.1% (37)	Ukraine
Pińsk	31,912	23% (7,346)	63.2% (20,181)	0.1% (45)	0.3% (82)	4.3% (1,373)	9% (2,866)	0% (2)	0.1% (17)	Belarus
Stryj	30,491	42.3% (12,897)	31.4% (9,561)	1.6% (501)	24.6% (7,510)	0% (0)	0% (10)	0% (0)	0% (12)	Ukraine
Kowel	27,677	37.2% (10,295)	46.2% (12,786)	0.2% (50)	9% (2,489)	0.1% (27)	7.1% (1,954)	0% (1)	0.3% (75)	Ukraine
Włodzimierz	24,591	39.1% (9,616)	43.1% (10,611)	0.6% (138)	14% (3,446)	0.1% (18)	2.9% (724)	0% (0)	0.2% (38)	Ukraine
Baranowicze	22,818	42.8% (9,758)	41.3% (9,423)	0.1% (25)	0.2% (50)	11.1% (2,537)	4.4% (1,006)	0% (1)	0.1% (18)	Belarus
Sambor	21,923	61.9% (13,575)	24.3% (5,325)	0.1% (28)	13.2% (2,902)	0% (4)	0% (4)	0% (0)	0.4% (85)	Ukraine
Krzemieniec	19,877	15.6% (3,108)	36.4% (7,245)	0.1% (23)	42.4% (8,430)	0% (6)	4.4% (883)	0% (2)	0.9% (180)	Ukraine
Lida	19,326	63.3% (12,239)	32.6% (6,300)	0% (5)	0.1% (28)	2.1% (414)	1.7% (328)	0% (2)	0.1% (10)	Belarus
Czortków	19,038	55.2% (10,504)	25.5% (4,860)	0.1% (11)	19.1% (3,633)	0% (0)	0.1% (17)	0% (0)	0.1% (13)	Ukraine
Brody	17,905	44.9% (8,031)	35% (6,266)	0.2% (37)	19.8% (3,548)	0% (5)	0.1% (9)	0% (0)	0.1% (9)	Ukraine
Słonim	16,251	52% (8,452)	41.1% (6,683)	0.1% (9)	0.3% (45)	4% (656)	2.3% (369)	0% (2)	0.2% (35)	Belarus
Wołkowysk	15,027	49.6% (7,448)	38.8% (5,827)	0% (7)	0.1% (10)	6.9% (1,038)	4.6% (689)	0% (3)	0% (5)	Belarus

== Poles east of the Curzon Line after expulsion ==
Despite the expulsion of most ethnic Poles from the Soviet Union between 1944 and 1958, the Soviet census of 1959 still counted around 1.4 million ethnic Poles remaining in the USSR:

Republic of the USSR	Ethnic Poles in 1959 census
Byelorussian SSR	538,881
Ukrainian SSR	363,297
Lithuanian SSR	230,107
Latvian SSR	59,774
Estonian SSR	2,256
rest of the USSR	185,967
TOTAL	1,380,282

According to a more recent census, there were about 295,000 Poles in Belarus in 2009 (3.1% of the Belarus population).

== Ethnicity west of the Curzon Line until 1939 ==
According to Piotr Eberhardt, in 1939, the population of all territories between the Oder-Neisse Line and the Curzon Line—all territories which formed post-1945 Poland—totalled 32,337,800 inhabitants, of whom the largest groups were ethnic Poles (approximately 67%), ethnic Germans (approximately 25%), and Jews (2,254,300 or 7%), with 657,500 (2%) Ukrainians, 140,900 Belarusians and 47,000 people of all other ethnic groups also in the region. Much of the Ukrainian population was forcibly resettled after World War II to Soviet Ukraine or scattered in the new Polish Recovered Territories of Silesia, Pomerania, Lubusz Land, Warmia and Masuria in an ethnic cleansing by the Polish military in an operation called Operation Vistula.

== See also ==
- 1893 Afghanistan’s Durand Line
- 1914 India–China McMahon Line
- 1947 India–Pakistan Radcliffe Line
- I Saw Poland Betrayed by Arthur Bliss Lane
- Lewis Bernstein Namier
- Molotov Line
- Oder–Neisse line
- Spa Conference of 1920
- Territorial changes of Poland immediately after World War II
- Zakerzonia

== Sources ==
- Borsody, Stephen. 1993. The New Central Europe. Chapter 10: "Europe's Coming Partition". New York: Boulder. ISBN 0-88033-263-8.
- Byrnes, James F. Speaking Frankly. New York: Harper and Brothers Publishers, 1947, pp. 25–32. From the memoirs of James F. Byrnes, on the Yalta Conference.
- Churchill, Winston S. Closing the Ring. 2nd ed. The Second World War Volume 5. London: The Reprint Society Ltd, 1954, pp. 283–285; 314-317. From the memoirs of Winston Churchill.
- Churchill, Winston S. Triumph and Tragedy. 2nd ed. The Second World War Volume 6. London: The Reprint Society Ltd, 1956, pp. 288–292. From the memoirs of Winston Churchill, on the Yalta Conference.
- Crimea Conference, in Parliamentary Debates. 1944–45, No. 408; fifth series, pp. 1274–1284. Winston Churchill's statement to the House of Commons of the United Kingdom, 27 February 1945, describing the outcome of the Yalta Conference.
- Nabrdalik, Bart. April 2006. "Hidden Europe-Bieszczady, Poland". Escape from America Magazine. Vol. 8, Issue 3.
- Rogowska, Anna. Stępień, Stanisław. "Polish-Ukrainian Border in the Last Half of the Century" (in Polish). (The Curzon Line from the historical perspective.)
- Wróbel, Piotr. 2000. "The devil's playground: Poland in World War II". The Wanda Muszynski lecture in Polish studies. Montreal, Quebec: Canadian Foundation for Polish Studies of the Polish Institute of Arts & Sciences.
