= Dmowski's Line =

Proposed borders for Poland after World War I

Polish territorial demands at the Paris Peace Conference 1919 (Dmowski's Line) on ethnographical background and borders of Polish–Lithuanian Commonwealth 1772

Dmowski's Line (Polish: Linia Dmowskiego) was a proposed border of Poland after World War I. It was proposed by the Polish delegation at the Paris Peace Conference of 1919 and it was named after Roman Dmowski, Polish foreign minister. Poland wanted Upper Silesia, Pomerelia including Danzig, Warmia and Masuria, and western parts of Belarus, Polesia, Volhynia and Podolia.

== Concept of the Dmowski's Line ==
Dmowski tried to enclose within the borders of the proposed state all the major centers of Polish culture, and at the same time to repair the consequences of the neglect of the policy of the former Poland, lacking stable access to the sea and key resources. His starting point was the geographical distribution of the Polish population, associated with economic and political criteria. The latter also referred to the system of the future state. Although Dmowski did not comment on this matter, there is no doubt that he planned for it a Western-type system, based on the principle of allowing the population to choose the authorities. This is indicated both by the general logic of the proposal, based on the assumption that Poland would be a political ally of the West, and by the desire to ensure at least a 60% Polish majority in the proposed state.

The characteristic of this concept, and in the opinion of its critics its fundamental defect, was the lack of offers to nationalities other than Polish living in the area of former Poland. Dmowski accepted the risks of such a stance, although he was not free from doubts that it was not excessive in the Ukrainian-speaking area. This is what he wrote in a letter to Joachim Bartoszewicz in mid-July 1917:

“In order to be strong externally it is necessary, for us to go far enough to the east, but for the sake of internal strength it is not possible to go too far, because we will lose the Polish character of the state. In this regard, the northeast (Lithuania, Belarus) is safer for us than the southeast (Ukraine). In my opinion, it would be best for us to have the governorates of Kaunas, Vilnius, Grodno, most of Minsk and Volhynia, and finally two counties of Podolia (Ploskirovsk and Kamenets). But will the outgrowth of the Ukrainian question allow us to have such counties? I would like to know what you think about all this. There are a lot of people with you who would like to arrange Poland from the point of view of the geographical location of their personal estates. I don't take it against them - it is quite natural. But it is our duty to strive to create a Poland that can exist, be strong and secure from outside intrigues.”

== Boundary line ==
The boundary line to the east was Polish by the notes from the Polish Delegation as follows:

... ranging from the Baltic coast east of Łabiawy boundary line follows the coast to the north of Klaipėda and Palanga. ... From the coast to the north of Libawa proceed to the east boundary line of the historic border between the Poland 1772, and Courland. It comes in this way to the Iłłukszta county in Courland. This county is recovered by Poland due to its geographical position and the advantage of the Polish element in the population. From here, border proceeds along the limit of Iłłukszta county to Daugava river and passes on its right bank (Vitebsk Governorate) in order to proceed eastward parallel to the river, and approximately 30 kilometers to the borders of the Dryświaty county, including same, along with the Polock county. Next it passes the north-west from Horodka, returns to the left bank of the Daugava River about 30 miles west of Vitebsk and goes toward the south, passing west of the Sienna to the point where it meets the boundary between Minsk and Mohylow Gouvernement, proceeding from the boundary line towards the south until the Berezina in place where it touches the northern border of the Rzeczyca county, then crossing the Berezina, goes in a southwesterly direction to the marshes to the east of Mazyr. From there, crossing Pripyat, the boundary follows the dividing line between the Rzeczyca and Mazyr counties, then, is still proceeding in a south west, passes to the west to the cities of Zwiahel and Ovruch in Volhynia and arrives at the point where the borders of Zaslaw, Ostrog and Zwiahel counties meet. Then, heading south, the frontier line is progressing along the eastern border of Zaslaw and Starokonstantynów counties, to the point where it meets boundaries of Latyczów and Ploskirów counties in Podolia, there is still in a southerly direction until it reaches the river Uszyca near Zińków and goes along its course to the Dniester, which is at this point the southern border between Poland and Romania.

== Józef Piłsudski on Dmowski's Line ==
Despite the political tensions between the camps of Roman Dmowski and Józef Piłsudski, there was a far-reaching convergence of positions on the general outline of the state's borders. The instructions prepared by the Chief of State for the representatives sent to Paris largely coincided with the minimum program of Dmowski's Polish National Committee.

Piłsudski himself allowed for the possibility of accepting Dmowski's incorporation concept, saying:

In principle, Dmowski's line can be accepted if no other possibilities emerge.

— Józef Piłsudski

The differences between the two concepts concerned primarily the methods of action and the vision of the future political order in Central and Eastern Europe, rather than the scope of territorial aspirations.

Consequently, in the Treaty of Riga the Polish-Soviet border was demarcated in the distance of about 30 km to the west and north of Minsk. Polish territory according to Dmowski's proposal was supposed to be equal to 447,000 km^{2}.

== See also ==
- Intermarium, in Polish, Międzymorze
- Curzon Line
- Foch Line
