= Krzysztof Kawalec =

Polish historian, lecturer and professor

Krzysztof Maria Kawalec (born 27 April 1954 in Wrocław) is a Polish historian, lecturer and professor at the University of Wrocław. He specializes in the history of Polish political thought of 19th and 20th centuries, Second Polish Republic and right-wing National Democracy political camp.

Kawalec graduated from Juliusz Słowacki Grammar School in Wrocław in 1973 and later entered studies at the University of Wrocław, where he studied e.g. under prof. Henryk Zieliński. Since 1978 he works as academician at the Institute of History of University of Wrocław. Since the creation of Solidarity trade union at his university in 1980 he was a member of this organization.

He received his doctoral degree in September 1996 and a professor degree in 2001. His book Spadkobiercy niepokornych: Dzieje polskiej myśli politycznej 1918-1939 (Heirs of Unyielding: History of Polish Political Thought 1918-1939), published in 2000, won the KLIO Prize (Nagroda KLIO) in 2000 for the best scientific monography.

== Works ==
- Narodowa Demokracja wobec faszyzmu 1922-1939: Ze studiów nad dziejami myśli politycznej obozu narodowego (1989)
- Wizje ustroju państwa w polskiej myśli politycznej lat 1918-1939: Ze studiów nad dziejami polskiej myśli politycznej (1995)
- Roman Dmowski (1996)
- Roman Dmowski o ustroju politycznym państwa (Roman Dmowski on the Political System of the State) (1996)
- Spadkobiercy niepokornych: Dzieje polskiej myśli politycznej 1918-1939 (Heirs of Unyielding: History of Polish Political Thought 1918-1939) (2000)
- Roman Dmowski 1864-1939 (2002, 2005)
