= Polish National Committee (1914–1917) =

Polish National Committee (Polish: Komitet Narodowy Polski) was formed in Russian partition during World War I, and grouped Polish politicians who wanted to advance the Polish cause by supporting Russia in World War I. The Committee was recognized by the Entente, and was primarily opposed to Polish factions supporting the Central Powers (in particular, Józef Piłsudski).

The Committee supported the creation of Blue Army under Józef Haller de Hallenburg in France.

Major activists: Roman Dmowski, Zygmunt Wielopolski.

In 1917, after the Russian Revolution, the Committee was reorganized in France. See Polish National Committee (1917–19).

== See also ==
- Ignacy Paderewski
