= Roman Dmowski =

Polish politician (1864–1939)

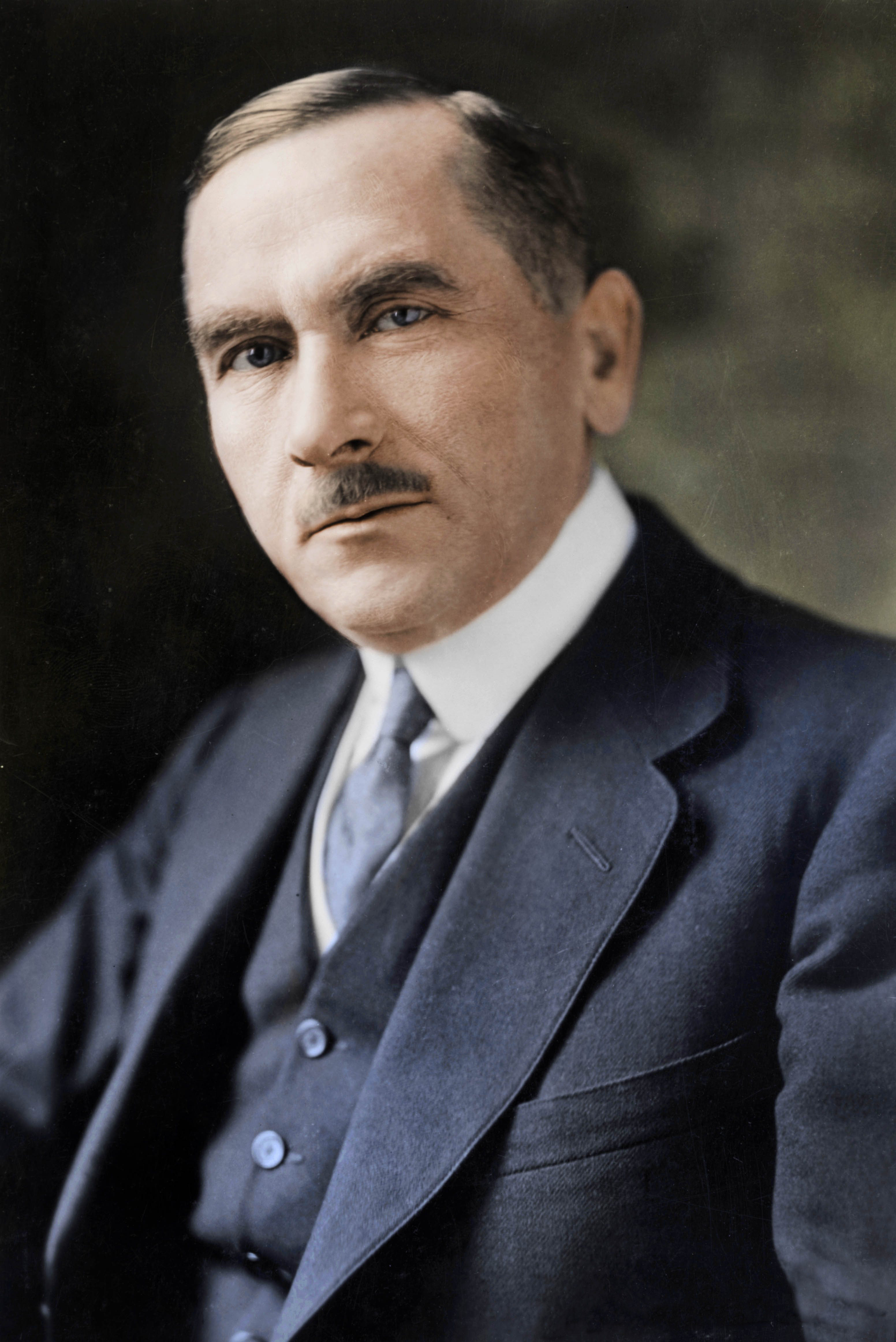
- Dmowski in 1919

Minister of Foreign Affairs
- In office 27 October 1923 – 14 December 1923
- President: Stanisław Wojciechowski
- Prime Minister: Wincenty Witos
- Preceded by: Marian Seyda
- Succeeded by: Karol Bertoni (acting)

Member of the Council of National Defense
- In office 1 July 1920 – 19 July 1920
- Prime Minister: Władysław Grabski
- Leader: Józef Piłsudski
- Succeeded by: Aleksander Skarbek

Member of the Sejm
- In office 10 February 1919 – 27 November 1922

President of the Polish National Committee
- In office 15 August 1917 – 15 April 1919

Member of the State Duma of the Russian Empire
- In office 20 February 1907 – 5 February 1909
- Succeeded by: Jan Harusewicz

Personal details
- Born: Roman Stanisław Dmowski; 9 August 1864 Kamionek, Congress Poland
- Died: 2 January 1939 (aged 74) Drozdowo, Poland
- Resting place: Bródno Cemetery, Warsaw
- Party: National-Democratic Party (1897–1919); Camp of Great Poland (1926-1933); National Party (from 1928)
- Education: University of Warsaw
- Profession: Politician; ideologue; writer

Roman Stanisław Dmowski (Polish: [ˈrɔman staˈɲiswaf ˈdmɔfski]; 9 August 1864 – 2 January 1939) was a Polish politician, statesman, and co-founder and chief ideologue of the National Democracy (abbreviated "ND": in Polish, "Endecja") political movement active during the interwar period.

While he never wielded significant political power except for a brief period in 1923 as Minister of Foreign Affairs, Dmowski was one of the most influential Polish ideologues and politicians of his time. A controversial personality most of his life, Dmowski desired a homogeneous, Polish-speaking and Roman Catholic-practicing nation. Throughout most of his life, he was the chief ideological opponent of the Polish military and political leader Józef Piłsudski and of the latter's vision of Prometheism, a multi-ethnic Poland reminiscent of the Polish–Lithuanian Commonwealth.

As a result, Dmowski's nationalist rhetoric actively marginalized other ethnic groups living in Poland, particularly those in the Kresy (which included Jews, Lithuanians, and Ukrainians). During the partitions, Dmowski saw the Germanization of Polish territories controlled by the German Empire as the major threat to Polish culture and therefore advocated a degree of accommodation with another power that had partitioned Poland, the Russian Empire. Openly antisemitic throughout his career, Dmowski believed that Poland's Jews were working hand in hand with the Germans to partition Poland and supported economic boycotts and property confiscation against both ethnic groups.

He favored the re-establishment of Polish independence by nonviolent means and supported policies favorable to the Polish middle class. While in Paris during World War I, he was a prominent spokesman for Polish aspirations to the Allies through his Polish National Committee. He was an instrumental figure in the postwar restoration of Poland's independent existence. Dmowski remains a highly polarizing figure. While often denounced as an antisemite, xenophobe, and an admirer of fascism, Dmowski has been highly influential in the history of Polish nationalist movements, and has been frequently referred to as "the father of Polish nationalism".

== Early life ==
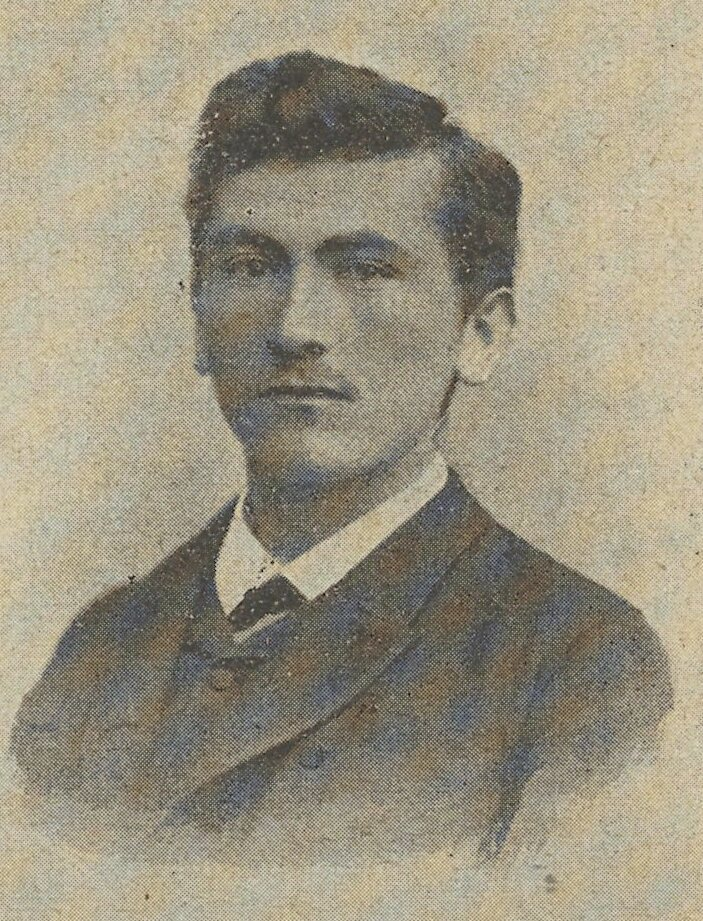
Dmowski in his youth

Dmowski was born on 9 August 1864 in Kamionek near Warsaw, in the Kingdom of Poland, which three years later became part of the Russian Empire (as Vistula Land). His father was a road construction worker and later an entrepreneur. Dmowski attended schools in Warsaw, studying biology and zoology at Warsaw University, from which he graduated in 1891. As a student he became active in the Polish Youth Association "Zet" (Związek Młodzieży Polskiej "Zet"), where he was active in opposing socialist activists. The Zet had links with the Liga Polska (Polish League), which Dmowski joined in 1889. A key concept of the League was Polskość (Polishness), as opposed to trójlojalizm (triple loyalty).

He also organized a student street demonstration on the 100th anniversary of the Polish Constitution of 3 May 1791. For this he was imprisoned by Russian Imperial authorities for five months in the Warsaw Citadel. He was then exiled to Libau and Mitau in Kurland (Latvia). After 1890 he was also developing as a writer and publicist, publishing political and literary criticism in Głos, where he became close friends with Jan Ludwik Popławski, who would be his mentor. After his release from exile, Dmowski became quite critical of the Liga Polska, accusing it of being controlled by Free Masons and being generally incompetent.

In April 1893, Dmowski co-founded the National League and became its first leader. The group differed from the Liga Polska as Dmowski insisted that there could be one Polish national identity, leading him to attack regionalism as a form of split loyalty that was weakening the Polish nation. The same concept also excluded minorities such as Jews from his projected Polish nation. In November 1893 he was sentenced to exile from the Vistula Land. Dmowski went to Jelgava, and soon afterward in early 1895 to Lemberg, Austria-Hungary (modern Lviv, Ukraine, Lwów in Polish), where together with Popławski he began to publish a new magazine, Przegląd Wszechpolski (All-Polish Review). In 1897, he co-founded the National-Democratic Party (Stronnictwo Narodowo-Demokratyczne or "Endecja"). The Endecja was to serve as a political party, a lobby group and an underground organization that would unite Poles who espoused Dmowski's views into a disciplined and committed political group. In 1899, Dmowski founded the Society for National Education as an ancillary group. From 1898 to 1900, he resided in France and Britain, and travelled to Brazil. In 1901 he took up residence in Kraków, then part of the Austrian partition of Poland. In 1903 he published a book, Myśli nowoczesnego Polaka (Thoughts of a Modern Pole), one of the first if not the first nationalist manifesto in European history.

In Myśli nowoczesnego Polaka, Dmowski was harshly critical of the old Polish–Lithuanian Commonwealth for exalting the nobility and for its tolerance for minorities, which contradicted his principle of "healthy" national egoism. He also rejected liberalism and socialism for putting the individual above the nation-state, which for Dmowski was the only unit that really mattered. Dmowski argued that the privileged status of the aristocracy in the old Commonwealth had hindered national development, and what was needed was a strong sense of nationality that would unite the nation into one. He also attacked the Romantic nationalism of the 19th century for viewing Poland as the "Christ of Nations", instead arguing for a hard-headed national egoism. Dmowski opposed revolutionary means of fighting, preferring political struggle, and aimed for independence through increased autonomy. After the outbreak of the Russo-Japanese War, Dmowski met with Colonel Akashi Motojiro, the Japanese military attache in Sweden and spy-master for Japanese intelligence activities, in Kraków in March 1904. Although reluctant to collaborate with the Japanese, Dmowski agreed to Akashi's proposal that Polish soldiers in the Russian Army in Manchuria might be encouraged to defect to the Imperial Japanese Army. He travelled to Tokyo to work out the details, and at the same time made a successful effort to prevent the Japanese from aiding a rival Polish political activist, Józef Piłsudski, who wanted assistance for a planned insurrection in Poland, an aspiration which Dmowski felt would be doomed to failure.

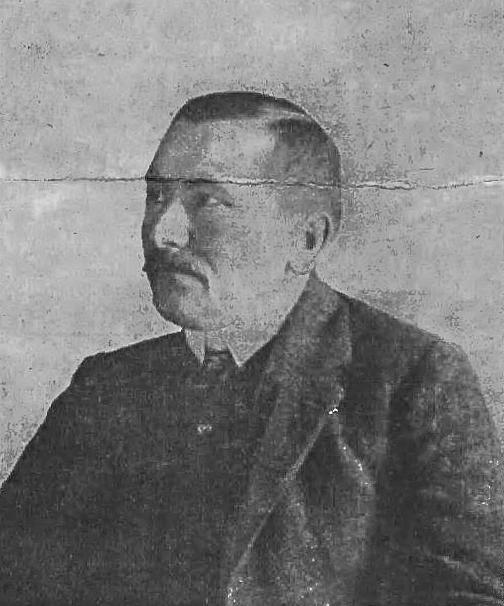
Dmowski, 1907

In 1905, Dmowski moved to Warsaw, back in the Russian partition of Poland, where he continued to play a growing role in the Endecja faction. During the Russian Revolution of 1905, Dmowski favoured co-operation with the Imperial Russian authorities and welcomed Nicholas II's October Manifesto of 1905 as a stepping stone on the road towards renewed Polish autonomy. During the revolt in Łódź in June 1905, the Endeks, acting under Dmowski's orders, opposed the uprising led by Piłsudski's Polish Socialist Party (PPS). During the course of the June Days, as the Łódź uprising is known, a miniature civil war raged between Endecja and the PPS. As a result of the elections to the First Duma (legislative assembly in the late Russian Empire), which were boycotted by the PPS, the National Democrats won 34 of the 55 seats allotted to Poland. Dmowski and the Endecja saw the Duma as a way of improving Congress Poland's position within the Russian Empire as he considered guerrilla war to be impractical. Dmowski himself was elected a deputy to the Second and Third Dumas (beginning on 27 February 1907) and was president of the Polish caucus within it. He was seen as a conservative, and despite being a Polish caucus leader, he often had more influence on the Russian than the Polish deputies. Between October 1905 and early 1906, over 2000 Poles were killed by Russian police or military and an additional 1000 were sentenced to death. Even though Dmowski was often denounced as a sellout, he maintained that he was undertaking the only realistic course of action for Poland under the circumstances.

Over time, Dmowski became more receptive to Russian overtures, particularly neoslavism, warming up to the idea that Poland and Russia may have a common future, particularly due to Germany being their common enemy. In light of what he regarded as Russian cultural inferiority, Dmowski felt that a strong Russia was more acceptable than a strong Germany. In Dmowski's view, the Russian policy of Russification would not succeed in subjugating the Poles, while the Germans would be far more successful with their Germanisation policies. He explained those views in his book Niemcy, Rosja i kwestia Polska (Germany, Russia and the Polish Cause), published in 1908. This was not a universally popular attitude, and in 1909 Dmowski resigned his deputy mandate to focus on an internal political struggle within Endecja. He lost the election to the Fourth Duma in 1912 to a socialist politician, Eugeniusz Jagiełło from the Polish Socialist Party – Left, who won with the support of the Jewish vote. Dmowski viewed this as a personal insult; in exchange, he organized a successful boycott of Jewish businesses throughout much of Poland.

== World War I ==
In 1914, Dmowski praised the Grand Duke Nicholas's Manifesto to the Polish Nation of 14 August, which vaguely assured the Tsar's Polish subjects that there would be greater autonomy for "Congress Poland" after the war and that the Austrian provinces of East and West Galicia, together with the Pomerania province of Prussia, would be annexed to the Kingdom of Poland when the German Empire and Austria-Hungary were defeated. However, subsequent attempts on the part of Dmowski to have the Russians make firmer commitments along the lines of the Grand Duke Nicholas's manifesto were met with elusive answers. Nonetheless, Dmowski's pro-Russian and anti-German propaganda succeeded in frustrating Piłsudski's plans of causing an anti-Russian uprising, and bolstered his position as an important Polish political figure on the international scene, especially with the Triple Entente. In November he became one of the active members of the Polish National Committee.

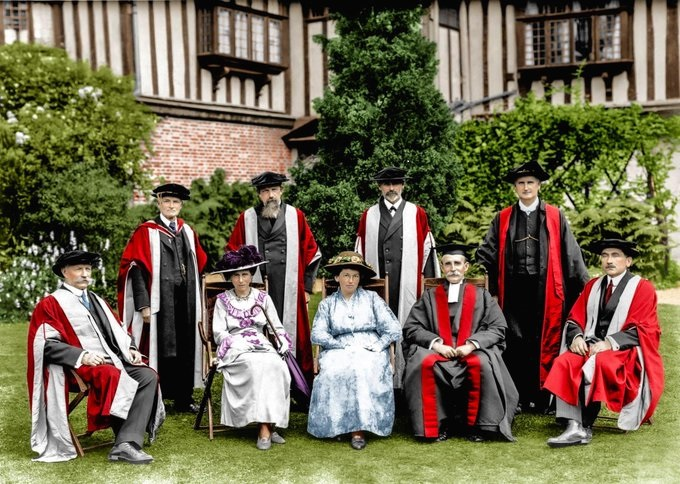
Award of Honorary Doctorate to Roman Dmowski - Cambridge University - 11 August 1916

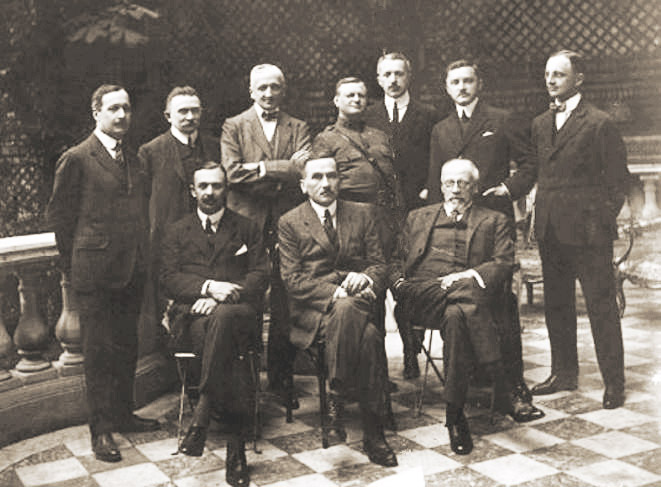
Dmowski with Polish National Committee members in Paris, 1918

In 1915, Dmowski, increasingly convinced of Russia's impending defeat, decided that to support the cause of Polish independence he should go abroad to campaign on behalf of Poland in the capitals of the western Allies. During his lobbying efforts, his friends included such opinion makers as the British journalist Wickham Steed. In particular, Dmowski was very successful in France, where he made a very favourable impression on public opinion. He gave a series of lectures at Cambridge University, which impressed the local faculty enough that he was given an honorary doctorate. In August 1917, in Paris, he created a new Polish National Committee aimed at rebuilding a Polish state. That year he also published, at his own expense, Problems of Central and Eastern Europe, that he soon distributed among numerous English speaking diplomats. He was a vocal critic of Austro-Hungary, and campaigned for the creation of a number of Slavic states (including for the Czechs, as well as non-Slavic Hungarians and Romanians) in its place. Within the Polish political community, he opposed those who supported allying themselves with Germany and Austria-Hungary, including supporters of a vague German proposal for a Regency Kingdom of Poland, with undefined borders, that Germany promised to create after World War I (while in secret, actually planning to strip it of up to 30,000 square kilometres for German colonization after the removal of its Polish population).

In 1917, Dmowski laid out a plan for the borders of a re-created Polish state; it would include Greater Poland, Pomerania with Gdańsk, Upper Silesia, south strip of East Prussia and Cieszyn Silesia. In September that year, Dmowski's National Committee was recognized by the French as the legitimate government of Poland. The British and the Americans were less enthusiastic about Dmowski's National Committee, but likewise recognized it as Poland's government a year later. However, the Americans refused to provide backing for what they regarded as Dmowski's excessive territorial claims (Dmowski's Line). The American President Woodrow Wilson reported, "I saw Mr. Dmowski and Mr. Paderewski in Washington, and I asked them to define Poland for me, as they understood it, and they presented me with a map in which they claimed a large part of the earth."

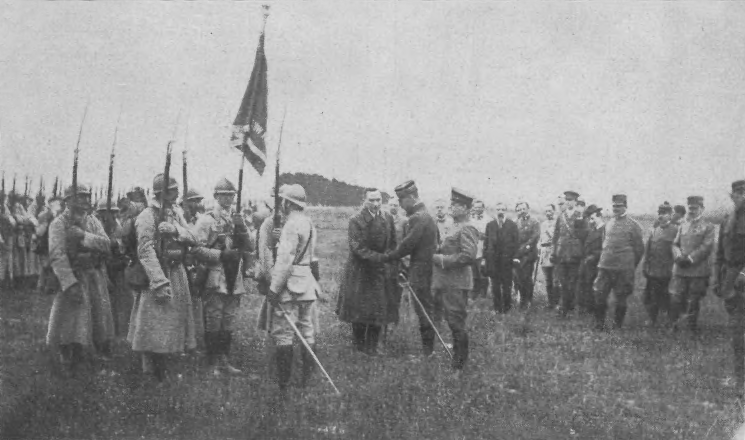
Dmowski among the soldiers of the Blue Army

In part, Wilson's objections stemmed from the dislike of Dmowski personally. One British diplomat stated, "He was a clever man, and clever men are distrusted; he was logical in his political theories and we hate logic; and he was persistent with a tenacity which was calculated to drive everybody mad." Another area of objection to Dmowski was with his antisemitic remarks, as in a speech he delivered at a dinner organized by the writer Gilbert Keith Chesterton, that began with the words, "My religion came from Jesus Christ, who was murdered by the Jews." When British Prime Minister David Lloyd George criticized Dmowski and the committee, Dmowski saw this as a result of Lloyd George's representation of Jewish interests. He refused to admit a single Polish Jew to the National Committee, despite support for such a proposal from Paderewski. A number of American and British Jewish organizations campaigned during the war against their governments recognizing the National Committee. Another leading critic of Dmowski was the historian Sir Lewis Namier, a Jew who served as the British Foreign Office's resident expert on Poland during the war, and who claimed to be personally offended by antisemitic remarks made by Dmowski. Namier fought hard against British recognition of Dmowski and "his chauvinist gang". In turn, Dmowski's experiences at that time convinced him of the existence of an international "Judeo-Masonic conspiracy, unfriendly towards Poland and intransigently hostile to his [Endecja] party".

== Post-World War I ==
Polish territorial demands at the Paris Peace Conference 1919 (Dmowski's Line) on ethnographical background and borders of Polish–Lithuanian Commonwealth 1772

At the end of the World War, two governments claimed to be the legitimate governments of Poland: Dmowski's in Paris and Piłsudski's in Warsaw. To put an end to the rival claims of Piłsudski and Dmowski, the composer Ignacy Jan Paderewski met with both men and persuaded them to reluctantly join forces. Both men had something that the other needed. Piłsudski was in possession of Poland after the war, but as the Pole who had fought with the Austrians for the Central Powers against the Russians, he was distrusted by the Allies. Piłsudski's newly reborn Polish Army, formed from his Polish Legions, needed arms from the Allies, something that Dmowski was much better suited to persuade the Allies to deliver upon. Beyond that, the French were planning to send the Blue Army of General Józef Haller – loyal to Dmowski – back to Poland. The fear was that if Piłsudski and Dmowski did not put aside their differences, a civil war might break out between their partisans. Paderewski was successful in working out a compromise in which Dmowski and himself were to represent Poland at the Paris Peace Conference while Piłsudski was to serve as provisional president of Poland. Not all of Dmowski's supporters accepted this compromise, and on 5 January 1919, Dmowski's partisans (led by Marian Januszajtis-Żegota and Eustachy Sapieha) attempted a failed putsch against Piłsudski.

As a Polish delegate at the Paris Peace Conference and a signatory of the Versailles Treaty, Dmowski exerted a substantial influence on the Treaty's favorable decisions regarding Poland. On 29 January 1919, Dmowski met with the Allies' Supreme War Council for the first time; his five-hour presentation there, delivered in English and French, was described as brilliant. At the meeting, Dmowski stated that he had little interest in laying claim to areas of Ukraine and Lithuania that were formerly part of Poland, but no longer had a Polish majority. At the same time Dmowski strongly pressed for the return of Polish territories with Polish-speaking majorities taken by Prussia from Poland in the 1790s, as well as for some territories beyond Poland's pre-1772 borders, such as southern East Prussia and Upper Silesia. Dmowski himself admitted that from a purely historical point of view, ethnic-linguistic considerations aside, the Polish claims to Silesia were not entirely strong, but he claimed it for Poland on economic grounds, especially the coal fields. Moreover, Dmowski claimed that German statistics had lied about the number of ethnic Poles living in eastern Germany and that "these Poles were some of the most educated and highly cultured in the nation, with a strong sense of nationality and men of progressive ideas". In addition, Dmowski, with the strong backing of the French, wanted to send the "Blue Army" to Poland via Danzig, Germany (modern Gdańsk, Poland); it was the intention of both Dmowski and the French that the Blue Army create a territorial fait accompli. This proposal created much opposition from the Germans, the British and the Americans, and finally the Blue Army was sent to Poland in April 1919 via land. Piłsudski was opposed to needlessly annoying the Allies, and it has been suggested that he did not care much about the Danzig issue.

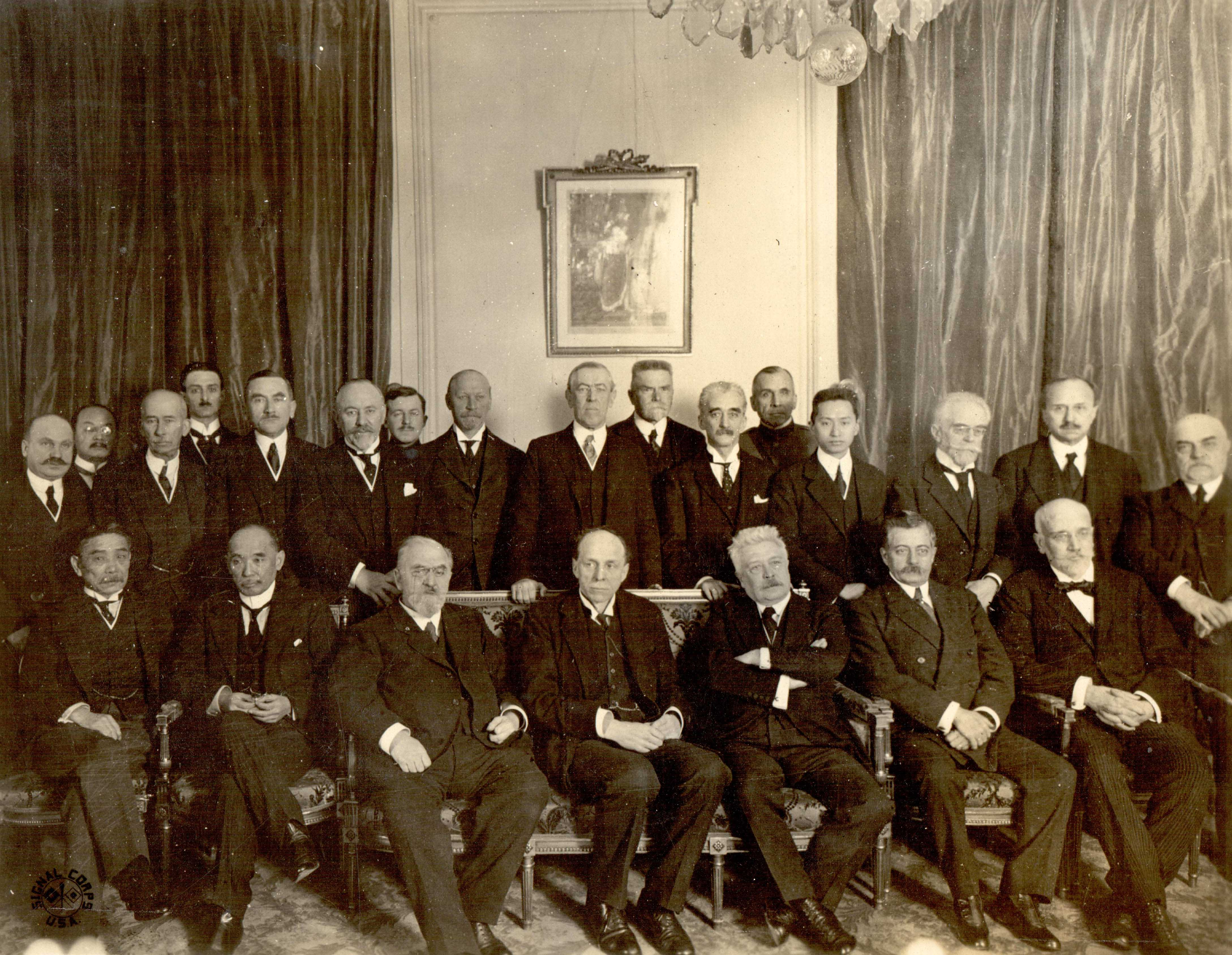
Dmowski (5th from the left, standing) at Paris Peace Conference, 1919

In regard to Lithuania, Dmowski did not view Lithuanians as having a strong national identity, and viewed their social organization as tribal. Those areas of Lithuania that had either Polish majorities or minorities were claimed by Dmowski on the grounds of self-determination. In the areas with Polish minorities, the Poles would act as a civilizing influence; only the northern part of Lithuania, which had a solid Lithuanian majority, was Dmowski willing to concede to the Lithuanians. His initial plans for Lithuania involved giving it an autonomy within a Polish state. This caused Dmowski to have very acrimonious disputes with the Lithuanian delegation at Paris. With regard to the former Austrian province of East Galicia, Dmowski claimed that the local Ukrainians were quite incapable of ruling themselves and also required the civilizing influence of Polish leadership. In addition, Dmowski wished to acquire the oil fields of Galicia. His support for that was however more lackluster than that for other regions, and he opposed Piłsudski's proposal of an alliance or federation with Ukrainians. From the Allied powers only the French supported Polish claims to Galica wholeheartedly. In the end, it was the actual fighting on the ground in Galicia, and not the decisions of the diplomats in Paris, that decided that the region would be part of Poland. The French did not back Dmowski's aspirations in the Cieszyn Silesia region, and instead supported the claims of Czechoslovakia. Dmowski for a long time had praised the Czechs as model for national restoration in face of Germanization, and despite his dispute with Czech political leaders, his opinion of the Czech people as a whole remained positive.

Forever a political opponent of Piłsudski, Dmowski favored what he called a "national state", a state in which the citizens would speak Polish and be of the Roman Catholic faith. If Piłsudski's vision of Poland was based on the historical multiethnic state that had existed under the Jagiellonian dynasty, which he hoped to recreate with a multinational federation (Międzymorze federation), Dmowski's vision was the earlier Polish kingdom ruled by the Piast dynasty, ethnically and religiously homogeneous. Piłsudski believed in a wide definition of Polish citizenship in which peoples of different languages, cultures and faiths were to be united by a common loyalty to the reborn Polish state. Dmowski regarded Piłsudski's views as dangerous nonsense, and felt that the presence of large number of ethnic minorities would undermine the security of Polish state. At the Paris Peace Conference, he argued strenuously against the Minority Rights Treaty forced on Poland by the Allies.

Dmowski himself was disappointed with the Treaty of Versailles, partly because he was strongly opposed to the Minority Rights Treaty imposed on Poland and partly because he wanted the German-Polish border to be somewhat farther to the west than Versailles allowed. Both of these disappointments Dmowski blamed on what he claimed was the "international Jewish conspiracy". Throughout his life, Dmowski maintained that the British Prime Minister David Lloyd George had been bribed by a syndicate of German-Jewish financiers to give Poland what Dmowski considered to be an unfavorable frontier with Germany. His relations with Lloyd George were very poor. Dmowski found Lloyd George to be arrogant, unscrupulous and a consistent advocate of ruling against Polish claims to the West and the East. Dmowski was very offended by Lloyd George's ignorance of Polish affairs and in particular was enraged by his lack of knowledge about river traffic on the Vistula. Dmowski called Lloyd George "the agent of the Jews". Lloyd George in turn claimed in 1939 that "Poland had deserved its fate".

== In independent Poland ==
=== On the sidelines ===
Dmowski was a deputy to the 1919 Legislative Sejm, but he attended only a single session, seeing the Sejm as too chaotic for him to exert much influence; he also spent much of that year either in Paris or recuperating from a lung infection, in Algeria. He did not declare his party affiliation and did not join the Popular National Union. During the Polish-Soviet War he was a member of the Council of National Defense and a vocal critic of Piłsudski's policies. In the aftermath of the war, Polish eastern borders were similar, if somewhat smaller, from what became known as Dmowski's Line.

When the time came to write a Polish constitution in the early 1920s, the National Democrats insisted upon a weak presidency and strong legislative branch. Dmowski was convinced that Piłsudski would become president and saw a weak executive mandate as the best way of crippling his rival. The constitution of 1921 did indeed outline a government with a weak executive branch. When Gabriel Narutowicz, a friend of Piłsudski, was elected president by the Sejm in 1922, he was seen by many among endecja as having been elected with the support of the parties representing the national minorities, with the notable backing of the Polish Jewish politician Yitzhak Gruenbaum. After Narutowicz's election, the National Democrats started a major campaign of vilification of the "Jewish president" elected by "foreigners". Subsequently, a fanatical nationalist, painter Eligiusz Niewiadomski assassinated Narutowicz.

=== Minister of Foreign Affairs ===
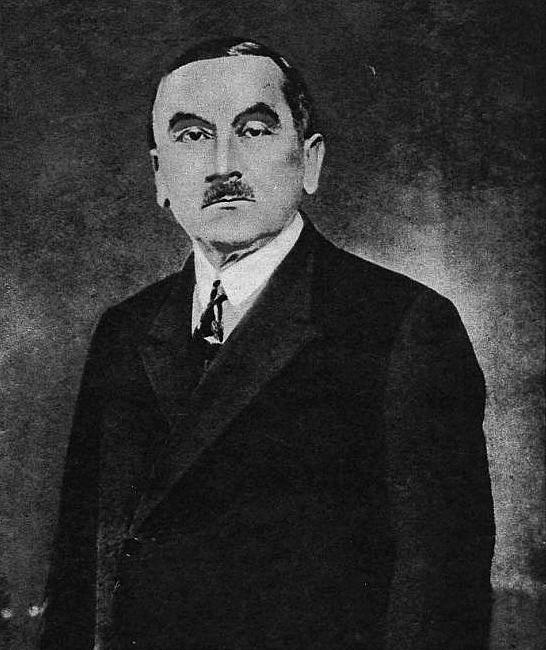
Dmowski 1920s

On 27 October 1923, Wincenty Witos cabinet was reshuffled, and Dmowski took the position of Minister of Foreign Affairs, replacing Marian Seyda. He was one of the leading figures in the government. In the inner circle of decision-makers, he was supposed to represent the "hard line", advocating confrontation and breaking the striking movement.

Introducing his agenda to the Sejm's Foreign Affairs Commission on 16 November 1923, Dmowski stated

In foreign policy, I start from two facts. The first fact is that we have recently acquired borders recognized by the great powers, and the issue of borders no longer exists for us. Poland is a country with a strictly defined territory. The second fact is our internal situation, in which the need to defend our treasure is at the forefront. Based on these assumptions, I believe that our policy must be as peaceful as possible. [...] Our policy must be based on the following principles: 1) respect for and strict adherence to the treaties, 2) non-intervention in the internal affairs of neighbors and other countries, 3) striving for the broadest possible development of our trade relations with the world.

When presenting Poland's attitude towards the victorious countries, he placed particular emphasis on relations with France, stressing that it was "most interested in implementing the Treaty of Versailles."

In the tense international situation caused by the German crisis – after French occupation of the Ruhr – Dmowski pursued a cautious but confident policy. He also managed to ease tensions in Polish-Soviet relations, which had been strained for several years due to the Soviet Union's nonfulfillment of its obligations assumed in the Treaty of Riga and Poland's refusal to recognize the USSR as a federal state. Dmowski's actions as the person responsible for the country's foreign policy did not reveal any ideological concepts, remaining broadly consistent with the policy pursued by Poland since the beginning of 1922. It was an attempt to maintain the status quo: both political and territorial.

Having lost the support of the majority of the Sejm as a result of the secession of a group of 15 peasant deputies and lacking the support of the Marshal and the President, the cabinet resigned. Thus, Dmowski served as Minister of Foreign Affairs for only six weeks.

In the same year he received the Order of Polonia Restituta from the government of Władysław Sikorski.

=== After May coup d'état ===
In 1926, in the aftermath of Piłsudski's May coup d'état, Dmowski founded the Camp of Great Poland (Obóz Wielkiej Polski), though he would find himself more of an ideologue than a leader, as he was displaced by new, younger politicians. In the OWP, he held two highest positions: Chairman of the Great Council and Great Camp-maker (Polish: Wielki Oboźny). In 1928 he founded the National Party (Polish: Stronnictwo Narodowe). He kept publishing newspaper articles, brochures and books. With declining health, he mostly retired from politics by 1930. In 1934, a section of the youth wing of the Endecja found Dmowski insufficiently hardline for their taste and broke away to found the more radical National Radical Camp (known by its Polish acronym as the ONR). His last major campaign was a series of political attacks on the alleged "Judeo-Masonic" associates of President Ignacy Mościcki.

=== Last years ===
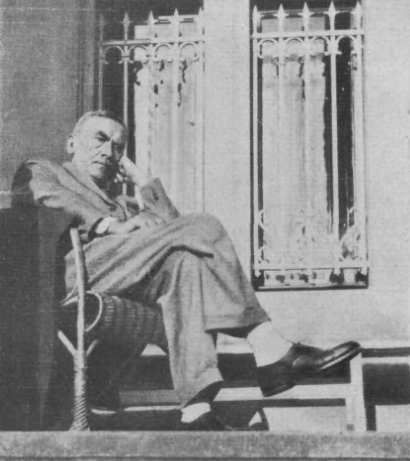
Dmowski in 1936

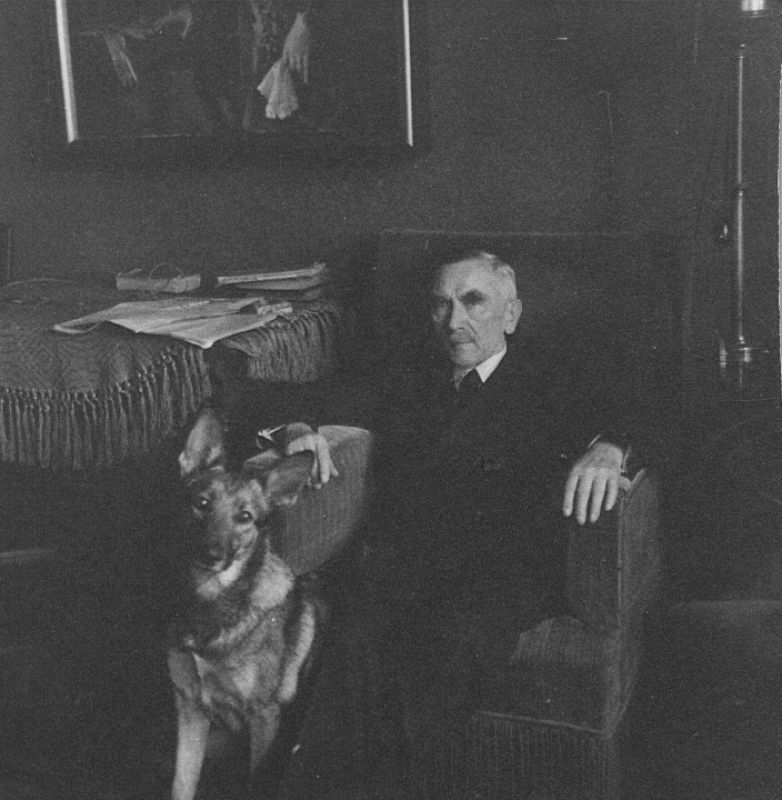
May 1938, Warsaw. Dmowski in the Niklewicz family apartment

His health condition was systematically deteriorating. Władysław Jabłonowski, who spent the summer of 1936 with him in Tłokinia, noted that Dmowski "was neither eager to write, which he liked to do in the countryside, nor to go for long walks, which he was a great fan of; he preferred to sit for hours in the shade of trees." In 1936 his last - not counting reprints - journalistic articles appeared in the press. Writing was already tiring him a lot. He helped a little with editing his writings - subsequent volumes were published until 1939. At the end of 1936 he attended the funeral of his brother, Wacław, who was 6 years older than him. He was the only one left from the whole family. In the spring of 1937 he suffered a mild stroke and from then on he quickly lost his strength. In October of that year he appeared for the last time at a meeting of the Main Committee of the National Party. In March 1938, the president of the Party, Kazimierz Kowalski, obtained Dmowski's permission to organize a series of demonstrations in connection with the Lithuanian crisis. In mid-1938, the Niklewicz family brought him to their estate in Drozdowo, where he lived for another half a year. It resembled palliative care. He had no strength to walk, he lay or sat on the terrace.

== Death and funeral ==
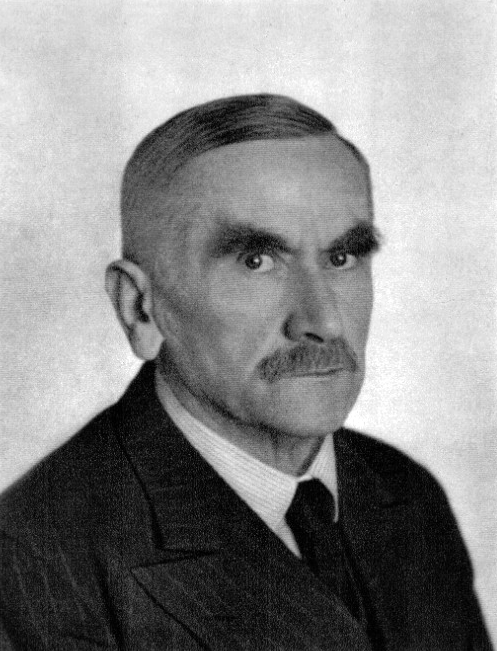
Dmowski c. 1938. The last portrait photo.

Right after Christmas, Dmowski suffered paralysis on the right side of his body and partial speech impairment. In addition, pneumonia occurred. He died on 2 January 1939, shortly after midnight at the age of 74.

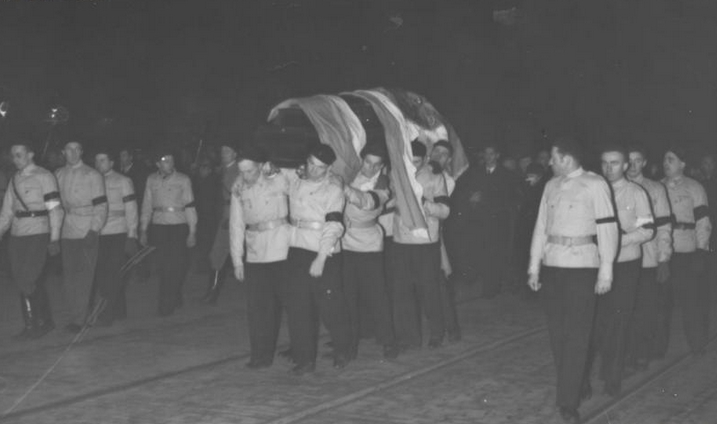
Dmowski's funeral procession, 7 January 1939, Warsaw.

The National Party authorities wanted to embalm the body, but the Niklewicz family, clearly citing Dmowski's wishes, did not consent to it. Roman Dmowski was buried at the Bródno Cemetery in Warsaw in the family grave. His funeral was widely attended, with at least 100,000 attendees; the Piłsudski's legacy sanacja government snubbed him without any official representative attending.

== Political outlook ==
=== Theorist of nationalism ===
From his early student years, Dmowski was opposed to socialism and suspicious of federalism; he desired Polish independence and a strong Polish state, and saw socialism and conciliatory federalist policies as prioritizing an international idea over the national one. Over the years he became an influential European nationalist thinker. Dmowski had a scientist's background and thus preferred logic and reason over emotion and passion. He once told famous pianist Ignacy Jan Paderewski that music was "mere noise". Dmowski felt very strongly that Poles should abandon what he considered to be foolish romantic nationalism and useless gestures of defiance and should instead work hard at becoming businessmen and scientists. Dmowski was very much influenced by Social Darwinist theories, then popular in the Western world, and saw life as a merciless struggle between "strong" nations who dominated and "weak" nations who were dominated.

In his 1902 book Myśli nowoczesnego Polaka (Thoughts of a Modern Pole), Dmowski denounced all forms of Polish Romantic nationalism and traditional Polish values. He sharply criticized the idea of Poland as a spiritual concept and as a cultural idea. Instead Dmowski argued that Poland was merely a physical entity that needed to be brought into existence through pragmatic bargaining and negotiating, not via what Dmowski considered to be pointless revolts – doomed to failure before they even began – against the partitioning powers. For Dmowski, what the Poles needed was a "healthy national egoism" that would not be guided by what Dmowski regarded as the unrealistic political principles of Christianity. In the same book, Dmowski blamed the fall of the old Commonwealth on its tradition of tolerance. While at first critical of Christianity, Dmowski viewed some sects of Christianity as beneficial to certain nations, through not necessarily Poland. Later in 1927 he revised this earlier view and renounced his criticism of Catholicism, seeing it as an essential part of the Polish identity. Dmowski saw all minorities as weakening agents within the nation that needed to be purged. In his 1927 book Kościół, Naród I Państwo (Church, Nation and State), Dmowski wrote:

"Catholicism is not a supplement to Polishness; it is somehow rooted in its very existence and to an important extent it even forms its existence. The attempt to separate Catholicism from Polishness in Poland, cutting off the nation from religion and Church, would mean destroying the very existence of the nation. The Polish State is a Catholic State. This is not because the vast majority of its inhabitants are Catholics or because of the percentage of Catholics. From our point of view, Poland is Catholic in the full sense of the word, because we are a national state, and our people is a Catholic people".

In the pre-war years, the history of Poland was contested terrain as different ideological forces pulled Polish nationalists in opposite directions, represented by Dmowski and Piłsudski. Throughout his career, Dmowski deeply disliked Piłsudski and much of what he stood for. Dmowski came from an impoverished urban background and had little fondness for Poland's traditional elitist social structure. Instead, Dmowski favored a modernizing program and felt Poles should stop looking back nostalgically at the old Polish–Lithuanian Commonwealth, which Dmowski held in deep contempt and should instead embrace the "modern world". In particular, Dmowski despised the old Commonwealth for its multi-national structure and religious tolerance. He saw the ethnic minorities in Poland (Jews, Belarusians, Lithuanians, and Ukrainians) as a direct threat to the cultural identity, integrity and ethnic cohesion of Poland, directly in competition with the Polish petit bourgeoisie (small bourgeoisie, aka semi-autonomous peasantry) with which he identified. Dmowski argued that good citizens should only have one allegiance to the nation, and there is no middle ground. In his ideal view of Poland there would be no ethnic minorities; they would either be polonized or forced to emigrate. The success of his nationalistic ideas, also adopted and propagated by nationalists in other countries (such as Lithuania and Ukraine) contributed to the disappearance of the tolerant, multiethnic Polish-Lithuanian identity.

Dmowski admired Italian Fascism. In the summer of 1926 Dmowski wrote a series of articles admiring Mussolini and the Italian fascist model, and helped organize the Camp of Great Poland (OWP), a broad anti-Sanacja front modeled on Italian fascism that was known for its anti-Jewish rhetoric and violence. Later he nonetheless tried to ensure that OWM would not blindly imitate the Italian or German models.

=== Antisemitism ===
Dmowski often communicated his belief in an "international Jewish conspiracy" aimed against Poland. In his essay Żydzi wobec wojny (Jews on the War) written about World War I, Dmowski claimed that Zionism was only a cloak to disguise the Jewish ambition to rule the world. Dmowski asserted that once a Jewish state was established in Palestine, it would form "the operational basis for action throughout the world". In the same essay, Dmowski accused the Jews of being Poland's most dangerous enemy and of working hand in hand with the Germans to dismember Poland again. Dmowski believed that the 3,000,000 Polish Jews were far too numerous to be absorbed, and assimilated into the Polish Catholic culture. Dmowski had advocated emigration of the entire Jewish population of Poland as the solution to what he regarded as Poland's "Jewish problem", and over time came to argue for increasing harsh measures against the Jewish minority, though he never suggested killing Jews. He opposed physical violence, arguing for the boycotts of Jewish businesses instead, later supplemented with their separation in the cultural area (through policies such as numerus clausus). Dmowski made anti-Semitism a central element in Endecja's radical nationalist outlook. Endecja's crusade against Jewish cultural values gained mounting intensity in the antisemitism of the 1930s, but there were no major pogroms or violent attacks on the Jews in Poland until the German occupation of Poland in 1939. In his 1931 novel Dziedzictwo, Dmowski wrote: "A Jewish woman will always be a Jew, a Jewish man, a Jew. They have another skin, they smell differently, they carry the evil among the nations". In his 1938 essay Hitleryzm a Źydzi, Dmowski wrote:

"The tool of the Jews was Wilson, who was concerned that the Allied troops did not cross the German border...Lloyd George stopped regions from becoming part of Poland as they were before: the great majority of our Upper Silesia, Malbork, Sztum and Kwidzyn, and also Gdansk. Lloyd George acted like an agent of the Jews, and nothing gave the impression that Wilson was any less dependent on them. The Jews, therefore, negotiated an agreement with German Freemasonry, who, in return for help at the conference on the border question, agreed to provide them with a leading position in the German Republic. Eventually, after the peace, the Jews worked for Germany and against Poland in England, America, and even in France, but especially strove so that Germany became less and less a German state and more a Jewish one".

For Dmowski, one of Poland's principal problems was that not enough Polish-speaking Catholics were middle-class, while too many ethnic Germans and Jews were. To remedy this perceived problem, he envisioned a policy of confiscating the wealth of Jews and ethnic Germans and redistributing it to Polish Catholics. Dmowski was never able to have this program passed into law by the Sejm, but the National Democrats did frequently organize "Buy Polish" boycott campaigns against German and Jewish shops. The first of Dmowski's antisemitic boycotts occurred in 1912 when he attempted to organize a total boycott of Jewish businesses in Warsaw as "punishment" for the defeat of some Endecja candidates in the elections for the Duma, which Dmowski blamed on Warsaw's Jewish population. Throughout his life, Dmowski associated Jews with Germans as Poland's principal enemies; the origins of this identification stemmed from Dmowski's deep anger over the forcible Germanisation policies carried out by the German government against its Polish minority during the Imperial period, and over the fact that most Jews living in the disputed German/Polish territories had chosen to assimilate into German culture, not Polish culture. In Dmowski's opinion the Jewish community was not attracted to the cause of Polish independence and was likely to ally itself with potential enemies of the Polish state if it benefited their status.

Dmowski was also a vocal opponent of freemasonry, as well as of feminism.

== Recognition and legacy ==
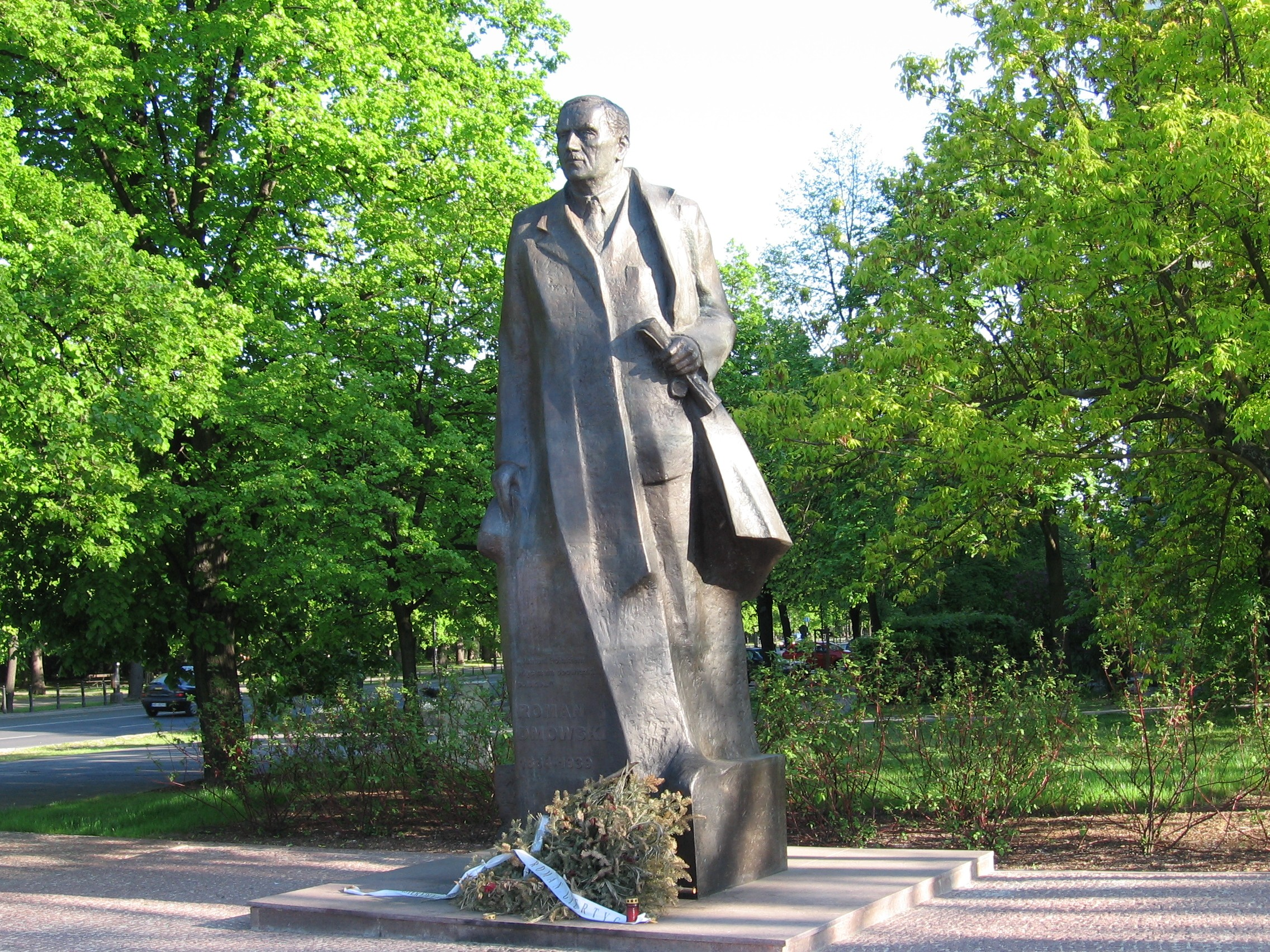
Statue of Dmowski in Warsaw

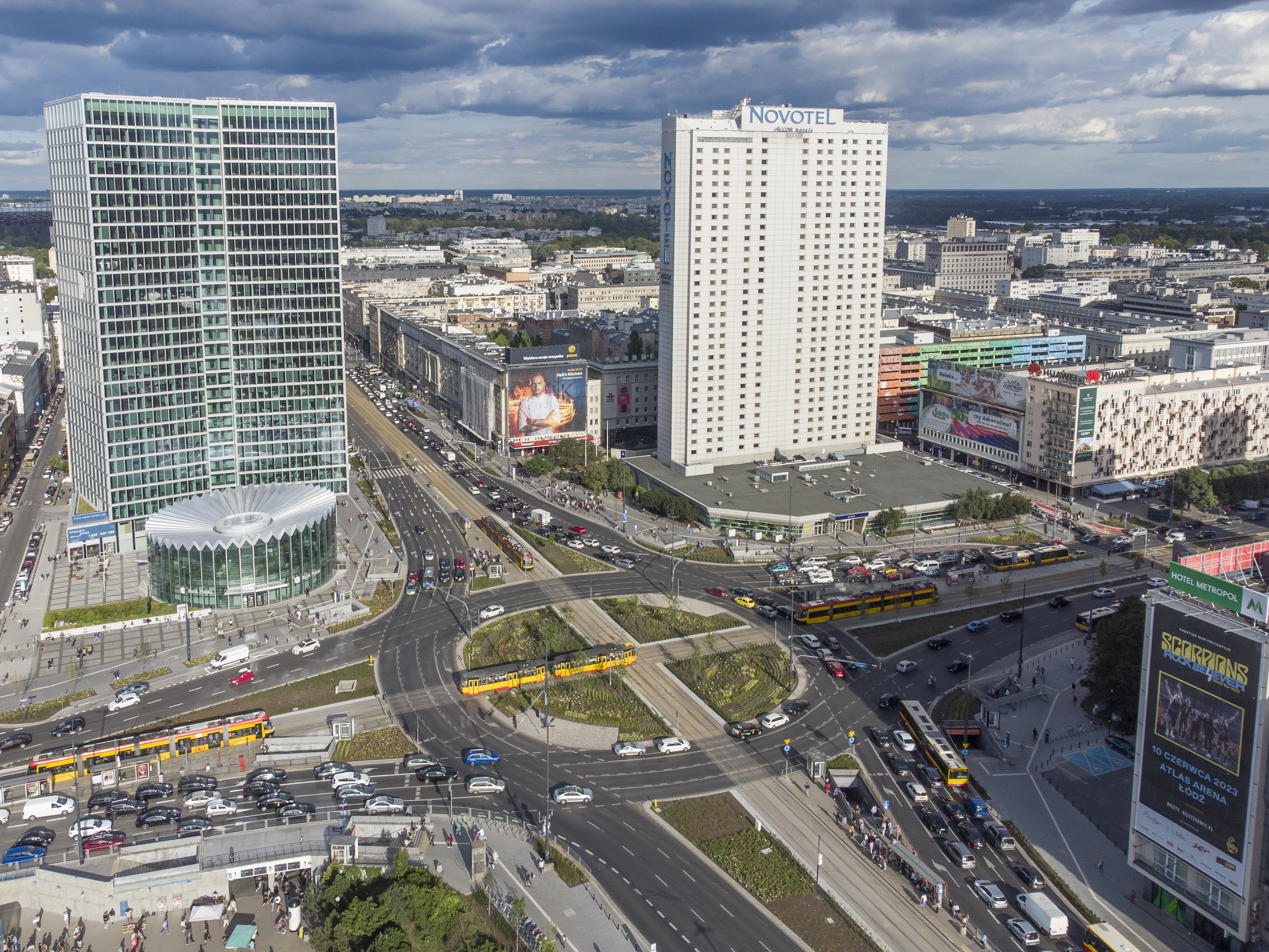
The Roman Dmowski Roundabout in Warsaw in 2022

Dmowski is considered one of the most influential conservative politicians in the history of modern Poland, although his legacy is controversial and he continues to be a highly polarizing figure. He has been called "the father of Polish nationalism" and the "icon of the contemporary Polish political right" who, as a signatory of the Treaty of Versailles, played a critical role in the restoration of Polish independence after World War I. Conversely, he has been described as the founder of contemporary Polish antisemitism and criticized for his disdain for women's rights. Dmowski's life and work has been subject to numerous academic articles and books. Andrzej Walicki in 1999 noted that main sources on Dmowski are Andrzej Micewski's Roman Dmowski (1971), Roman Wapiński's Roman Dmowski (1988) and Krzysztof Kawalec's Roman Dmowski (1996).

Suppressed in communist Poland, Dmowski's legacy has been more widely recognised since the fall of communism in 1989. A bridge in Wrocław was named after him in 1992. In November 2006 a statue of Roman Dmowski was unveiled in Warsaw; it led to a series of protests from organizations which see Dmowski as a fascist and an enemy of progressive politics; due to similar protests plans to raise statues or memorials elsewhere have been delayed. The political commentator, Janusz Majcherek, wrote in 2005: "Instead of a modern Conservative Party, such as was able to modernize Britain or Spain, we find in Poland a cheap copy of the Endecja, in which an old-fashioned pre-war nationalism mingles with a pre-Vatican II Catholicism, united in its rejection of modernization and mistrust of the West". Both Jarosław Kaczyński and Lech Kaczyński have cited Dmowski as an inspiration. Lech, then the mayor of Warsaw, supported the erection of the Dmowski statue in 2006.

On 8 January 1999, he was honoured by the Polish Sejm with special legislation "for his achievement for the independence of Poland and expansion of Polish national consciousness". The document honours him also for founding Polish school of political realism and responsibility, shaping Polish (especially the Western) borders and "emphasizing the firm connection between Catholicism and Polishness for the survival of the Nation and the rebuilding of the State".

== Honours ==
Roman Dmowski was awarded several state awards, honorary degrees and titles as:

=== Polish orders ===
- Order of the White Eagle (2018)
- Order of Polonia Restituta (1923)

=== Foreign orderes ===
- Order of the Star of Romania (Romania)
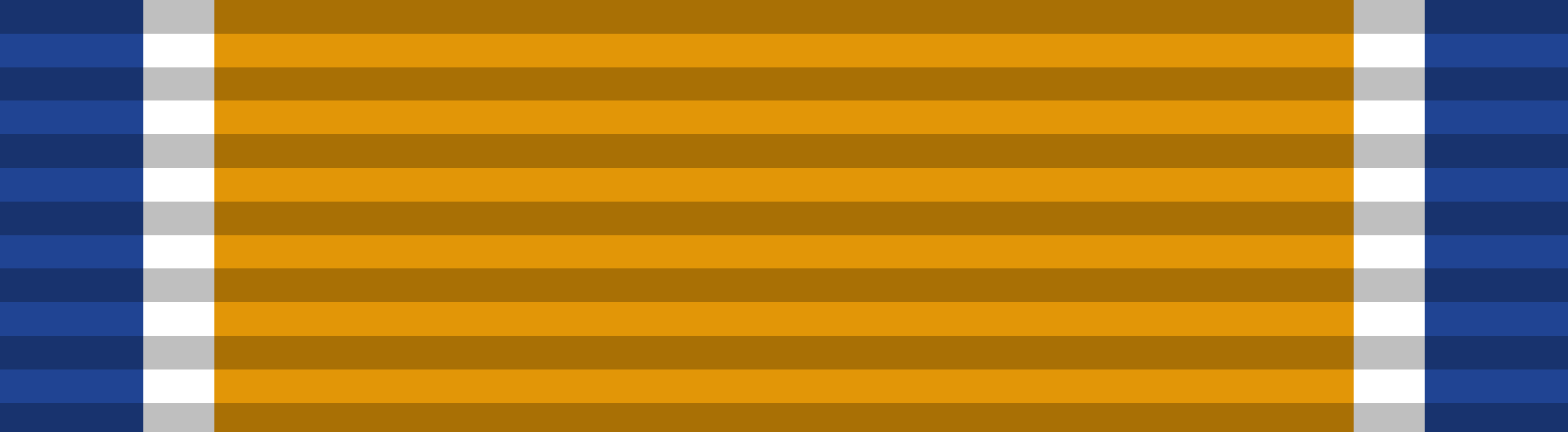
- Order of Orange-Nassau (Netherlands)

=== Honorary degrees ===
- Honorary degree of Doctor of Laws (LL.D.) from the University of Cambridge (Cambridge, Cambridgeshire, UK) on 11 August 1916
- Honorary degree of Doctor of Philosophy (PhD) from the University of Poznań (Poznań, Poznań Voivodeship, PL) on 10 June 1923

=== Honorary titles ===
- Baltia Student Corporation of Poznań University (Patron and first honorary Philistine, 1921)
- All-Polish Youth (Honorary president, 1922)

=== Literary awards ===
- Jan Kasprowicz Literary Award of the City of Poznań (6 December 1927)

== Selected works ==
- Myśli nowoczesnego Polaka (Thoughts of a Modern Pole), 1902.
- Niemcy, Rosja a sprawa polska (Germany, Russia and the Polish Cause), 1908. French translation published under the title: La question polonaise (Paris 1909).
- Separatyzm Żydów i jego źródła (Separatism of Jews and its Sources), 1909.
- Upadek myśli konserwatywnej w Polsce (The Decline of Conservative Thought in Poland), 1914.
- Polityka polska i odbudowanie państwa (Polish Politics and the Rebuilding of the State), 1925.
- Zagadnienie rządu (On Government), 1927.
- Kościół, naród i państwo (The Church, Nation and State), 1927.
- Świat powojenny i Polska (The World after War and Poland), 1931.
- Przewrót (The Coup), 1934.

== See also ==
- History of Poland (1918-1939)
- Poland in World War I
- Dmowski's Line
