= 6th Sich Rifle Infantry Division =

6th Sich Rifle Division
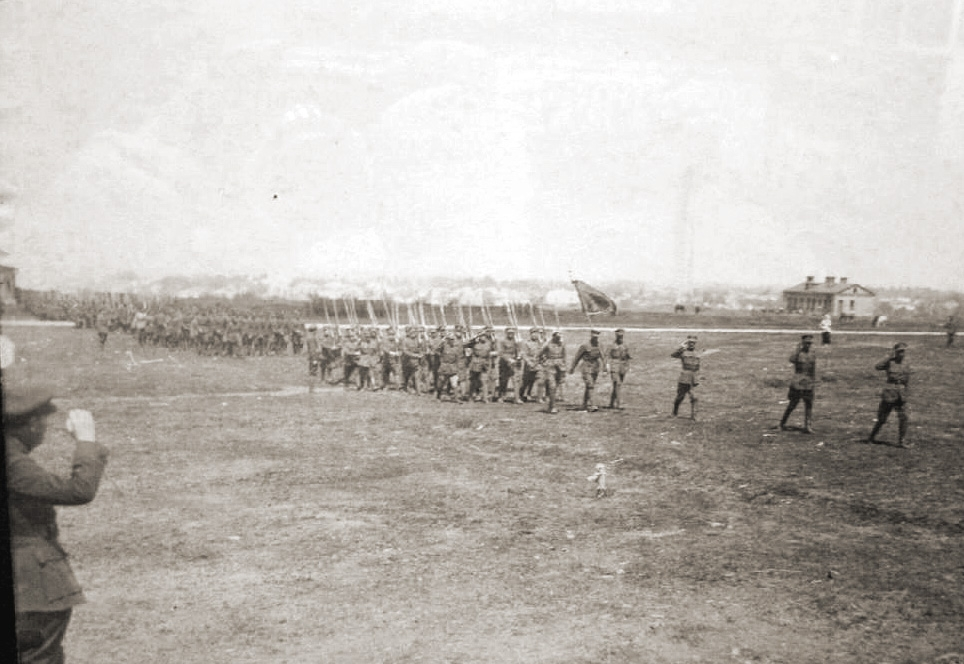
- The division's parade in front of Symon Petlura, Berdychiv, April 1920
- Active: February 1920–1921
- Country: Ukrainian People's Republic
- Type: Infantry
- Engagements: Soviet–Ukrainian War

Commanders
- First and only commander: Marko Bezruchko

6th Sich Rifle Infantry Division was an infantry division of the Ukrainian People's Army. It fought in the Kiev offensive of 1920, garrisoned Kyiv, and later fought in further actions against the Red Army, including the Battle of Komarów.

The division operated as part of the Polish 2nd Army from April to May, and then as part of the Polish 3rd Army from May to August.

== Formation ==
This division was initially formed in Łańcut, and then in the Brest-Litovsk fortress. Later it received the title of the "6th Sich Division" and was commanded by pidpolkovnyk Marko Bezruchko.

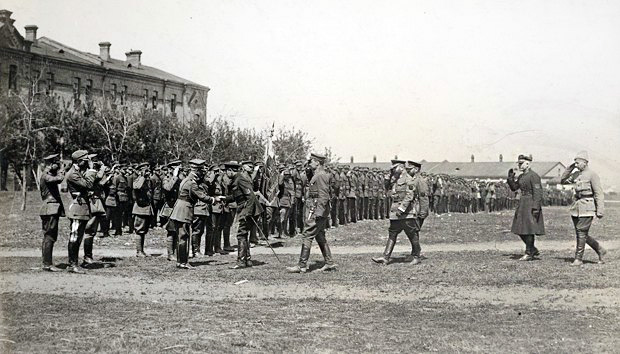
Banner's presentation to the 6th Sich Rifle Division. Symon Petliura, gen. Volodymyr Salsky, gen. Antoni Listowski, Berdychiv, 21 April 1920

By April 1920, the 6th Division had undergone intensive one-and-a-half-month training in Berdychiv, whose military garrison it formed. The division was additionally replenished with Ukrainian soldiers from other internment camps. Simultaneously, its personnel were fully armed, as the division received all the necessary military equipment and horses. At this time, the division's 6th Reserve Brigade was formed with a temporary headquarters in this city. After inspecting the division in Berdychiv, the Chief Ataman of the UPR's Army, Symon Petliura, presented the division with a raspberry-coloured Cossack flag with a golden trident in a blue upper rectangle with the inscription "For the Liberation of Ukraine".

== 1920 ==
On April 22, it was subordinated to the Polish 3rd Army and was ordered to march to the front. At that time, it numbered over 2,000 soldiers.

According to Lech Wyszczelski, in May 1920, the 6th Sich Rifle Division was a

"very weak tactical relationship (...) it had few cadres enabling it to achieve the status of the Polish division in the long term."

=== Summer ===
==== Kyiv Garrison (May–June 1920) ====
From May 8 to June 9, 1920, the 6th Division was in Kyiv as the capital's Ukrainian garrison. The division partook in the Polish-Ukrainian victory parade on the Khreshchatyk. On 12 June 1920, the 6th Division had 225 officers and 1,720 soldiers (of which 301 were untrained).

==== August ====
In August 1920, the division, together with the Polish 31st Rifle Regiment, successfully defended Zamość from the 29 to 31 August, against Budyonny's 1st Cavalry Army, which contributed to the victory at the Battle of Warsaw.

=== Autumn ===
==== September ====
In September 1920, the division was transferred to Galicia, where it shared the fate of the UPR's Army. In late September, the division liberated Proskuriv and Starokostiantyniv counties.

==== October ====
On October 1–6, the 6th Division led forces fighting with the Red Army on Vinkivtsi. Already after the supposed end of hostilities under the Treaty of Riga, the 6th Division entered the villages of Vinkovetsky district (modern Khmelnytskyi Region) on October 13. On October 15, the offensive began in Bar. At the end of October the division's headquarters were in Bar.

==== November 1920 ====
On 7 November 1920, it had 407 officers and 4,143 soldiers.

The division suffered heavy losses in the final battles (November 1920) near Popivtsi, which began on November 10 - the second day after the signing of the peace - and continued with the November 11th attack on Katsmaziv village until the defeat near Popivtsi. Thereafter, the division's soldiers were in interned in Polish internment camps at Alexander Kujawski and Szczypiorno.

== 1921 ==
The Reserve Brigade which was the division's training part during wartime, continued to exist in Brest until the Second Winter Campaign in the fall of 1921 and the tragedy near Bazar, where the division's officers and soldiers imprisoned by the Bolsheviks, were brutally shot.

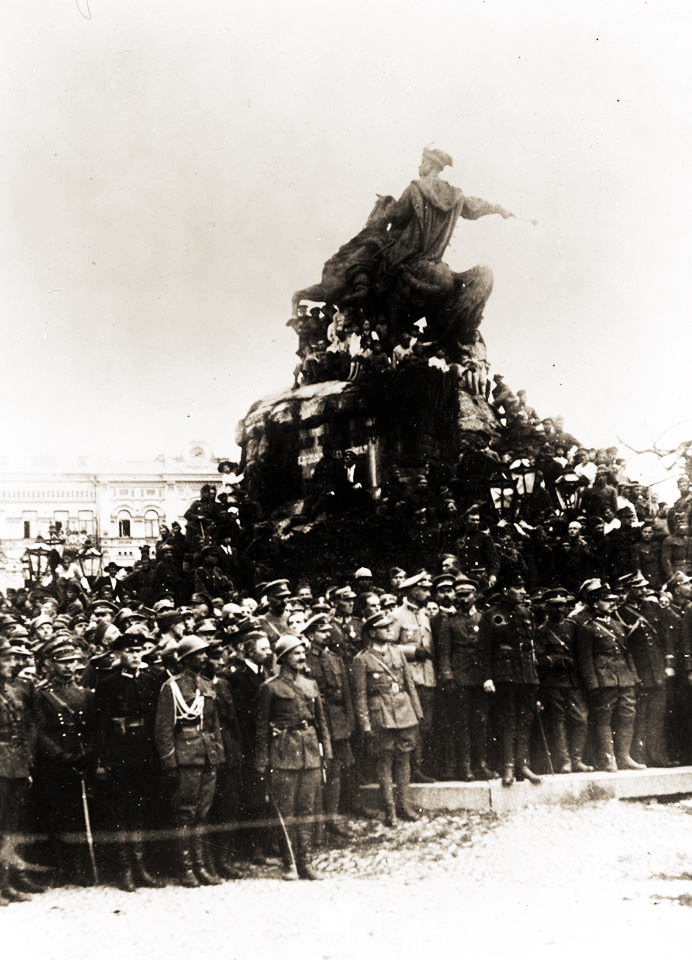
Symon Petliura, surrounded by Ukrainian and Polish officers, welcomes the parade of the 6th Sich Rifle Division at the Bohdan Khmelnytsky Monument, Kyiv, May 23, 1920.

== The division's composition in July 1920 ==
Commander - Marko Bezruchko

- Chief of Staff - Vsevolod Zmienko
  - Staff's Sotnia
  - Officers' Sotnia
  - Telegraph Platoon
  - Field Gendarmerie Platoon
- 16th Infantry Brigade - Roman Sushko
  - 46th Rifle Kurin
  - 47th Rifle Kurin
- 17th Infantry Brigade - Oleksa Voroniv
  - 49th Rifle Kurin
  - 50th Rifle Kurin
- 6th Cavalry Regiment - Volodymyr Gerasimenko
  - 1st Mounted Sotnia
  - 2nd Mounted Sotnia
  - 3rd Mounted Sotnia
- 6th Field Artillery Regiment - Valentyn Nasoniv
  - 16th Field Artillery Battery
  - 17th Field Artillery Battery
- 6th Technical Kurin - Volodymyr Bokitko
  - 1st Sapper Company
  - 2nd Sapper Company
- Railway Company
- Ammunition Company (Park)
- 6th Reserve Rifle Brigade

== Bibliography ==
- Potocki, Robert (1999). Idea restytucji Ukraińskiej Republiki Ludowej (1920-1939) (in Polish). Lublin: Instytut Europy Środkowo-Wschodniej. ISBN 9788385854463.
- Thomas, Nigel (2014). Armies of the Russo-Polish War 1919–21. Men-at-Arms. Oxford: Osprey Publishing. ISBN 9781472801067.
- Wyszczelski, Lech (2010). "Operacja ukraińska Wojska Polskiego" [Ukrainian operation of the Polish Army]. Wojna polsko-rosyjska 1919–1920 [Polish–Russian War 1919–1920] (in Polish). Vol. 1 (1 ed.). Warsaw: Bellona. pp. 381, 696. ISBN 978-83-11-11934-5.
- Оборона Замостя VI дивізією Армії УНР у 1920 р. [Defense of Zamość by the VI Division of the Army of the Ukrainian People's Republic in 1920] (in Ukrainian). Toronto: Укр. воєнно-іст. ін-т [Ukrainian Institute of Military History]. 1956.
- Karpus, Z.; Sribnyak, I. (2000). "Формування з'єднань Армії УНР у Польщі в 1920 рр" [Formation of units of the Army of the Ukrainian People's Republic in Poland in 1920]. Ukrainian Historical Journal. 1: 81–89.
- Wiszka, Emilian (2012). Szósta Siczowa Dywizja Strzelecka Armii Ukraińskiej Republiki Ludowej. Formowanie, szlak bojowy, internowanie 1920—1924 [Sixth Sich Rifle Division of the Ukrainian People's Army. Formation, combat trail, internment 1920—1924] (in Polish). Toruń: Wydawnictwo Nukowe Uniwersytetu Mikołaja Kopernika. p. 513. ISBN 978-83-231-2926-4.
