= Kiev offensive (1920) =

Part of the Polish–Soviet War

Coordinates: 50°27′N 30°31′E

- Part of the Polish–Soviet War, Ukrainian-Soviet War and the Ukrainian War of Independence
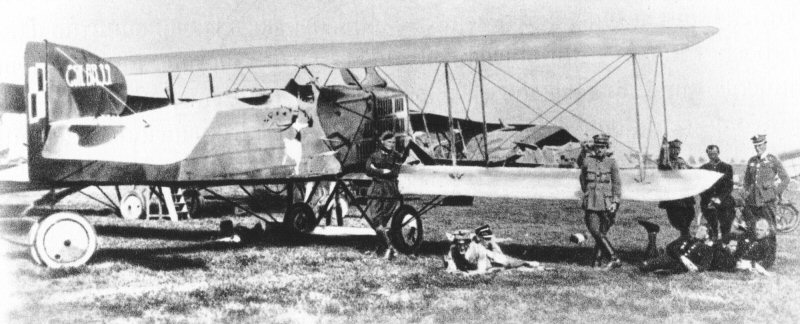
- Polish Bréguet 14 operating from Kiev airfield
Date	25 April – July 1920 (2 months and 6 days)
Location	Ukraine
Result	Red Army victory

Belligerents
Poland; Ukrainian People's Republic	Russian SFSR; Ukrainian SSR

Commanders and leaders
Józef Piłsudski; Edward Rydz-Śmigły (Ukrainian People's Republic) Symon Petliura	(Russian Soviet Federative Socialist Republic) Alexander Yegorov (Russian Soviet Federative Socialist Republic) Semyon Budyonny (Russian Soviet Federative Socialist Republic) Iona Yakir

Strength
8 infantry divisions 1 cavalry division 2 understrength Ukrainian divisions. 64,000 men initially.	8 infantry divisions 2 cavalry divisions later also 1st Cavalry Army. Over 50,000 men initially, including 15,000 battle-ready soldiers.

The 1920 Kiev offensive (or Kiev expedition, Polish: wyprawa kijowska) was a major part of the Polish–Soviet War. It was an attempt by the armed forces of the recently established Second Polish Republic led by Józef Piłsudski, in alliance with the Ukrainian People's Republic led by Symon Petliura, to seize the territories of modern-day Ukraine which mostly fell under Soviet control after the October Revolution as the Russian Soviet Republic.

Polish and Soviet forces fought in 1919 and the Poles advanced in the disputed borderlands. In early 1920, Piłsudski concentrated on preparations for a military invasion of central Ukraine. It would result, he anticipated, in destruction of the Soviet armies and force Soviet acceptance of unilateral Polish conditions. The Poles signed an alliance, known as the Treaty of Warsaw, with the forces of the Ukrainian People's Republic. The Kiev offensive was the central component of Piłsudski's plan for a new order in Eastern Europe centered around a Polish-led Intermarium federation. The stated goal of the operation was to create a formally independent Ukraine, although its dependence on Poland was inherent to Piłsudski's plans. Ukrainians ended up fighting on both sides of the conflict.

The campaign was conducted from April to July 1920. The Polish Army faced the forces of the Russian Soviet Republic. At first, the war was successful for the allied Polish and Ukrainian armies, which captured Kiev (Kyiv) on 7 May 1920, but soon the campaign's progress was dramatically reversed due to a Red Army counter-offensive, in which the 1st Cavalry Army of Semyon Budyonny played a prominent part. In the wake of the Soviet advance, the short-lived Galician Soviet Socialist Republic was created. The Polish-Soviet War ended with the Peace of Riga of 1921, which settled the border between Poland and the Russian Soviet Republic.

== Background ==
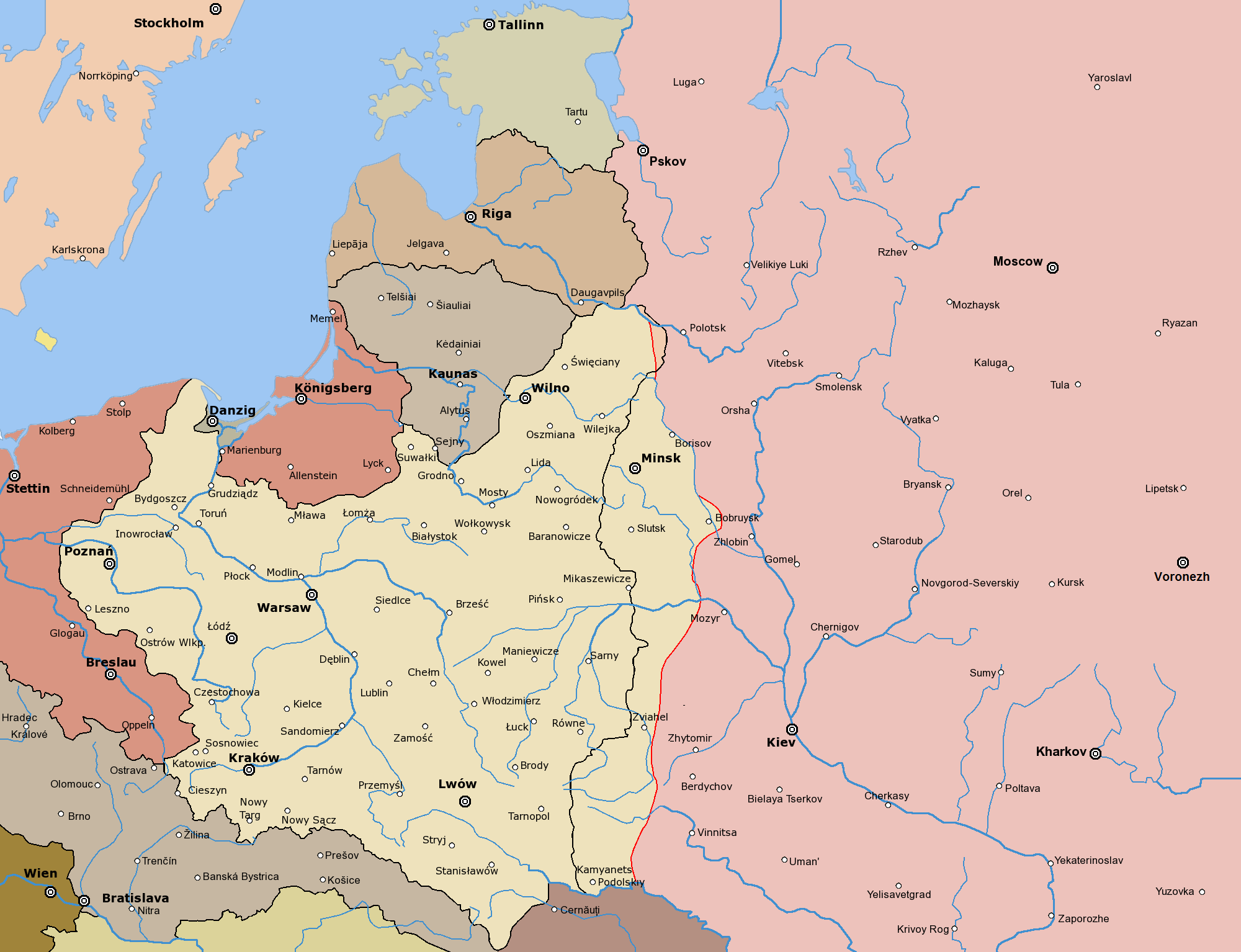
Polish-held territory in December 1919

By late autumn 1919, many Polish activists from different political formations concluded that Poland, generally successful in pushing the Red Army forces to the east and gaining territory there, should now pursue peace by negotiating with Soviet Russia. The authorities increasingly had to deal with public protests and anti-war demonstrations. The Soviets also faced pressures to negotiate resolutions to the regional conflicts they were involved in. They launched diplomatic initiatives aimed at the eastern Baltic region states and Romania, which eventually resulted in treaties and improved relations.

Soviet Russia had not given up its mission of establishing a European Soviet Republic, but its leaders felt now that their goal could be accomplished at some time in the future, not necessarily immediate. They decided that peace with Poland would be desirable and on 22 December 1919, People's Commissar for Foreign Affairs Georgy Chicherin sent Warsaw the first of several peace offers. For the time being, the Soviets proposed a demarcation line at the current military frontiers, leaving permanent border issues to future determinations.

Some Polish politicians, including a majority on the Foreign and Military Affairs Committee of Polish parliament, insisted on negotiating with the Soviets. Socialist and agrarian leaders discussed the issue with Prime Minister Leopold Skulski. The National Democracy politicians had hoped that talks with the Soviets would derail the plans for Józef Piłsudski's alliance with Symon Petliura and resumption of the war with Russia, which they opposed. National Democrats did not believe that poor and relatively weak Poland was capable of carrying out Piłsudski's objective of building and leading an anti-Russian federation of states. The Soviet peace offers were rejected by Piłsudski, who did not trust the Russians and openly preferred to get the issues resolved on the battlefield. He had stated, on many occasions, that he could beat the Bolsheviks whenever and wherever he wanted to. On 22 April 1920, Stanisław Grabski, a National Democrat, resigned in protest his chairmanship of the parliamentary committee.

In the early months of 1920, Polish representatives engaged in pretended negotiations, as directed by Piłsudski. Stanisław Wojciechowski, Poland's future president, wrote that Poland had squandered the opportunity to conclude peace with the Soviets when they were most inclined to allow it.

Piłsudski was convinced that a rapid strike at the Soviet forces on the southern front would throw the Red Army far beyond the Dnieper River; consequently, the Soviets would have to accept the peace proposals presented by Poland. He argued that war provided optimal growth conditions for Polish industry and was an effective way to fight unemployment and its consequences. General Kazimierz Sosnkowski, Piłsudski's close collaborator, claimed that war had turned out to be a highly profitable enterprise for state treasury.

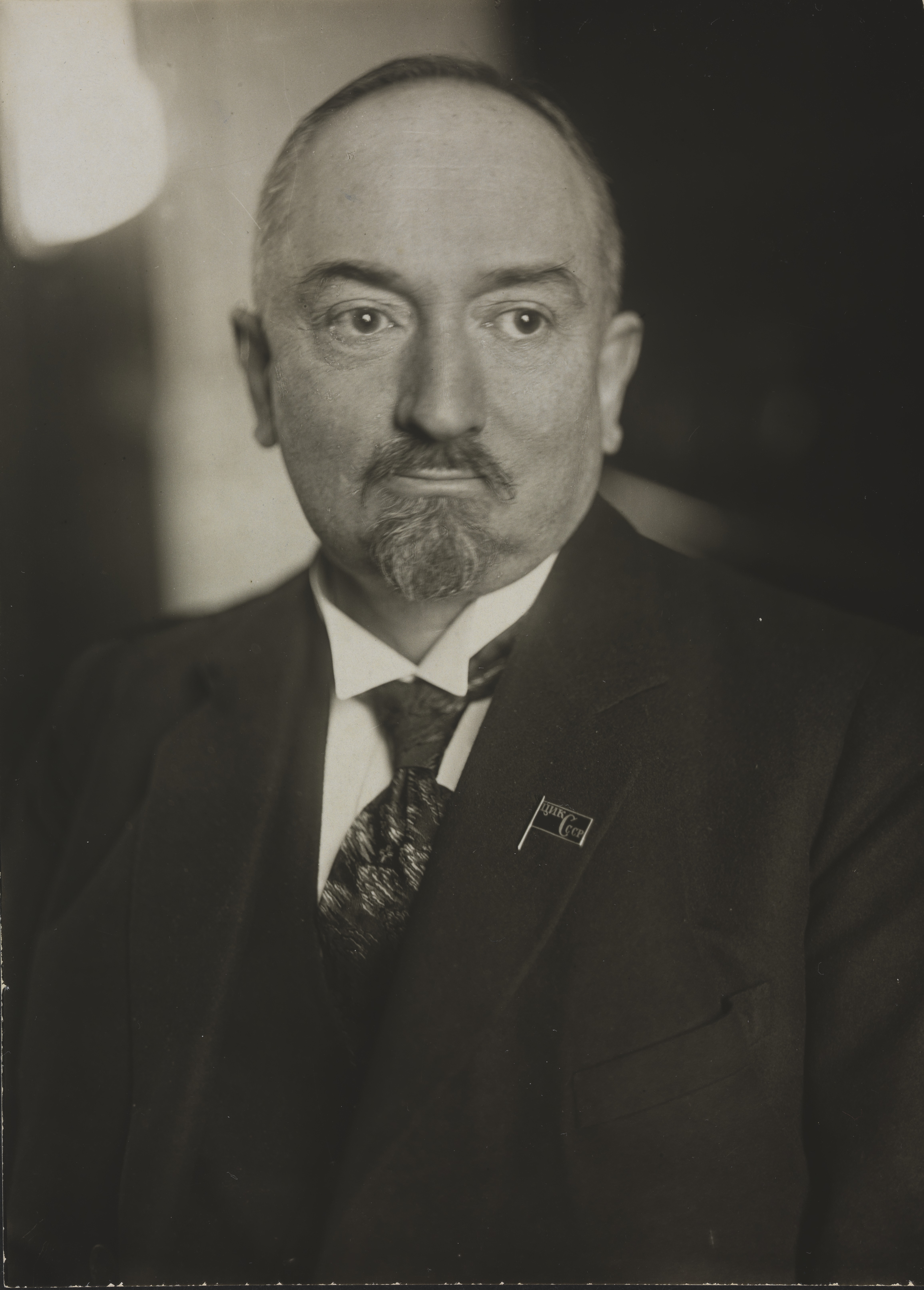
Soviet Russia's Commissar for Foreign Affairs Georgy Chicherin

Following fruitless exchanges with Foreign Minister Stanisław Patek, after 7 April Chicherin accused Poland of rejecting the Russian peace offer and heading for war; he notified the Allies and called on them to restrain the Polish aggression. The Poles claimed that the Russian Western Front presented an immediate danger and was about to launch an attack, but the narrative was not seen as convincing in the West (the Western Front forces were rather weak at that time and had no plans for an offensive). Soviet Russia's arguments turned out to be more persuasive and the image of Poland had suffered.

The Soviets came to realize that the Polish side was not interested in an armistice at the end of February. First, they suspected a strike in the north, in the direction of the so-called Smolensk Gateway. Vladimir Lenin ordered strengthening of the Western Front defenses. The Polish attack in the Polesia and Volhynia borderlands on 7 March, led by Władysław Sikorski, as well as other actions, reinforced the Soviet suspicions. Sikorski's offensive separated the Soviet Western and Southwestern Fronts. Additional Red Army troops were brought hurriedly from the Caucasian Front and from elsewhere. However, as the Soviet intelligence informed of concentrations of Polish forces in the south and in the north, the Soviet leaders had been unable to determine where the main Polish offensive was going to take place.

== Ukrainian involvement ==
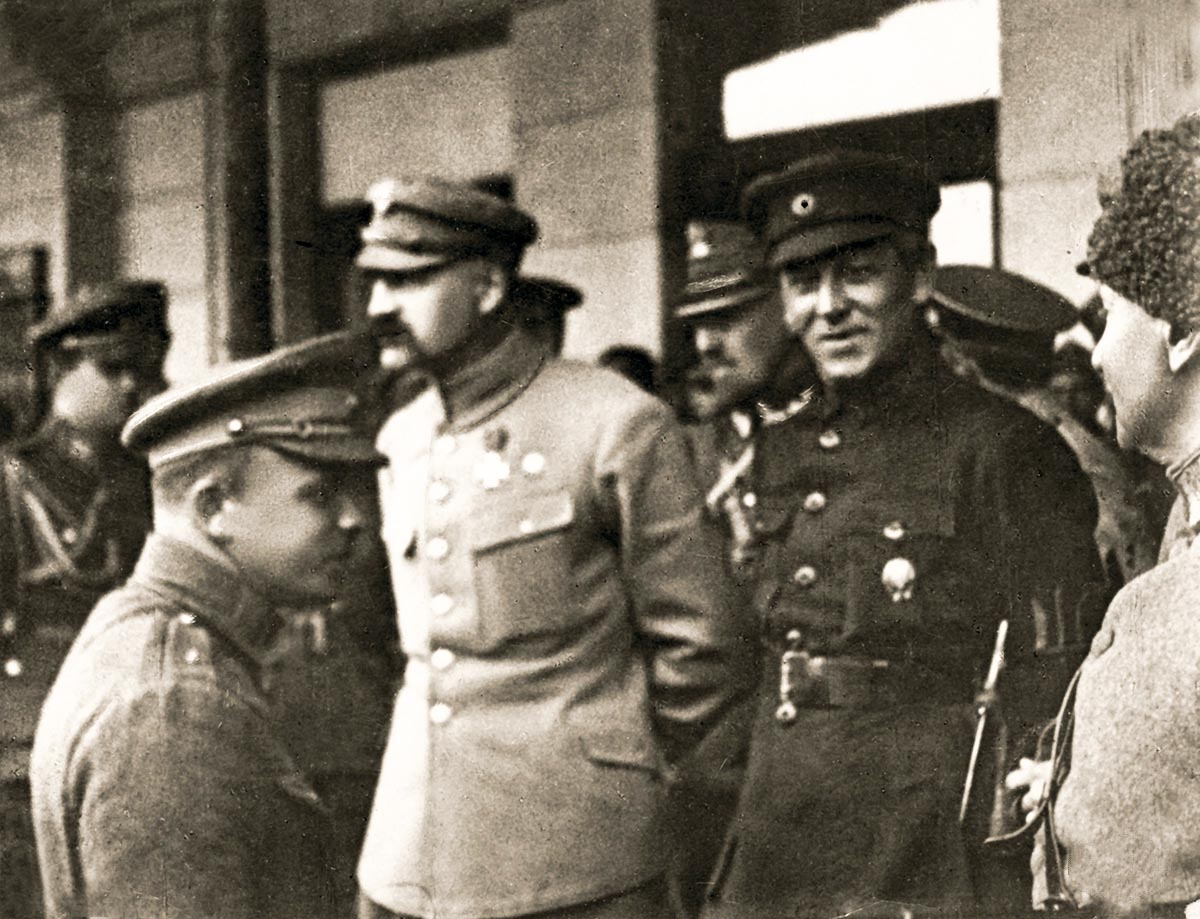
Józef Piłsudski and Symon Petliura in Vinnytsia, May 1920

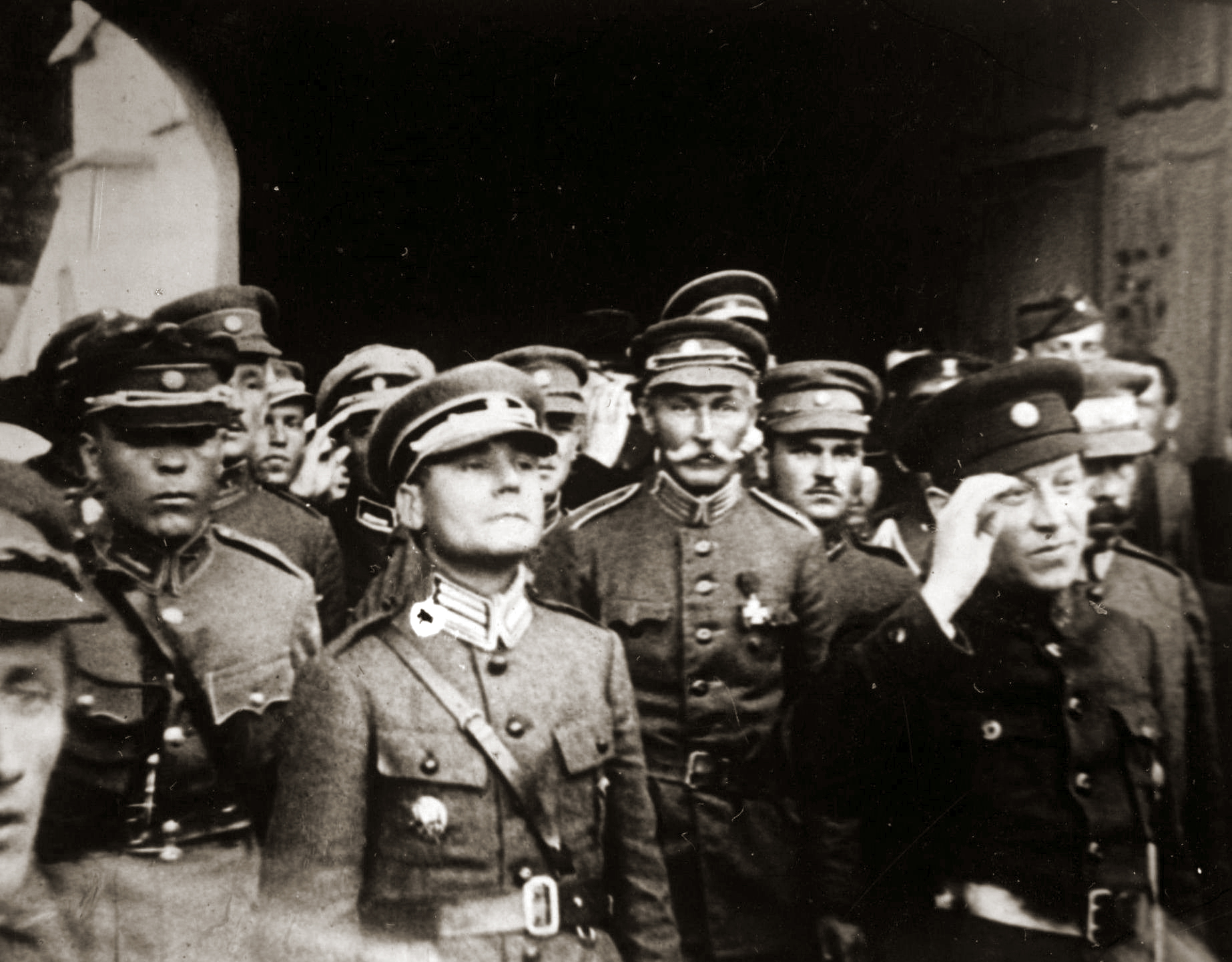
Petliura and other officers of the Ukrainian People's Army in Kiev

Since early 1919, the government of the Ukrainian People's Republic (UPR) faced mounting attacks on the territory it claimed. It had lost control over most of Ukraine, which became divided among several disparate powers: Anton Denikin's Whites, the Red Army and pro-Soviet formations, Nestor Makhno's Revolutionary Insurgent Army in the southeast, the Kingdom of Romania in the southwest, Poland, and various bands lacking any political ideology. During the Polish–Ukrainian War, UPR forces fought the Polish Army. An armistice was signed by the combatants on 1 September 1919; it foresaw common action against the Bolsheviks.

The city of Kiev had undergone numerous changes of government. The UPR was established in 1917; a Bolshevik uprising was suppressed in January 1918. The Red Army took Kiev in February, followed by the Army of the German Empire in March; Ukrainian forces retook the city in December. In February 1919, the Red Army regained control. In August, it was taken first by the UPR and then by Denikin's army. The Soviets were in control again from December 1919 (the Ukrainian Soviet Socialist Republic had its temporary capital in Kharkiv).

By the time of the Polish offensive, the UPR had been defeated by the Red Army and controlled only a small sliver of land near the territory administered by Poland. Under these circumstances, Petliura saw no choice but to accept Piłsudski's offer of joining an alliance with Poland despite many unresolved territorial disputes between the two nations. By 16 November 1919, Polish forces had taken over Kamianets-Podilskyi and the surrounding areas, and the Polish authorities allowed the UPR to establish its official state structures there, including military recruiting (while advancing Poland's own claims to the territory). On 2 December, Ukrainian diplomats led by Andriy Livytskyi declared that they had given up Ukrainian claims to Eastern Galicia and western Volhynia, in return for Poland's recognition of Ukrainian (UPR) independence. Petliura had thus accepted the territorial gains Poland made in the course of the Polish–Ukrainian War, when it defeated the West Ukrainian People's Republic (WUPR), a Ukrainian statehood attempt in Volhynia and Eastern Galicia. The two regions were largely Ukrainian populated but had a significant Polish minority.

On 21 April 1920, Piłsudski and a three-man Directorate of Ukraine, led by Petliura, agreed to the Treaty of Warsaw. The treaty has been known as the Petliura–Piłsudski Pact, but it was signed by Polish Deputy Foreign Minister Jan Dąbski and Livytskyi. The text of the agreement was kept secret and it was not ratified by the Polish Sejm. In exchange for agreeing to a border along the Zbruch River, Petliura was promised military help in regaining Soviet-controlled Ukrainian territories, including Kiev. He would then reassume the authority of the Ukrainian People's Republic.

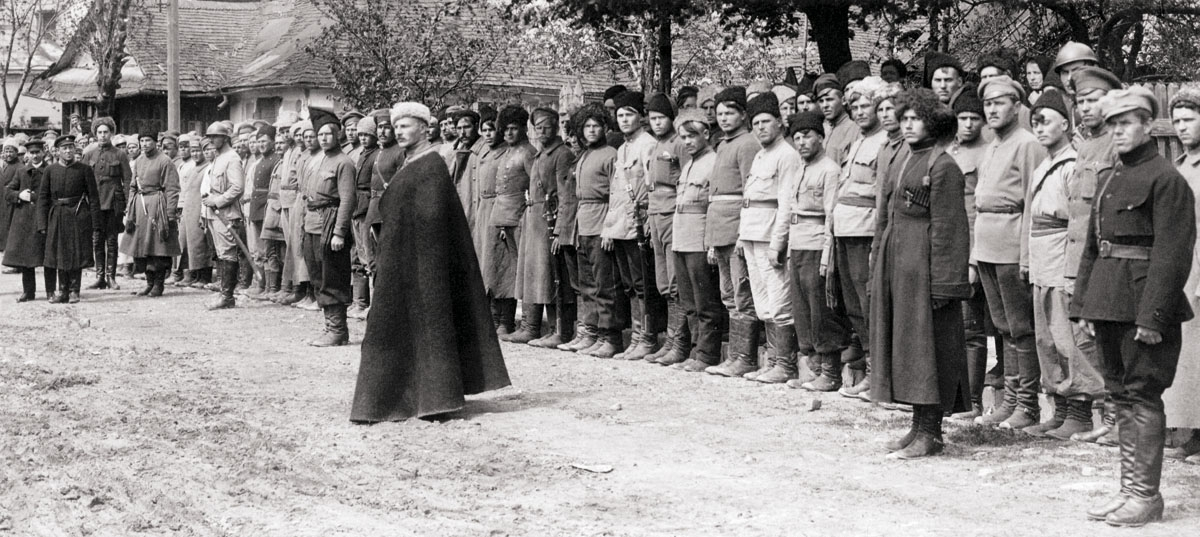
Petliura (on the left) inspecting Ukrainian troops in Kiev in May 1920; General Ivan Omelianowicz-Pavlenko in the middle

A military convention regarding common action and subordination of Ukrainian units to Polish command was signed by the Ukrainian and Polish sides on 24 April. On 25 April, the Polish and the UPR forces began an offensive aimed at Kiev.

A preliminary trade agreement was arrived at on 1 May by the Polish and Ukrainian sides. It foresaw extensive exploitation of Ukraine by the Polish state and capital. The signing of the agreement would reveal its content, with likely catastrophic consequences for Petliura, so it had not been signed.

Factions in the Polish parliament, most prominently the National Democrats, protested Piłsudski's alliance with Petliura's Ukraine, his slighting of the Polish government, and the policies of fait accompli. They felt that all major Polish moves should have been consulted with the Allies. The National Democrats did not recognize Ukrainians as a nation and to them the Ukrainian issue reduced to a proper division of Ukraine between Poland and White (or Red) Russia.

The UPR was not recognized by the Allies. The British and the French warned Poland that the treaty with the UPR amounted to irresponsible adventurism, because Poland lacked strong economic foundations, industry, or stable finances, and was not in a position to impose a new geostrategic situation in Europe.

The UPR was supposed to subordinate its military and economy to Warsaw. Ukraine was going to join the Polish-led Intermarium federation of states in central and eastern Europe. Piłsudski wanted a Poland-allied Ukraine to be a buffer between Poland and Russia. Provisions in the treaty guaranteed the rights of the Polish and Ukrainian minorities within each state and obliged each side not to conclude international agreements against each other. Piłsudski also needed an alliance with a Ukrainian faction as cover for the action perceived abroad as military aggression.

As the treaty legitimized Polish control over the territory that Ukrainians viewed as rightfully theirs, the alliance received a dire reception from many Ukrainian leaders, ranging from Mykhailo Hrushevsky, former chairman of the Central Council of Ukraine, to Yevhen Petrushevych, the leader of the West Ukrainian People's Republic who was forced into exile after the Polish–Ukrainian War. UPR Prime Minister Isaak Mazepa resigned his position in protest of the Warsaw agreements. While to many protesting WUPR activists Petliura was a traitor and renegade, the divided UPR circles quarreled about the merits of the Polish–Ukrainian alliance.

== Preparations ==
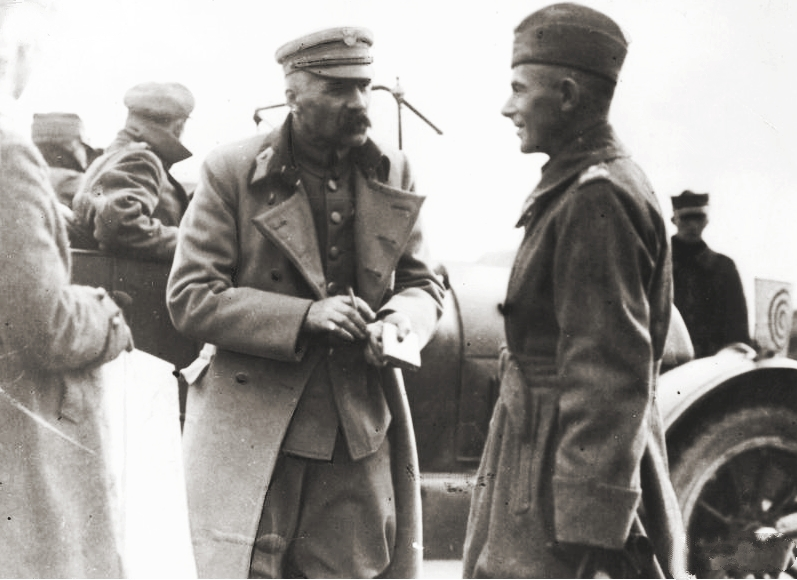
Polish Chief of State Józef Piłsudski (left) and Edward Rydz-Śmigły in 1920

Piłsudski resolved to realize his political objectives by way of military determinations. For political reasons, he chose to launch an attack on the southern, Ukrainian front, in the direction of Kiev. He had been assembling a large military force throughout the winter. He had become convinced that the Russian White movement and its forces, largely defeated by the Red Army, were no longer a security threat to Poland and that he could take on the remaining adversary, the Bolsheviks.

The Red Army, which had been regrouping since 10 March, was not fully ready for combat. One important factor that limited the Soviet response to the Polish attack was the peasant Pitchfork uprising that took place in February–March and was taken very seriously by the Bolshevik leadership. It distracted the Soviet Commissar of War Leon Trotsky so much that he had temporarily left Ukraine and Belarus poorly defended.

The Kiev Expedition, in which 65,000 Polish and 15,000 Ukrainian soldiers took part, commenced on 25 April 1920. It was carried out by the southern group of Polish armies, under Piłsudski's command. The operation was prepared and carried out by Piłsudski and his allies, Piłsudski's trusted officers with the Polish Legions backgrounds. Major generals on the General Staff were kept in the dark about the emerging details of the offensive. Piłsudski was convinced that the Soviets did not have major military forces at their disposal and that the Ukrainian population would generally support the Polish-led effort.

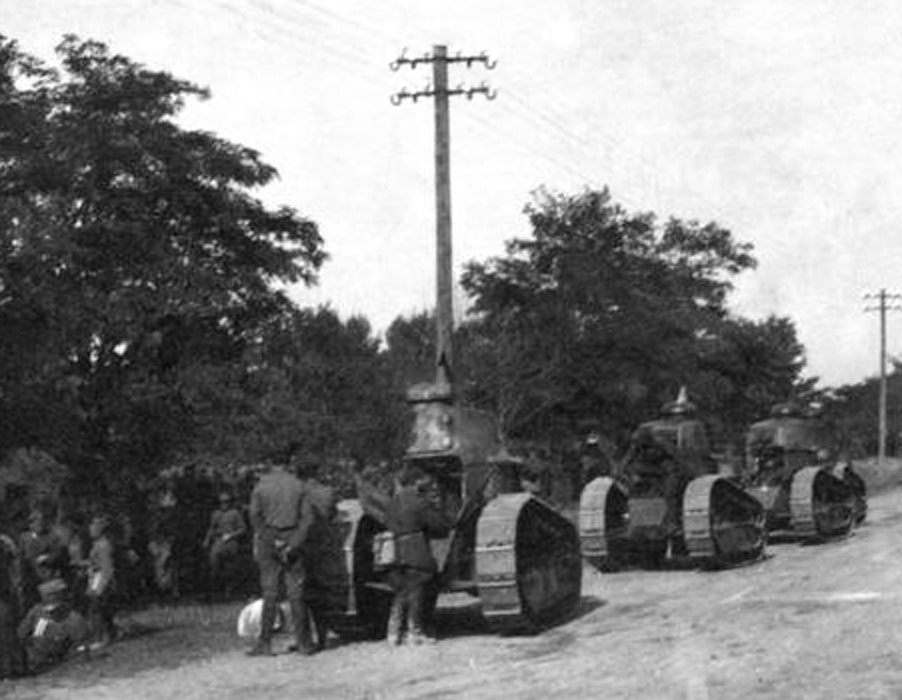
Column of Polish FT-17 tanks near Lviv, c. 1919

An intense war propaganda effort had been unleashed to prepare Polish society and the armed forces. On the one hand, the Red Army was presented as exceptionally feeble and led by incompetent commanders, a dispirited and harmless formation. The weakness of the enemy had supposedly offered a unique opportunity for Poland, one that should not be missed, especially given the exceptional abilities of Commander-in-chief Piłsudski and the strength and fitness of the Polish Army. On the other, the Bolsheviks were described as a threatening menace, capable of and getting ready for an offensive on massive scale. The skirmishes that had taken place were portrayed as bloody and fiercely fought battles, harbingers of that assault. An angry reaction from the Allies, opposed to the escalation of the conflict, was expected.

On 27 March, the Sejm militarized the railroads. On 14 April, General Sosnkowski ordered cadets in military schools to report for frontline duty. On 17 April, Piłsudski ordered his forces to assume attack positions. Foreign Minister Stanisław Patek headed for Western Europe to explain to the Allies the rationale behind the offensive Poland undertook and to seek new shipments of military supplies. Marshal Piłsudski led the military operation in person.

Because of the preparations for a major military offensive, the Polish Armed Forces (about 800,000 soldiers, a majority of whom were on the Polish eastern fronts) had been reorganized as of 1 April. Seven armies had been established by 6 August. The 3rd Army, Piłsudski' favorite, was placed under Edward Rydz-Śmigły on 19 April. It was designated to execute the Kiev operation, patterned after the taking of Vilnius in the north in April 1919. Another success of a "legionnaire" formation was going to further strengthen the dominant role of the Polish Legions former members and of their chief Piłsudski in the Polish Armed Forces.

60,000 Polish and 4,000 Ukrainian soldiers took part in the initial invasion. The well-equipped Polish 3rd Army was supposed to split the enemy forces into two parts. Speed and maneuverability of the advancing units were emphasized. On 25 April, the day the offensive began, an official communique was issued. The Polish side claimed that the attack was a response to numerous Soviet infringements and was intended to thwart the offensive the enemy had planned.

Piłsudski's forces were divided into three armies. Arranged from north to south, they were the 3rd, 2nd and 6th, with Petliura's forces attached to the 6th Army. Facing them were the Soviet 12th and 14th Armies led by Alexander Yegorov.

Yegorov commanded the forces of the Soviet Southwestern Front. They were weak and poorly equipped. On its western fronts, the Red Army aimed for full military readiness in July 1920. In late April there, its troops were no match for the Polish forces. Piłsudski wanted to believe that the enemy would defend Kiev and a decisive battle would be fought on the city's outskirts, but that was not to be the case. For the most part, Yegorov's units refrained from challenging Piłsudski's armies and withdrew.

== Battle ==
=== Polish advance ===
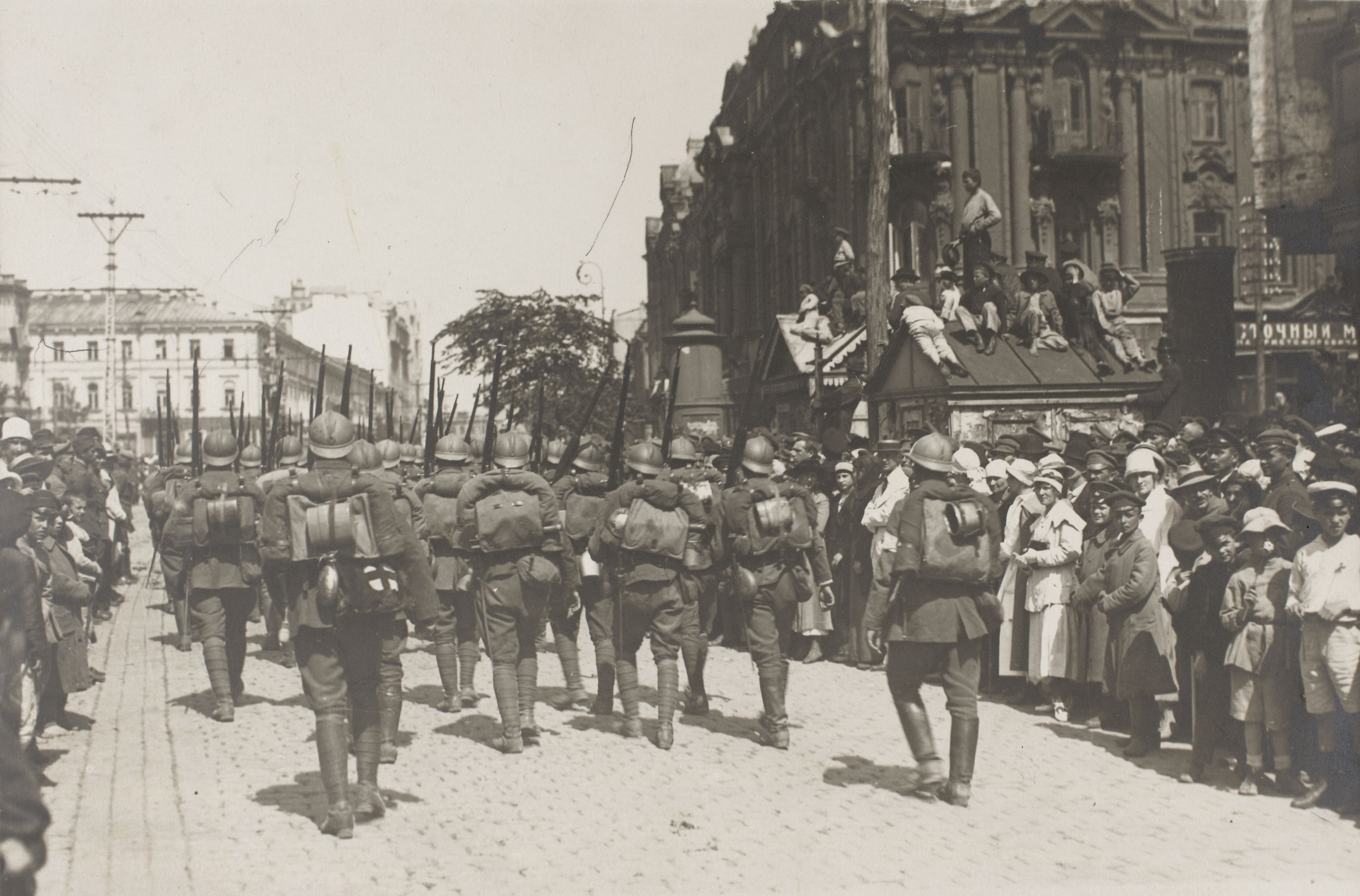
Polish soldiers in Kiev in May 1920

The Polish advantage on the southern Ukrainian front caused a quick defeat of the Soviet armies and their displacement past the Dnieper River. Zhytomyr was captured on 26 April. Lieutenant Tadeusz Bór-Komorowski was among the Polish cavalry men recognized for valour. Planes of the Polish Air Force caused panic in the enemy ranks. In a 26 April letter to Prime Minister Leopold Skulski, Piłsudski characterized the Bolshevik formations as "almost incapable of any resistance", strongly impressed by the extraordinary speed of Polish moves. Contrary to the Polish expectations, many towns had been taken without any opposition from the Red Army, whose units were quickly withdrawn by their commanders. Within a week, the Soviet 12th Army had become disorganized. The Polish 6th Army and Petliura's forces pushed the Soviet 14th Army out of central Ukraine as they quickly marched eastward through Vinnytsia. In Vinnytsia, from 13 May, Petliura organized his government and prepared further offensive in the direction of Odessa.

The Soviet 12th Army evacuated from Kiev on 6 May. "Those beasts", wrote Piłsudski to General Sosnkowski on 6 May, "instead of defending Kiev, flee from there". The Polish offensive stopped at Kiev and the front was formed along the Dnieper. The combined Polish-Ukrainian forces under General Rydz-Śmigły entered the city on 7 May. A bridgehead was established and reached 15 kilometers east of the Dnieper, which was as far as the Polish 3rd Army advanced. About 20,000 Red Army troops had been taken prisoner by 2 May. Only 150 Polish soldiers died during the entire operation.

On 9 May, the Polish and Ukrainian troops celebrated the capture of Kiev with the victory parade on Khreshchatyk, the city's main street. Control over Kiev was given to the Ukrainian People's Republic and the Ukrainian 6th Division was garrisoned there. However, the military achievement turned out to be incomplete, as the Bolshevik armies, contrary to Polish objectives, avoided decisive confrontations and had not been destroyed. While the Polish forces had been drawn deeply into the Ukrainian territory, the Soviets could not be made to participate in forced negotiations, as the Polish side had hoped. The Polish command soon felt compelled to transfer some of its units to the northern Belarusian front.

On 1 May, in a letter to his wife, Piłsudski declared a victory:

"With the first stage completed, you must now be very surprised and a little scared by these great successes. In the meantime, I prepare for the second phase and arrange the forces and materials so it can be as effective as the first one. So far, I had completely destroyed the entire Bolshevik 12th Army, of which nothing at all had been left ... one feels dizzy thinking of the amount of war materials captured ... I had won this great battle by a daring plan and extraordinary energy put into its execution."

The triumphant tone turned out to be premature. The 12th Army, in particular, had been battered but not destroyed, as the marshal was soon to find out.

The military and political developments elicited a sharp response in Russia, where Vladimir Lenin and Leon Trotsky appealed to national sentiments and called for total war with expansionist Poland. General Aleksei Brusilov, former chief commander of the Russian Empire's Tsarist army and from 2 May chairman of the new Council of Military Experts, appealed to his former officers to re-enlist with the Bolshevik forces and 40,000 of them complied. A large army of volunteers had also been raised and sent to the Western Front; the first units departed Moscow on 6 May.

The Soviet leaders considered the Polish attack in Ukraine a stroke of good fortune. They saw Poland as falling into its own trap and expected a military victory for Russia. Moscow had masterfully unleashed psychological warfare in Soviet Russia, Poland, and Europe. A new Great Patriotic War was declared and Russian society mobilized accordingly. For the Russian and Soviet publicists, the Kiev Expedition had become synonymous with the Polish politics of aggression and political thoughtlessness. The negative image of Poland they had created was exploited by the Soviet Union in the following years, most importantly in September 1939 and during World War II.

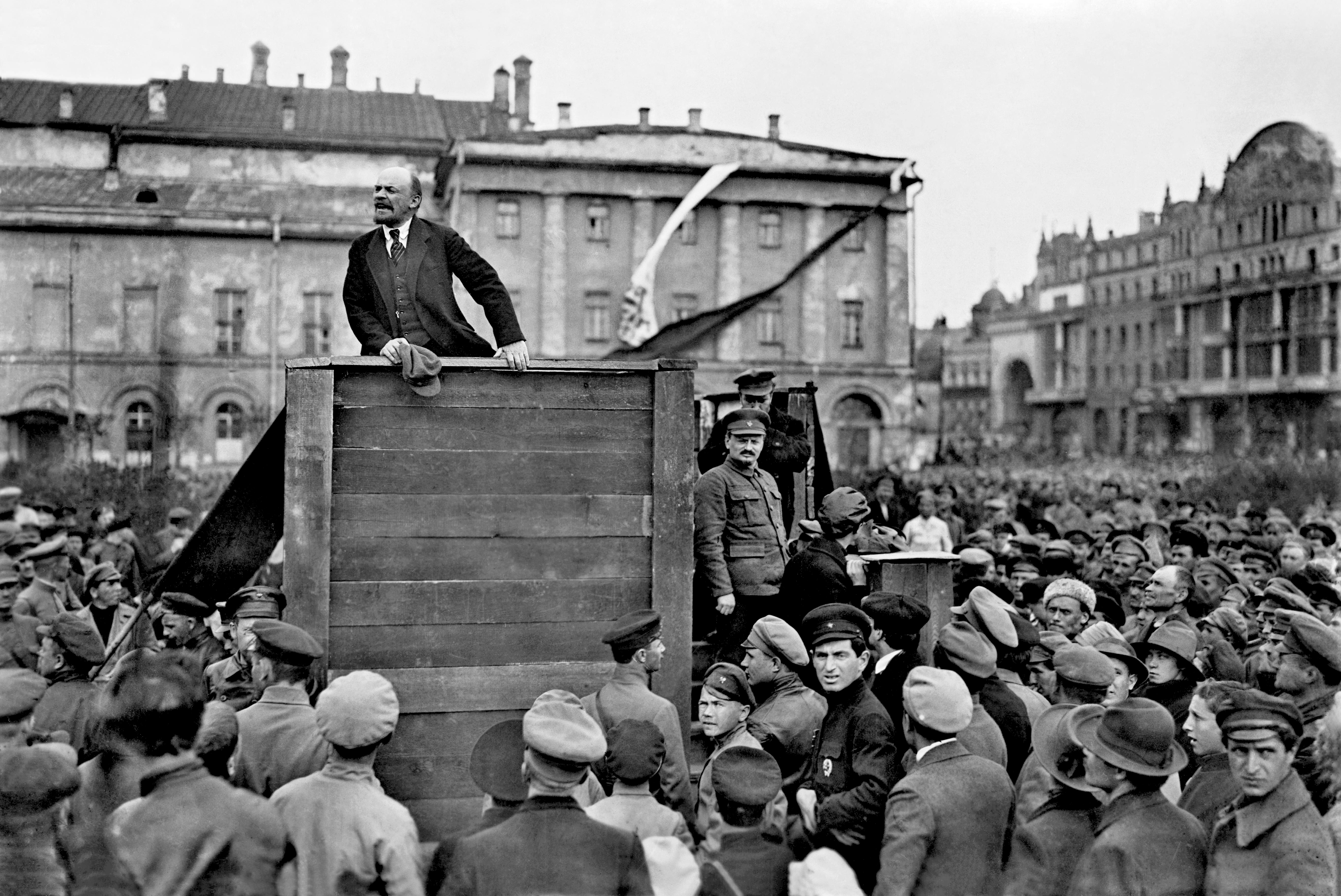
Vladimir Lenin, Chairman of the Council of People's Commissars of the Russian SFSR, delivers a speech to motivate the troops to fight in the Soviet–Polish war, 1 May 1920

What appeared to be a highly successful military expedition to a city that symbolized the eastern reaches of Polish history (harking back to the intervention of Bolesław I the Brave in 1018) caused enormous euphoria in Poland. The Polish Sejm declared the need to establish such "strategic borders" that would make a future war improbable already on 4 May. Piłsudski was lionized by the public and by politicians of different orientations. On 18 May in Warsaw, he was greeted in the Sejm by its Marshal Wojciech Trąmpczyński, who spoke of a tremendous triumph of Polish arms and said to Piłsudski: "The victories of our army accomplished under your leadership will influence the future in our east". "I left Warsaw that was intoxicated by the triumph; the nation had lost its sense of reality" – commented Charles de Gaulle.

On 26 April in Zhytomyr, in his "Call to the People of Ukraine", Piłsudski assured that "the Polish Army would only stay as long as necessary until a legal Ukrainian government took control over its own territory". Many Ukrainians were both anti-Polish and anti-Bolshevik, and were suspicious of the advancing Poles. The Command of the Polish Army Rear in Ukraine had just been established to help with the supply of the Polish Army. From 12 May, a newly established Polish military authority had been engaged in requisitioning goods from the Ukrainian population, giving rise to protests lodged by Ukrainian officials. Among the machinery and products confiscated from Ukraine were thousands of loaded cars, engines and railroad equipment, in violation of the Polish–Ukrainian accords. Because of the changing military situation, such activities had taken place over a limited period of time. The Soviet propaganda had the effect of encouraging negative Ukrainian sentiment towards the Polish operation and Polish-Ukrainian relations in general. Actions such as punitive military expeditions organized by Polish land owners against rebellious Ukrainian peasants strengthened the effectiveness of Bolshevik propaganda.

The Polish command restricted administrative districts in Ukraine where Petliura's army was allowed to conduct recruitment campaigns. Polish officials claimed that Ukrainian candidates for the military were demoralized, would cause trouble and be of little use. A (small) Ukrainian army was supposed to only symbolize the Polish–Ukrainian alliance; the victory was intended to belong to Poland alone. A strong, victorious Ukrainian army might have demanded revisions in the treaties and reopen border disputes. A modest in size and capabilities UPR, a Poland-dependent "buffer" state, would guarantee loyalty and solidarity with Polish politics. Polish soldiers in Ukraine often acted as an occupation force. According to Polish General Leon Berbecki, "the orgy of plunder" ... "lasted for several weeks". Piłsudski and other Polish commanders had been instrumental in their treatment of Petliura and the leading Ukrainian officers.

The Ukrainian population was tired of hostilities after several years of war. Nationality-conscious Ukrainians often thought of Petliura as the man who sold out Ukraine to Poland. Efforts to generate Ukrainian popular support for the idea of the country's alliance with Poland had failed. The growth of Petliura's Ukrainian forces was slow: there were about 23,000 soldiers in September 1920.

Petliura wanted the Polish forces to remain in Ukraine for the time being, while the UPR engaged in the building of its statehood. Piłsudski had a different solution in mind. He planned to definitely break the Soviet armies and dictate his peace conditions to Red Russia by 10 May. Then the Polish military would begin its evacuation. However, instead of negotiating, the enemy prepared for a counteroffensive. The Polish command knew only that the Southwestern Front forces east of the Dnieper were being systematically reinforced. Józef Jaklicz, chief-of-staff of the 15th Infantry Division, wrote to his wife on 30 May: "We have overestimated our strength and threw ourselves into politics on a grand scale, with the military engaged, without being properly secured ... The soldiers are cut-off from the world, there is no news or communication." Polish soldiers feared the hostility of Ukrainian rural population.

=== Soviet counterattack ===
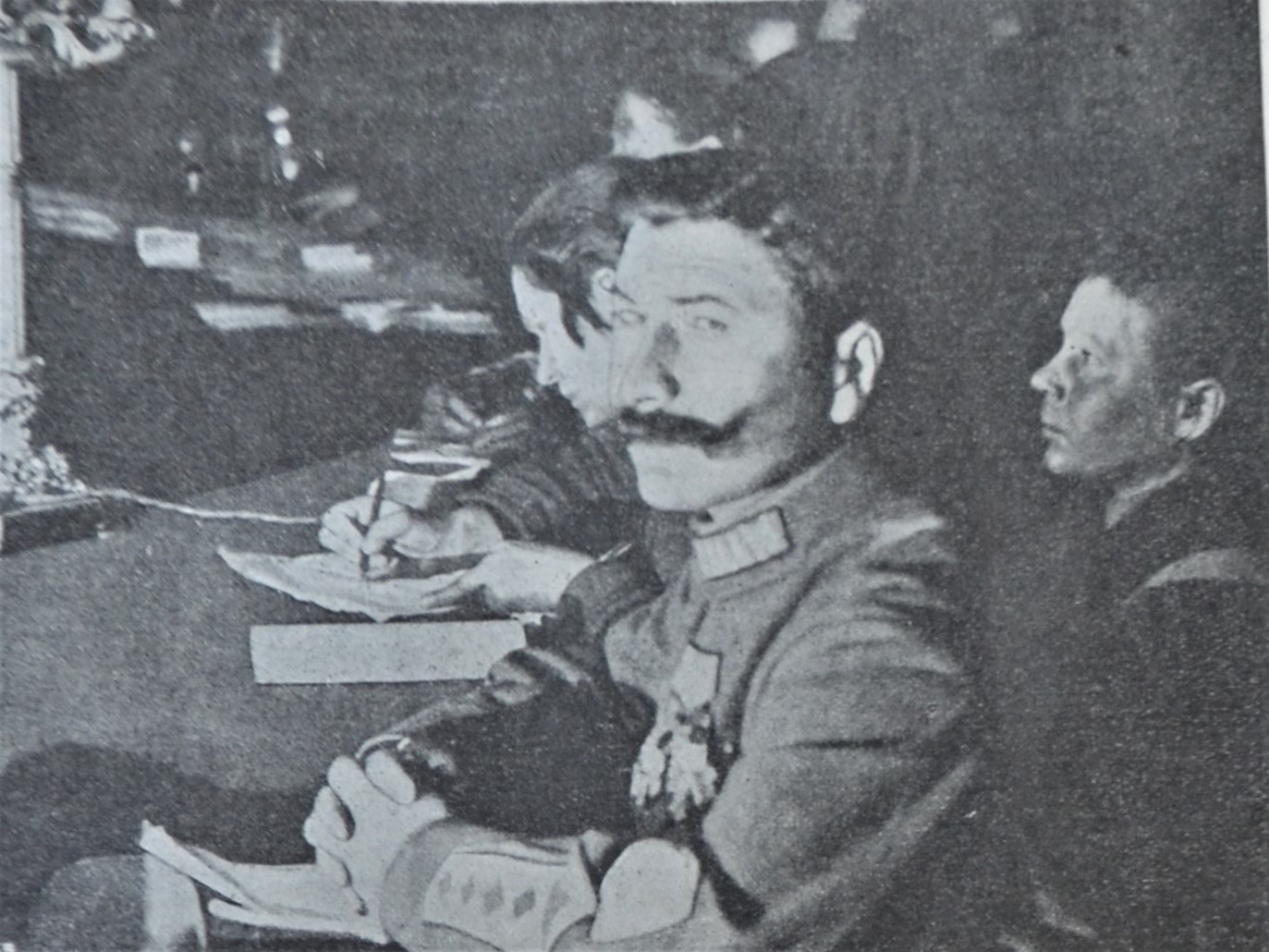
Semyon Budyonny

The Polish forces were uniformly and thinly stretched along Poland's eastern front that was 1200 km long. They were reinforced by some World War I trenches. At some locations, considered strategically important, concentrations of troops were established, but they would be easy to go around. French General Paul Prosper Henrys, who visited the front, noted the weakness of Polish rear reserves. He suggested that the ratio of frontline troops to the reserves should be 2:1, not 5:1, as was the case.

Scheme of the Soviet counteroffensive

According to the concept of Boris Shaposhnikov, chief operations manager on the Field Staff of the Revolutionary Military Council, the Soviet leadership decided to concentrate forces in Belarus and launch a counteroffensive from there. The Polish challenge in Ukraine necessitated a Soviet response. Trotsky arrived at Mogilev to personally motivate Russian troops to avenge the Polish insult. He predicted the Red Army's presence in Warsaw in the near future. On 14 May, Trotsky ordered the Red Army to attack.

Mikhail Tukhachevsky, accomplished in fighting the Whites, was made commander of the Western Front on 1 May 1920. He wanted to launch an assault on the Belarusian front before Polish troops arrived from the Ukrainian front. On 14 May, Tukhachevsky's so-called first offensive began. Western Front's 15th and 16th Armies attacked the slightly weaker Polish forces (the combatants had respectively 75,000 and 72,000 combined infantry and cavalry soldiers at their disposal) and penetrated the Polish-held areas to the depth of one hundred kilometers. The transfer of two Polish divisions from the Ukrainian front had to be expedited and the newly formed Polish Reserve Army (32,000 men) was used after 25 May. Because of the energetic Polish counter-offensive led by Stanisław Szeptycki, Kazimierz Sosnkowski and Leonard Skierski, by 8 June the Poles had recovered the bulk of the lost territory, Tukhachevsky's armies were withdrawn to the Avuta and Berezina Rivers, and the front had remained inactive until July. While Tukhachevsky retained control of the strategic points needed for future offensive action, the Polish high command kept its ineffective system of linear arrangement of forces and weak rear reserves.

The Soviet forces south of Polesia were also getting ready for a counterassault. On 5 May, Felix Dzerzhinsky arrived in Kharkiv and brought with him 1,400 Cheka functionaries, charged with improving discipline in Red Army units. The plan for the counteroffensive in the south was approved during a 15 May conference in which Sergey Kamenev also participated. Because the 12th and the 14th Armies of the Southwestern Front still did not have sufficient resources to launch an attack, the participants decided to wait for the arrival of the 1st Cavalry Army under Semyon Budyonny, which was on its way (from 10 March) to the Polish–Soviet combat area. The 1st Cavalry Army, a highly regarded formation credited with the destruction of the "White" Volunteer Army, was assigned by Kamenev and Dzerzhinsky the leading role in attacking the Polish armies in Ukraine. On 1 May, the 1st Cavalry Army was over 40,000 men (and women) strong, but only 18,000 of its soldiers were brought to bear on the Polish front.

To better prepare for the expected Soviet counteroffensive, the Ukrainian Front, a new Polish formation, was established on 28 May. It comprised 57,000 soldiers and was charged with holding onto the territory that Polish forces had acquired. Polish (and Allied) commanders held Soviet cavalry in low regard. To Piłsudski, Budyonny's horse people were like bands of nomads or swarms of locusts (a reference to their propensity to wreak havoc on civilian communities encountered), incapable of executing any effective cavalry charge.

Alexander Yegorov, commander of the Russian Southwestern Front, having received considerable reinforcements, initiated on 28 May an assault maneuver in the Kiev area. Besides the Soviet main armies, the special formations of Iona Yakir and of Filipp Golikov, in addition to the 1st Cavalry Army, became especially important in attacks on the Polish positions. The 1st Cavalry Army was supposed to penetrate the Polish formations and get to their rear, while the Russian 12th and 14th Armies would complete the frontal destruction. After a week of storming the Polish defenses, on 5 June the 1st Cavalry Army forced its way between the Polish 3rd and 6th Armies. It infiltrated and disorganized the rear infrastructure of Polish lines, eliminated many smaller units, and caused extensive destruction.

Rydz-Śmigły proceeded to fortify Kiev, which he intended to defend. He refused to obey the order from the Ukrainian Front commander Antoni Listowski to withdraw in a timely manner. He demanded a written order from Piłsudski, which he received on 10 June. The Polish Army evacuation, accomplished over the next few days, was preceded by the destruction of the city's bridges, electric power stations, and water pumps on the Dnieper.

=== Polish retreat ===
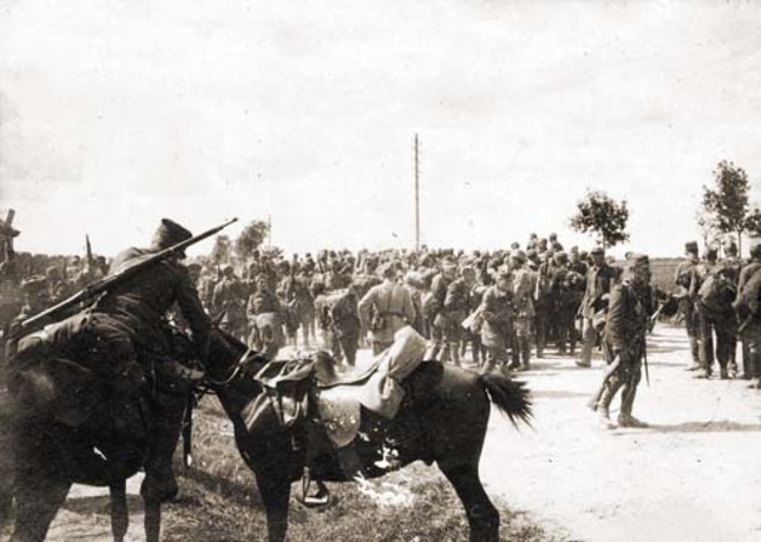
Retreat of the 3rd Polish Army from Kiev

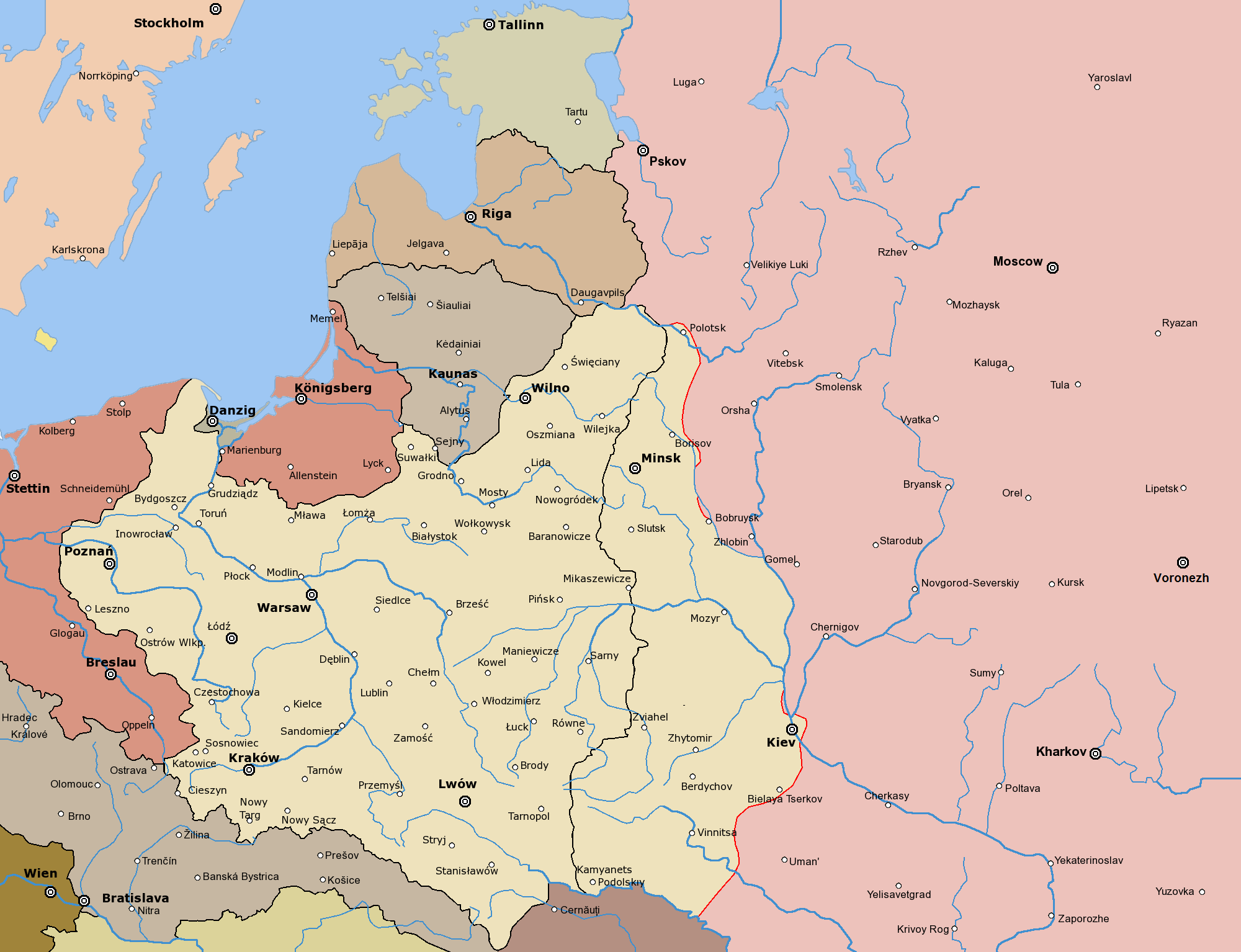
Frontline situation after the Kiev offensive in June 1920

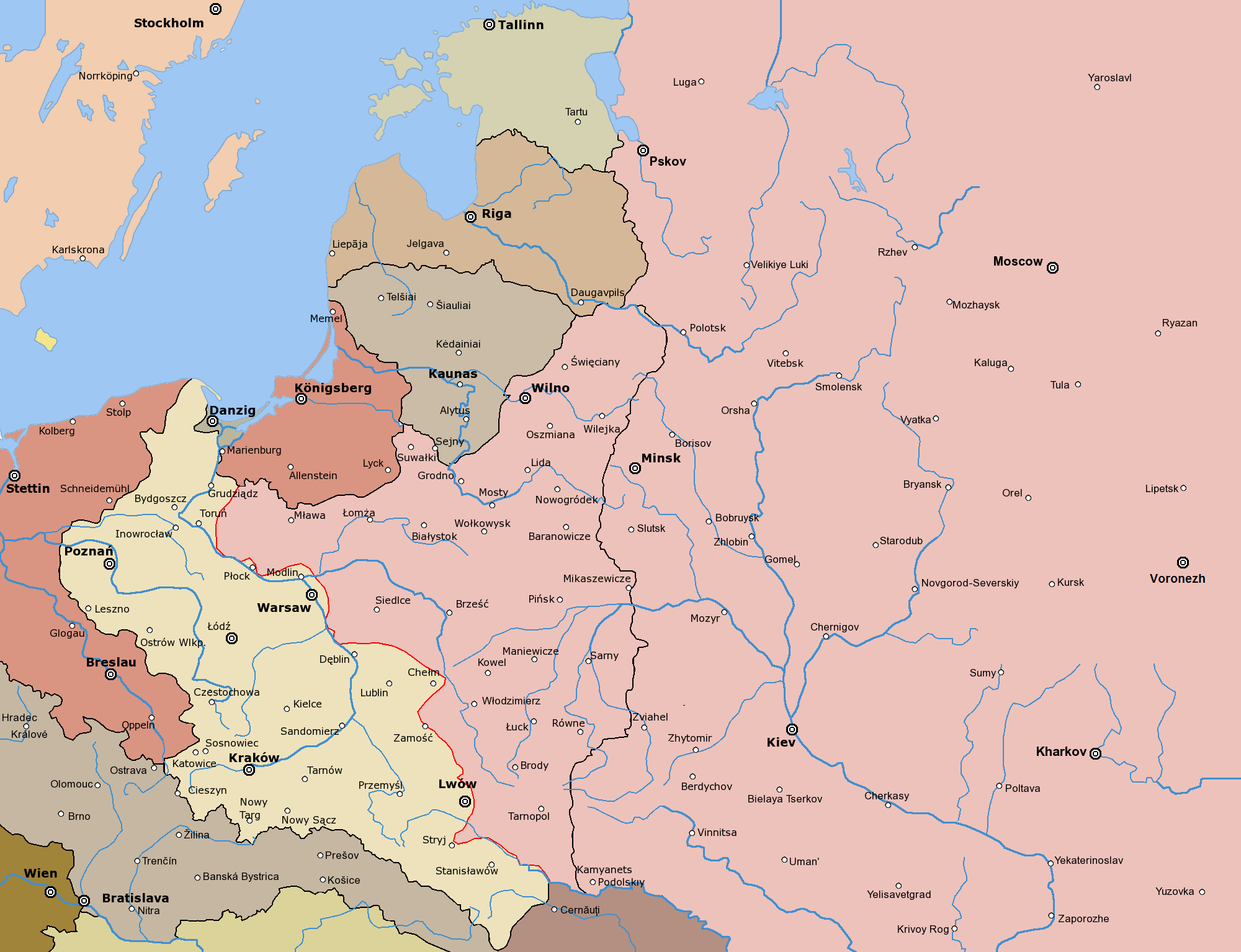
After the Soviet offensive in early August 1920

After 10 June, Rydz-Śmigły evacuated the 3rd Polish Army from Kiev. The Soviets were back, which was, supposedly, the 16th regime change in Kiev since the beginning of the Russian Revolution.

For the next two months, while fighting the Soviets, the Polish armies kept retreating toward the west. To break the encirclement, Rydz-Śmigły's 3rd Army rapidly withdrew in that direction. It took considerable military experience and ingenuity to maneuver the army, the trains of wagons full of war spoils, and fleeing civilians, out of immediate danger. The army experienced losses in life and equipment, but broke out of the entrapment by 16 June. However, contrary to Piłsudski's expectations, it was unable to launch successful counterattacks.

In the following weeks, the 2nd and 3rd Armies fought the Bolshevik forces on many occasions. Initially, the strength of their resistance and determination surprised Budyonny and his commanders. On 26 June, Rydz-Śmigły replaced Listowski as commander of the Ukrainian Front, but the Polish armies kept retreating and suffering losses. As they had lost their strategic initiative, the morale of the Polish and Ukrainian soldiers deteriorated and with time their units had become more inclined to surrender. Despite the strength of the Polish artillery formations, the officer corps in particular was subjected to heavy losses, in part due to the continued attempts to launch counterattacks.

The Polish 7th Air Escadrille, known also as the Kościuszko Squadron, manned largely by American pilots, was particularly helpful. In late May and early June, they flew many bombing and reconnaissance missions. They slowed the Soviet counteroffensive and the commandant of the Polish 13th Infantry Division commented: "Without the American pilots we would have been long gone". Their machine gun attacks held back the progress of Budyonny's cavalry. The squadron's leading pilot, Merian C. Cooper, was shot down and imprisoned by the Russians, but escaped after two months. After the 16 to 18 August intense fighting in the Lviv area, the fourteen planes of the squadron were credited again with stopping Budyonny and saving the situation.

The Polish 3rd Army withdrew to the Styr River line, the 6th Army to the Zbruch River. On 5 July, Brigadier Marian Kukiel wrote: "In the afternoon, we were hit by the unexpected order to retreat to the Zbruch. Depressing news announcing a lost war, or at least a lost campaign".

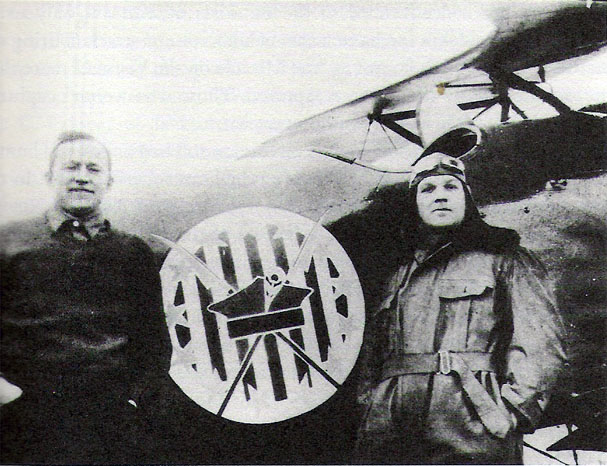
American volunteer pilots, Merian C. Cooper and Cedric Fauntleroy, fought in the Kościuszko Squadron of the Polish Air Force

On 19 July, the Poles engaged a substantial Soviet force and fought the enemy for two weeks, which culminated in the Battle of Brody and Berestechko (29 July–3 August). The offensive battle was terminated by Piłsudski, who withdrew two Polish divisions and sent them north, one to strengthen the force concentration at the Wieprz River and one to defend Warsaw. The town of Brody was kept by the Polish forces. Budyonny complained of his Cossacks being stretched to their limits and exhausted, lacking food and feed for the horses, who were too tired to fend off flies.

Ultimately, the Polish armies were forced to withdraw to their initial positions. The Russian forces also remained in western Ukraine and become involved in heavy fighting for the area of the city of Lviv, which had been under 1st Cavalry Army's siege from 12 August.

The Kiev Expedition ended with a loss of all the territories gained by the Poles and their Ukrainian allies in the course of the campaign, and also of Volhynia and parts of Eastern Galicia. However, the retreating Polish forces avoided destruction by the Soviet armies.

== Aftermath ==
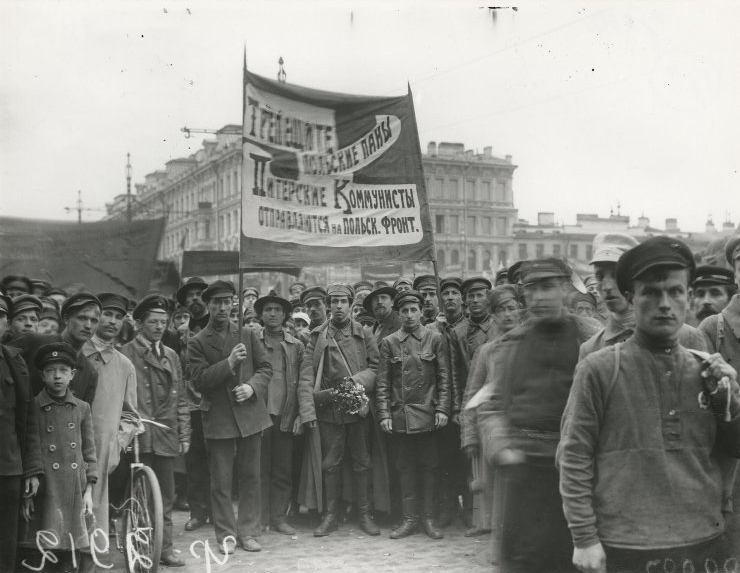
Russian volunteers about to be sent to the Polish front

In the aftermath of the defeat in Ukraine, the Polish government of Leopold Skulski resigned on 9 June, and a political crisis gripped the government for most of June. Bolshevik and later Soviet propaganda used the Kiev offensive to portray the Polish government as imperialist aggressors.

The Kiev Expedition's defeat dealt a severe blow to Piłsudski's plans for the Intermarium federation, which had never materialized. From that perspective, the operation may be viewed as a defeat for Piłsudski, as well as for Petliura.

On 4 July, the second, better prepared and stronger northern offensive was launched in Belarus by Russian armies led by Tukhachevsky. Its aim was to capture Warsaw as quickly as possible. The Soviet forces reached the vicinity of the Polish capital in the first half of August.

In Polish politics, Piłsudski had never recovered from his Kiev Expedition debacle. In 1926, he perpetrated a bloody coup.

The historian Andrzej Chwalba summarized some of the losses of the Polish state caused "mainly by the Kiev Expedition":

– The international standing of the Second Polish Republic was stronger before the offensive than a year later. Poland had barely overcome a threat to its existence.

– In July 1920, the Western Allies designated three-fourths of the territory of the former Duchy of Teschen as part of Czechoslovakia. This led to the Polish armed annexation of the Trans-Olza region in 1938 and to the general perception of Poland as an aggressive power and ally of Nazi Germany.

– The 1920 East Prussian plebiscite took place in July 1920, an unfortunate time for the Polish plebiscite campaign. The magnitude of the plebiscite loss negatively affected Poland's future border with Germany. Further war in the east hurt also Polish propaganda efforts in Upper Silesia, which was acknowledged by Wojciech Korfanty and other Polish activists.

– Had it not been for the Kiev Expedition, Poland would have likely retained its administration of the Vilnius region, the Piłsudski-ordered Żeligowski's Mutiny and the takeover of Vilnius would not have taken place and the Polish–Lithuanian relations would not be as bad as they ended up being.

– Poland's reputation had suffered as the country's policies in the east were seen as irresponsible and adventurous by historians and publicists outside of Poland. The efforts of their Polish counterparts to alter the image of Poland as an aggressor have not been successful.

In 1920, hundreds of thousands of lives may have been lost. Poland ended up with reduced territory it controlled and the country's condition in international politics was weaker than before the war.

== Accusations of misconduct ==
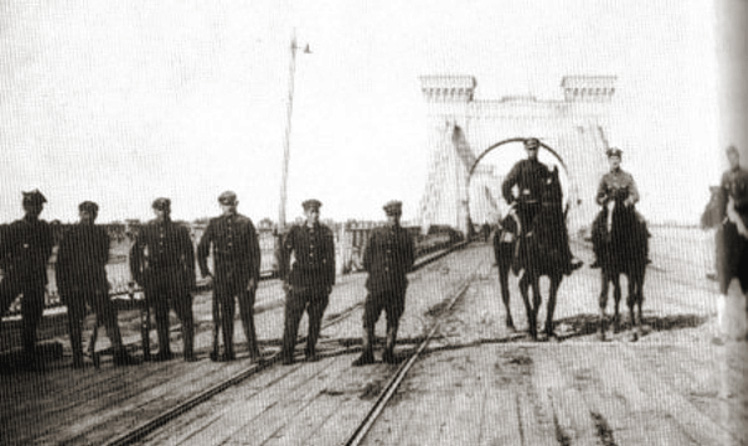
Polish soldiers on the Nicholas Chain Bridge in Kiev. This and other bridges were destroyed during the Polish withdrawal from the city.

Both parties of the conflict made mutual accusations of violations of the basic rules of war conduct. They were rampant and full of exaggerations. Norman Davies wrote that "Polish and Soviet newspapers of that time competed in which could produce a more terrifying portrait of their opponent."

According to Ukrainian General Yuriy Tyutyunnyk, (following the Polish invasion of Ukraine) "train after train sped out of Ukraine, taking out sugar, flour, grain, cattle, horses, and all the other riches of Ukraine". Tyutyunnyk was referring to the appropriations ordered by Piłsudski and other Polish commanders.

A breakdown in law and order ensued from the Polish takeover of Kiev on 7 May. Kiev's new conquerors looted the city and its residents, as did the marauding remnants of the Russian forces. Polish officers were empowered to shoot the burglars, but piles of stolen goods waiting to be loaded could be seen at the main train station. The Bolsheviks, leaving the city, took with them their political prisoners and many people recently arrested by the Cheka, including numerous Poles.

The Poles have been accused of destroying much of Kiev's infrastructure, including the passenger and cargo railway stations and other purely civilian objects crucial for the city's functioning, such as the electric power stations, the city sewerage and water supply systems, as well as its monuments. The Poles denied that they had committed any such acts of vandalism, claiming that the only deliberate damage they carried out during their evacuation was blowing up the bridges in Kiev across the Dnieper River, for military reasons. According to some Ukrainian sources, other instances of destruction in the city had also occurred. Among the destroyed objects were the mansion of the general-governor of Kiev at Institutskaya street, and the monument to Taras Shevchenko, recently erected on the former location of the monument to Olga of Kiev.

Richard Watt wrote that the Soviet advance into Ukraine was characterized by mass killing of civilians and the burning of entire villages, especially by Budyonny's Cossacks; such actions were designed to instill a sense of fear in the Ukrainian population. Davies noted that on 7 June Budyonny's 1st Army destroyed the bridges in Zhytomyr, wrecked the train station and burned various buildings. On the same day it burned a hospital in Berdychiv with 600 patients and Red Cross nuns. Such terror tactics he characterized as common for Budyonny's forces.

According to Chwalba, "The news of the savagery, brutality and ruthlessness of the cavalry had a paralyzing effect and demoralized a soldier, who constantly looked back, seeking an opportunity to run away or desert. Menacing communications with such content had often been disseminated by Red Army operatives, who were aware of their debilitating effect."

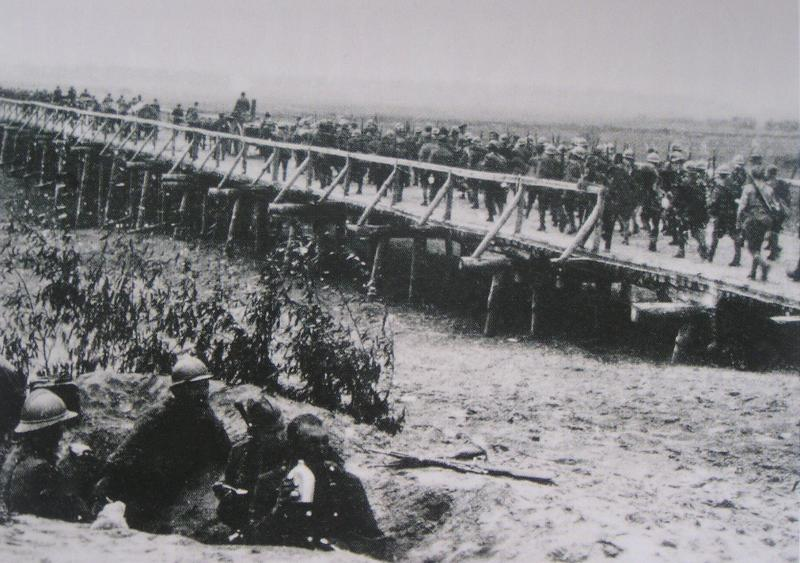
Polish troops leave Kiev

Isaac Babel, a Red Army war correspondent, wrote in his diary about atrocities committed by Polish troops and their allies, murders of Polish POWs by Red Army troops, and looting of the civilian population by Budyonny's Red Cossacks. Babel's writings became well known and Budyonny himself protested against the "defamation" of his troops.

== Order of battle ==
The following is the order of battle of Polish / UPR Ukrainian and Soviet Russian / Soviet Ukrainian forces taking part in the struggles in Ukraine, as of 25 April 1920. The command structure of both sides changed during the operation. The Russian forces were joined by Budyonny's 1st Cavalry Army in the latter part of the operation, while some of the Polish forces was withdrawn by then to Belarus.

Among the participating Polish Air Force formations was the 7th Kościuszko Squadron.

=== Poland / Ukrainian People's Republic ===
Polish Army	Unit	Polish name	Commander	Remarks
General Command of the Polish Army – Gen. Józef Piłsudski (supporting armies)
6th Army Wacław Iwaszkiewicz	5th Infantry	5 Dywizja Piechoty	Waclaw Jędrzejewski
6th Army Wacław Iwaszkiewicz	12th Infantry	12 Dywizja Piechoty	Marian Żegota-Januszajtis
6th Army Wacław Iwaszkiewicz	18th Infantry	18 Dywizja Piechoty	Franciszek Krajowski
2nd Army Antoni Listowski	13th Infantry	13 Dywizja Piechoty	Franciszek Paulik
2nd Army Antoni Listowski	15th Infantry	15 Dywizja Piechoty	Antoni Jasieński
2nd Army Antoni Listowski	6th Ukrainian	6 січова стрілецька дивізія	Marko Bezruchko
Assault Group – Józef Piłsudski
Assault Group Józef Piłsudski	4th Infantry	4 Dywizja Piechoty	Leonard Skierski
Assault Group Józef Piłsudski	Cavalry Division	Dywizja Jazdy	Jan Romer
Rybak Operational Group Józef Rybak	1st Mountain Bde	1 Brygada Górska	Stanisław Wróblewski
Rybak Operational Group Józef Rybak	7th Cavalry Bde	VII Brygada Kawalerii	Aleksander Romanowicz
Rydz-Śmigły Operational Group Edward Rydz-Śmigły	1st Legions	1 Dywizja Piechoty Legionów	Edward Rydz-Śmigły
Rydz-Śmigły Operational Group Edward Rydz-Śmigły	7th Infantry	7 Dywizja Piechoty	Eugeniusz Pogorzelski
Rydz-Śmigły Operational Group Edward Rydz-Śmigły	3rd Cavalry Bde	III Brygada Kawalerii	Jerzy Sawicki

=== Soviet Russia / Soviet Ukraine ===
Red Army	Unit	Russian name	Commander	Remarks
South-Western Front – Gen. Alexander Yegorov
12th Army Sergei Mezheninov	7th Rifle Division (RD)	7. стрелковая дивизия
12th Army Sergei Mezheninov	44th RD	44. стрелковая дивизия		transferred to the Fastov Group of Forces, May 1920
12th Army Sergei Mezheninov	45th RD	45. стрелковая дивизия		transferred to the Fastov Group of Forces, May 1920
12th Army Sergei Mezheninov	47th RD	47. стрелковая дивизия		(1st formation) merged into the 58th RD on May 3, 1920
12th Army Sergei Mezheninov	58th RD	58. стрелковая дивизия
12th Army Sergei Mezheninov	17th Cavalry Division	17. кавдивизия		dissolved in the middle of May 1920
12th Army Sergei Mezheninov	25th RD	25. стрелковая дивизия		arrived at the end of May 1920
12th Army Sergei Mezheninov	Bashkir Cavalry Brigade	Башкирская кавбригада		arrived at the end of May 1920
14th Army Ieronim Uborevich	41st RD	41. стрелковая дивизия
14th Army Ieronim Uborevich	47th RD	47. стрелковая дивизия		(2nd formation) formed on June 9, 1920
14th Army Ieronim Uborevich	60th RD	60. стрелковая дивизия
1st Cavalry Army Semyon Budyonny arrived in early June 1920	4th Cavalry Division	4. кавдивизия
1st Cavalry Army Semyon Budyonny arrived in early June 1920	6th Cavalry Division	6. кавдивизия
1st Cavalry Army Semyon Budyonny arrived in early June 1920	11th Cavalry Division	11. кавдивизия
1st Cavalry Army Semyon Budyonny arrived in early June 1920	14th Cavalry Division	14. кавдивизия
13th Army Ivan Pauka Opposite Wrangel	3rd RD	3. стрелковая дивизия
13th Army Ivan Pauka Opposite Wrangel	15th RD	15. стрелковая дивизия		arrived opposite Wrangel in May 1920
13th Army Ivan Pauka Opposite Wrangel	40th RD	40. стрелковая дивизия		arrived opposite Wrangel in June 1920
13th Army Ivan Pauka Opposite Wrangel	42nd RD	42. стрелковая дивизия		arrived opposite Wrangel in June 1920
13th Army Ivan Pauka Opposite Wrangel	46th RD	46. стрелковая дивизия
13th Army Ivan Pauka Opposite Wrangel	52nd RD	52. стрелковая дивизия
13th Army Ivan Pauka Opposite Wrangel	Latvian RD	Латышская стрелковая дивизия
13th Army Ivan Pauka Opposite Wrangel	1st Horse Corps	1. конкорпус		arrived opposite Wrangel in June 1920
13th Army Ivan Pauka Opposite Wrangel	2nd Cavalry Division	2. кавдивизия		arrived opposite Wrangel in May 1920
13th Army Ivan Pauka Opposite Wrangel	8th Cavalry Division	8. кавдивизия		transferred to the 14th Army, May 1920

== See also ==
- Battle of Kiev (1941)
- Battle of Kiev (1943)
