= Kiev Victory Parade (1920) =

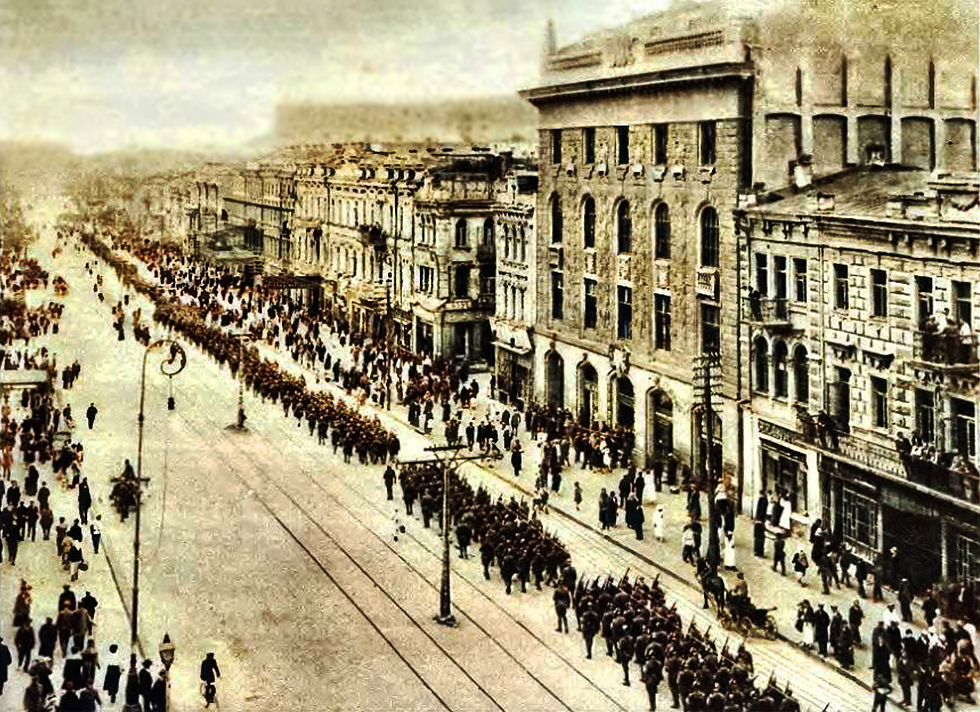
The military procession in Kiev.

The 1920 Kiev Victory Parade was a joint Polish–Ukrainian military parade on 9 May 1920 in the Ukrainian capital of Kiev. It was held on Khreshchatyk Street, after the city was captured from the Bolshevik Red Army by the allied forces of Poland and the Ukrainian People's Republic in the course of their Kiev offensive. It was the first formal military parade to be held under the auspices of the Ukrainian People's Republic.

== The parade ==
On the morning of 9 May, to the accompaniment of cannon fire from the Darnytskyi District, which marked the beginning of the military procession. Although originally, the parade was to be presided by Polish Chief of State Józef Piłsudski and Supreme Commander of the Ukrainian Army Chief Otaman Symon Petliura, certain plans for the two forced this not to happen, with the parade being commanded by General Edward Śmigły-Rydz (representing the Polish 3rd Cavalry Corps) and Colonel Marko Bezruchko (the commander of the 6th Ukrainian Infantry Division). Among other officials in attendance were representatives of the directorate of the chief of staff of the Polish Army as well as attaches from France and Japan.

The procession was as follows:

- 1st Legions Infantry Division
- 15th "Greater Poland" Infantry Division
- Heavy artillery
- 6th Ukrainian Infantry Division
- Military Band

The units marched from Prorizna Street to Duma Square (Independence Square nowadays), after which they began to march back to the starting point of the parade. Many Kievans greeted Polish liberators with flowers and loud shouts of Slava! (Glory). Following the ceremonial parade, all Polish forces in Kiev were withdrawn, to which control was given to the Ukrainian 6th Division under the control of Petliura and the Directorate of Ukraine.

== Legacy ==
In the 21st century the parade was often overshadowed against the backdrop of the Victory Day over Nazism in World War II holiday and the Victory Day Parades held on that day. On the 100th anniversary of the parade in 2020, Ukrainian and Polish journalists toured the parade route. Initially, before the COVID-19 pandemic, it was planned that the capital would host large celebrations to mark the centenary. Polish President Andrzej Duda addressed the idea of commemorating the parade with President Volodymyr Zelenskyy during the latter's visit to Auschwitz. Among others, there has also been petitions to replace the traditional 9 May holiday celebration with a commemoration of the parade, in an effort to break with the Russian holiday schedule and reduce the Russification of Ukraine. Since 2024 Ukraine commemorates World War II on May 8.

== Gallery ==
Cavalry

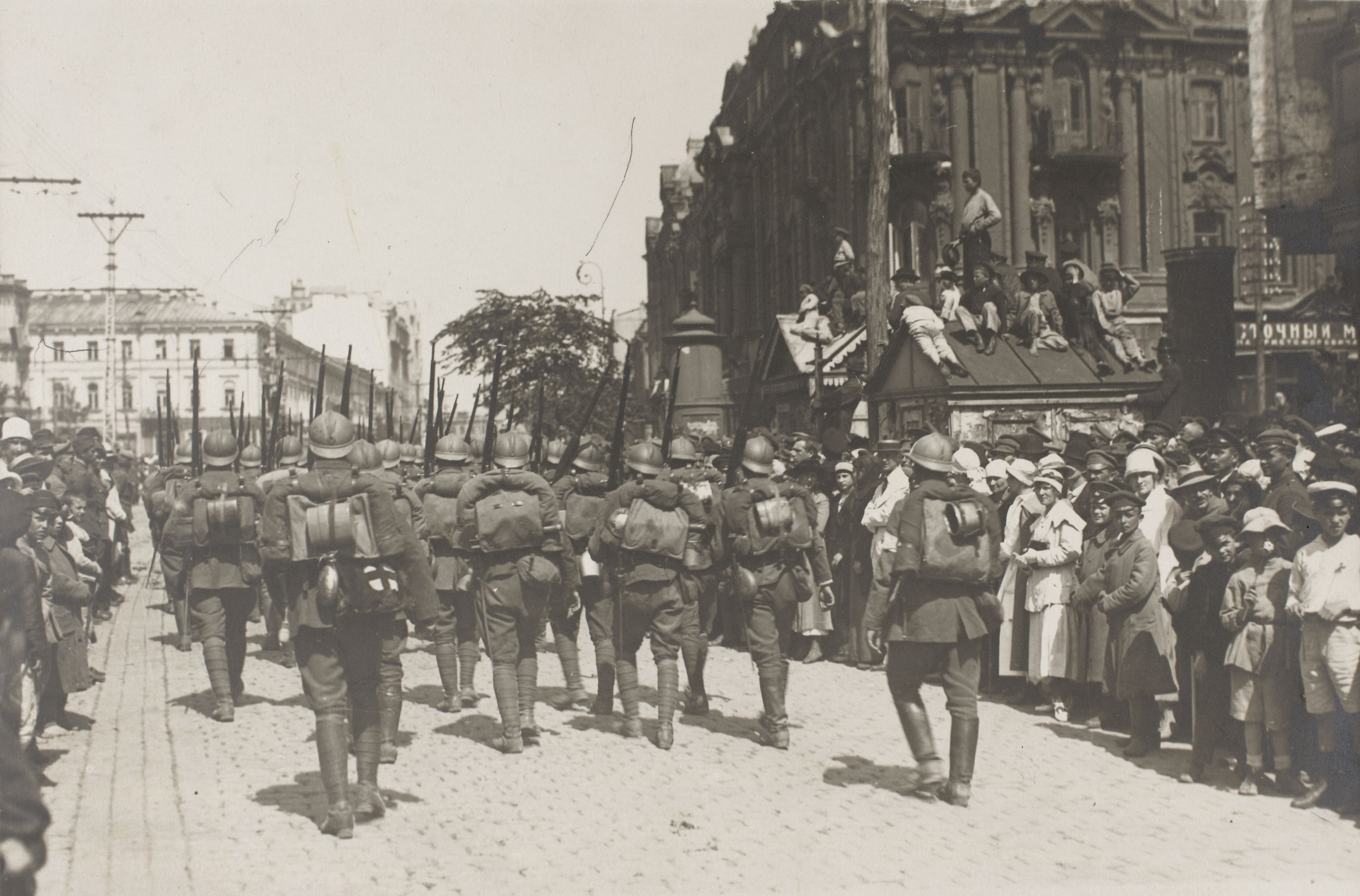
Polish infantry on Dumskaya ploshchad (currently Maidan Nezalezhnosti)

Artillery

== See also ==
- 2010 Kyiv Victory Day Parade
- Moscow Victory Parade of 1945
- Ukrainian People's Army
