= Marko Bezruchko =

Ukrainian general (1883–1944)

Marko Bezruchko

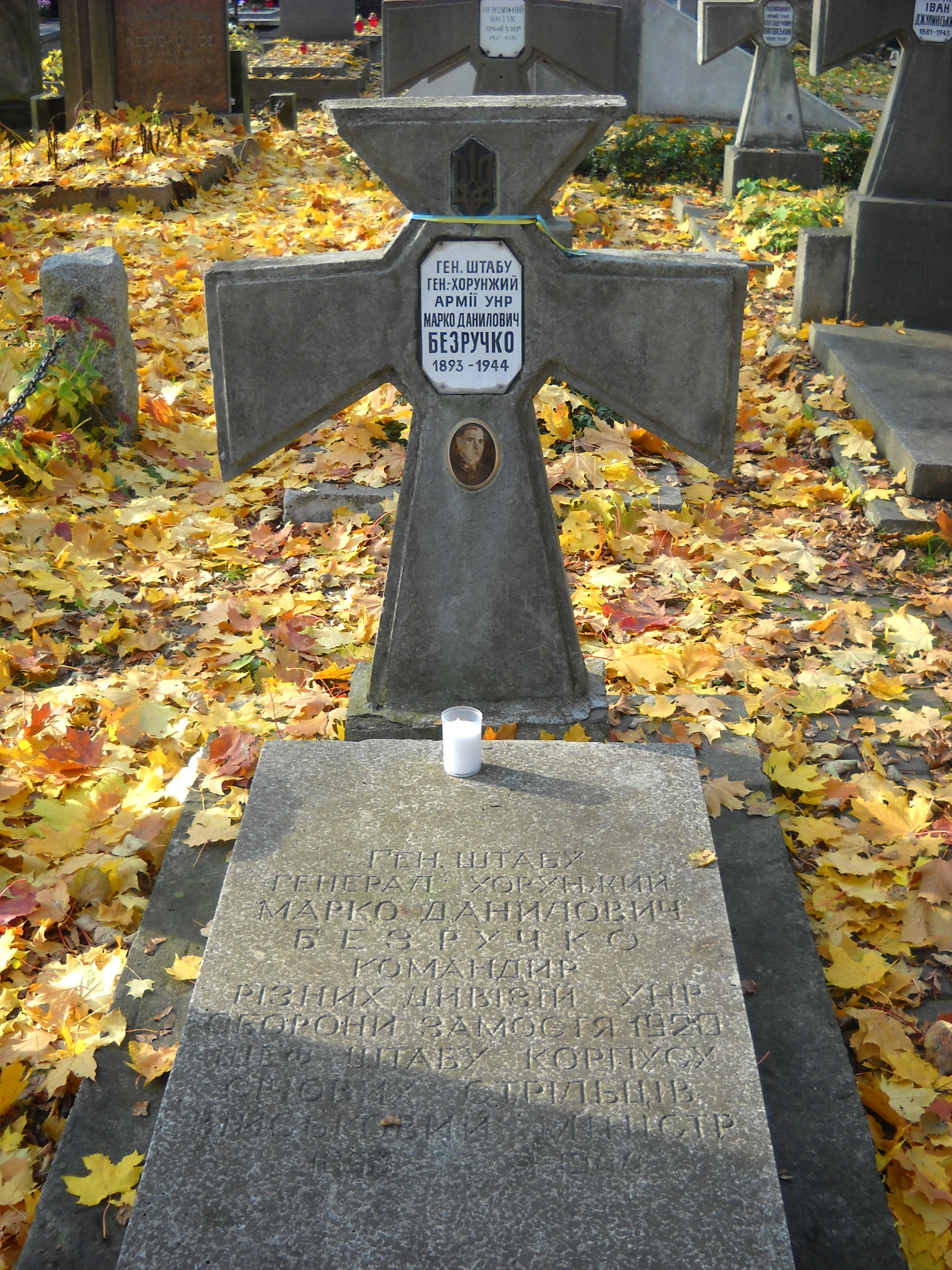
Bezruchko's grave at the Orthodox Cemetery in Warsaw

Marko Danylovych Bezruchko (Ukrainian: Марко Данилович Безручко; 1883–1944) was a Ukrainian military commander and a General of the Ukrainian People's Republic.

Bezruchko was born in 1883 in Velikiy Tokmak, Taurida Governorate. In 1912 he enrolled in the Russian Nikolai Academy of General Staff in Saint Petersburg. Later numerous graduates of the Academy joined the Ukrainian People's Army such as Mykola Yunakiv. During World War I he served in the Russian army. After the revolution in Russia he returned to Ukraine, where in 1918 he joined the armed forces of the Ukrainian People's Republic (UNR).

In 1918 as an officer of the General Staff he was the commander of the 1st Unit of the Army of UNR. In 1919 he became the chief of staff of the Independent Corps of Sich Riflemen. In 1920, after UNR leader Symon Petliura's alliance with Poland, he became the commanding officer of the regiment-sized Ukrainian 6th Sich Rifle Infantry Division of the 2nd Polish Army under General Antoni Listowski. He commanded the unit in the April-June 1920 Kyiv offensive of the Polish Army. Bezruchko led the defense during a Bolshevik offensive against Zamość in August-September 1920.

Between 1921 and 1924 he was also a member of the Highest Military Council of the government of UNR in exile in Poland. After the Peace of Riga he remained in Warsaw, where he died in 1944.

Bezruchko is seen by journalists and historians as a symbol of "Polish-Ukrainian brotherhood in the common struggle against the communist threat." A roundabout in Wrocław and squares in Warsaw, Koszalin and Gdańsk (the last one since November 2020) are named in Bezruchko's honour.

On 24 August 24 2022 Ukraine's 110th Mechanized Brigade received the honorary name of Marko Bezruchko.
