= Vinkivtsi Raion =

Former subdivision of Khmelnytskyi Oblast, Ukraine

Vinkivtsi Raion Віньковецький район
- Raion
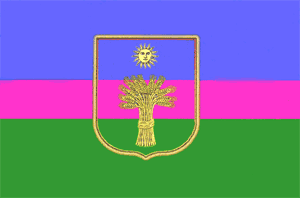
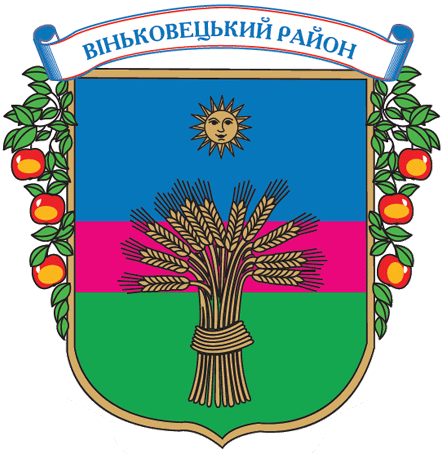
- Flag Coat of arms

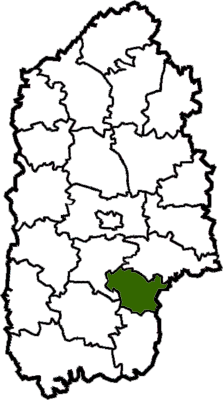
- Coordinates: 49°01′59″N 27°14′01″E
- Country: Ukraine
- Region: Khmelnytskyi Oblast
- Established: 7 March 1923
- Disestablished: 18 July 2020
- Admin. center: Vinkivtsi
- Subdivisions: List: 0 — city councils; 1 — settlement councils; 17 — rural councils; Number of localities: 0 — cities; 1 — urban-type settlements; 35 — villages; 0 — rural settlements

Government
  - Governor: Anatoliy Panasevych

Area
  - Total: 653 km^{2} (252 sq mi)
- Elevation, at Vinkivtsi: 290 m (950 ft)

Population (2020)
  - Total: 22,740 ▼
  - Density: 34.8/km^{2} (90.2/sq mi)
- Time zone: UTC+02:00 (EET)
  - Summer (DST): UTC+03:00 (EEST)
- Postal index: 32500—32537
- Area code: +380 3846
- Website: http://vin.km.ua

Vinkivtsi Raion (Ukrainian: Віньковецький район, Vin'kovets'kyi raion) was one of the 20 administrative raions (a district) of Khmelnytskyi Oblast in western Ukraine. Its administrative center was located in the urban-type settlement of Vinkivtsi. Its population was 31,058 as of the 2001 Ukrainian Census. The raion was abolished on 18 July 2020 as part of the administrative reform of Ukraine, which reduced the number of raions of Khmelnytskyi Oblast to three. The area of Vinkivtsi Raion was merged into Khmelnytskyi Raion. The last estimate of the raion population was 22,740 (2020 est.)

== Geography ==
Vinkivtsi Raion was located in the eastern part of Khmelnytskyi Oblast, corresponding to the modern-day boundaries of the Podolia historical region. It bordered upon neighboring Bar Raion of Vinnytsia Oblast. Its total area constituted 653 square kilometres (252 mi^{2}). Accordingly, the district occupied 3.39 percent of the oblast's total area, and 2 percent of its population.

== History ==
Vinkivtsi Raion was first established on March 7, 1923 as part of a full-scale administrative reorganization of the Ukrainian Soviet Socialist Republic. On October 31, 1927, its administrative center Vinkivtsi was renamed Zatonsk in honor of Volodymyr Zatonsky, a member of the Academy of Sciences of the Ukrainian SSR. Accordingly, the district was renamed to Zatonskyi Raion (Ukrainian: Затонський район), a name which it kept until 1938 when Zatonsky was executed, and both the town and district reverted to their original names.

Vinkivtsi Raion existed up until it was dissolved in on December 30, 1962. After it was dissolved, its territory was at first annexed by neighboring Yarmolyntsi Raion; its former territory was later divided between Nova Ushytsia and Derazhnia Raions. A decree of the Presidium of the Supreme Soviet dated December 8, 1966 again re-established Vinkivtsi Raion.

== Subdivisions ==
At the time of disestablishment, the raion consisted of two hromadas:

- Vinkivtsi settlement hromada with the administration in Vinkivtsi;
- Zinkiv rural hromada with the administration in selo of Zinkiv.

The Vinkivtsi Raion was divided in a way that followed the general administrative scheme in Ukraine. Local government was also organized along a similar scheme nationwide. Consequently, raions were subdivided into councils, which were the prime level of administrative division in the country.

Each of the raion's urban localities administered their own councils, often containing a few other villages within its jurisdiction. However, only a handful of rural localities were organized into councils, which also might contain a few villages within its jurisdiction.

Accordingly, the Vinkivtsi Raion was divided into:

- 1 settlement council—made up of the urban-type settlement of Vinkivtsi (administrative center)
- 17 village councils

Overall, the raion had a total of 36 populated localities, consisting of one urban-type settlement, and 35 villages.
