= Vinkivtsi =

Rural locality in Khmelnytskyi Oblast, Ukraine

Vinkivtsi Віньківці
- Rural settlement
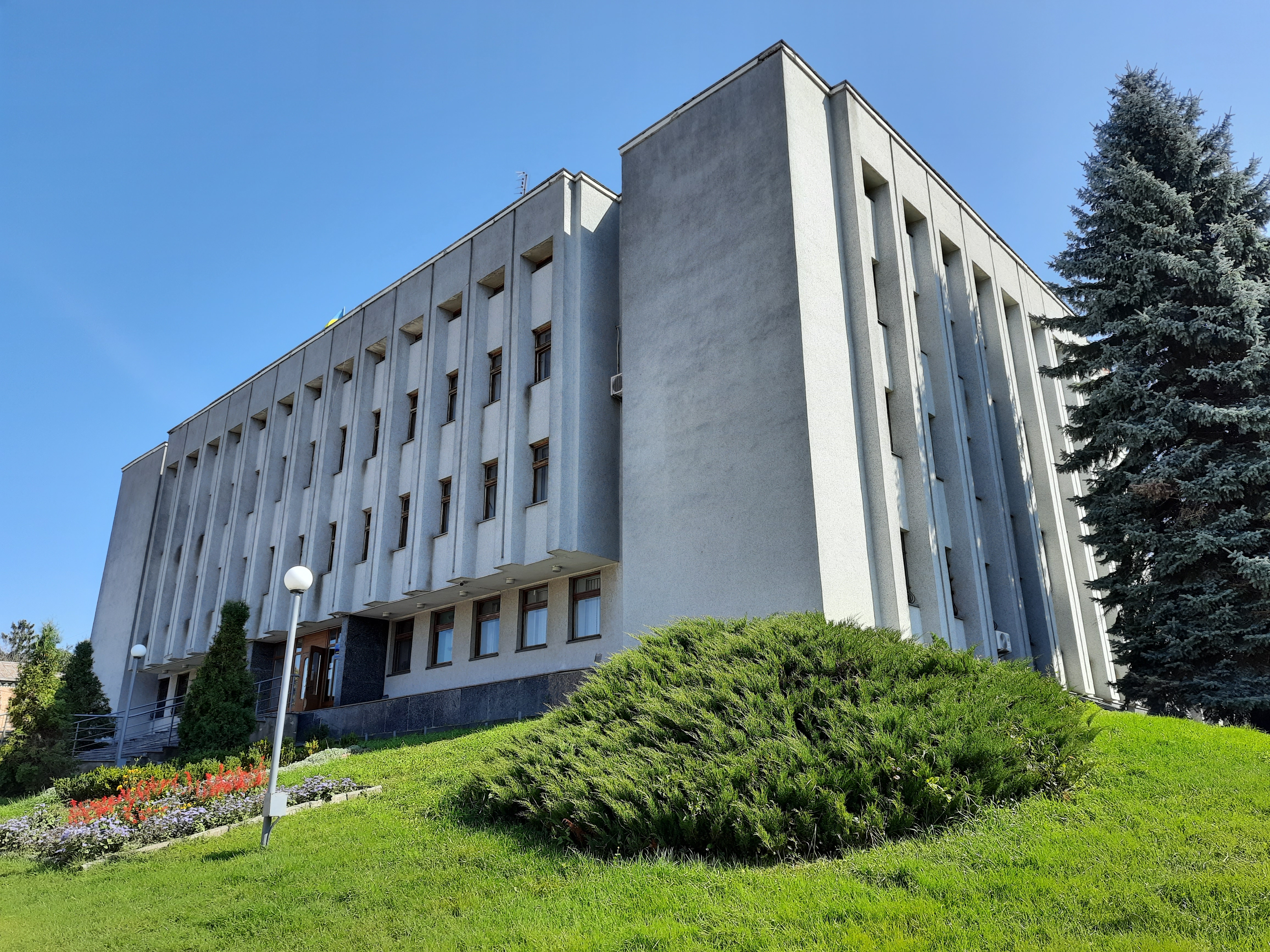
- An administrative building in Vinkivtsi

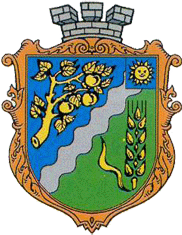
- Coat of arms

- Location within Khmelnytskyi Oblast Location within Ukraine
- Coordinates: 49°01′59″N 27°14′01″E
- Country: Ukraine
- Oblast: Khmelnytskyi Oblast
- Raion: Khmelnytskyi Raion
- Hromada: Vinkivtsi settlement hromada
- Founded: 1493
- Town status: 1957

Government
  - Town Head: Vasyl Ananchuk

Area
  - Total: 11.45 km^{2} (4.42 sq mi)
- Elevation: 290 m (950 ft)

Population (2022)
  - Total: 5,997 ▼
  - Density: 523.8/km^{2} (1,357/sq mi)
- Time zone: UTC+2 (EET)
  - Summer (DST): UTC+3 (EEST)
- Postal code: 32500
- Area code: +380 3846
- Website: http://rada.gov.ua/

Vinkivtsi (Ukrainian: Віньківці, Polish: Wońkowce) is a rural settlement in Khmelnytskyi Raion, Khmelnytskyi Oblast, western Ukraine. It hosts the administration of Vinkivtsi settlement hromada, one of the hromadas of Ukraine. The settlement's population was 6,937 as of the 2001 Ukrainian Census. Current population: 5,997 (2022 estimate).

== Geography ==
Vinkivtsi is located on the Kalius river, a tributary of the Dniester, in the historical region of Podolia.

== History ==
The settlement was first founded in 1493. In 1927, it was renamed Zatonsk (Ukrainian: Затонськ) in honor of Volodymyr Zatonsky, a member of the Academy of Sciences of the Ukrainian SSR. It received the status of an urban-type settlement in 1957.

Until 18 July 2020, Vinkivtsi was the administrative center of Vinkivtsi Raion. The raion was abolished in July 2020 as part of the administrative reform of Ukraine, which reduced the number of raions of Khmelnytskyi Oblast to three. The area of Vinkivtsi Raion was merged into Khmelnytskyi Raion.

Until 26 January 2024, Vinkivtsi was designated urban-type settlement. On this day, a new law entered into force which abolished this status, and Vinkivtsi became a rural settlement.

== Gallery ==
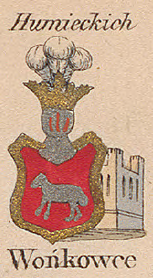
Polish name of Vinkivtsi on a 1863 map

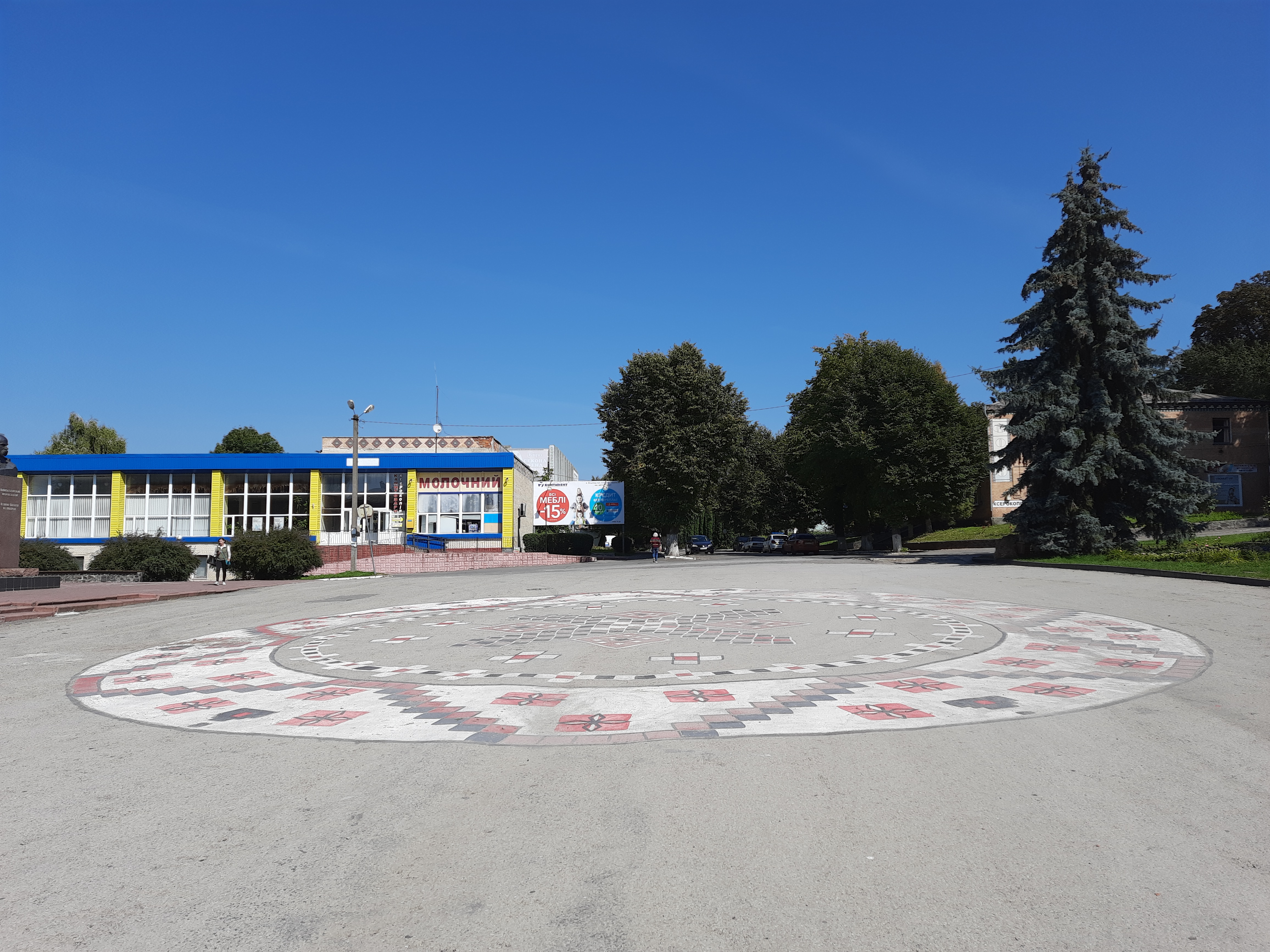
Central square

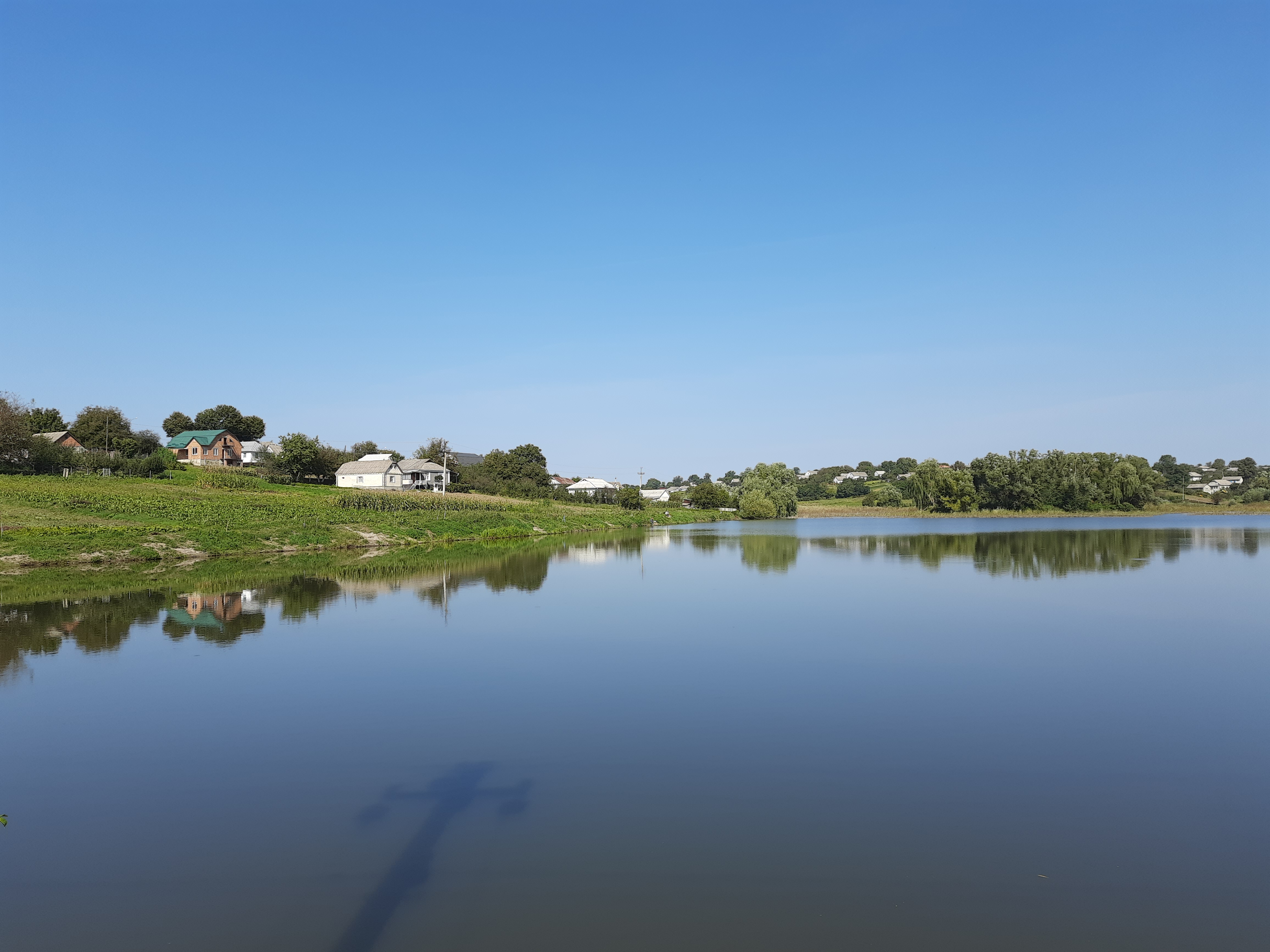
Pond

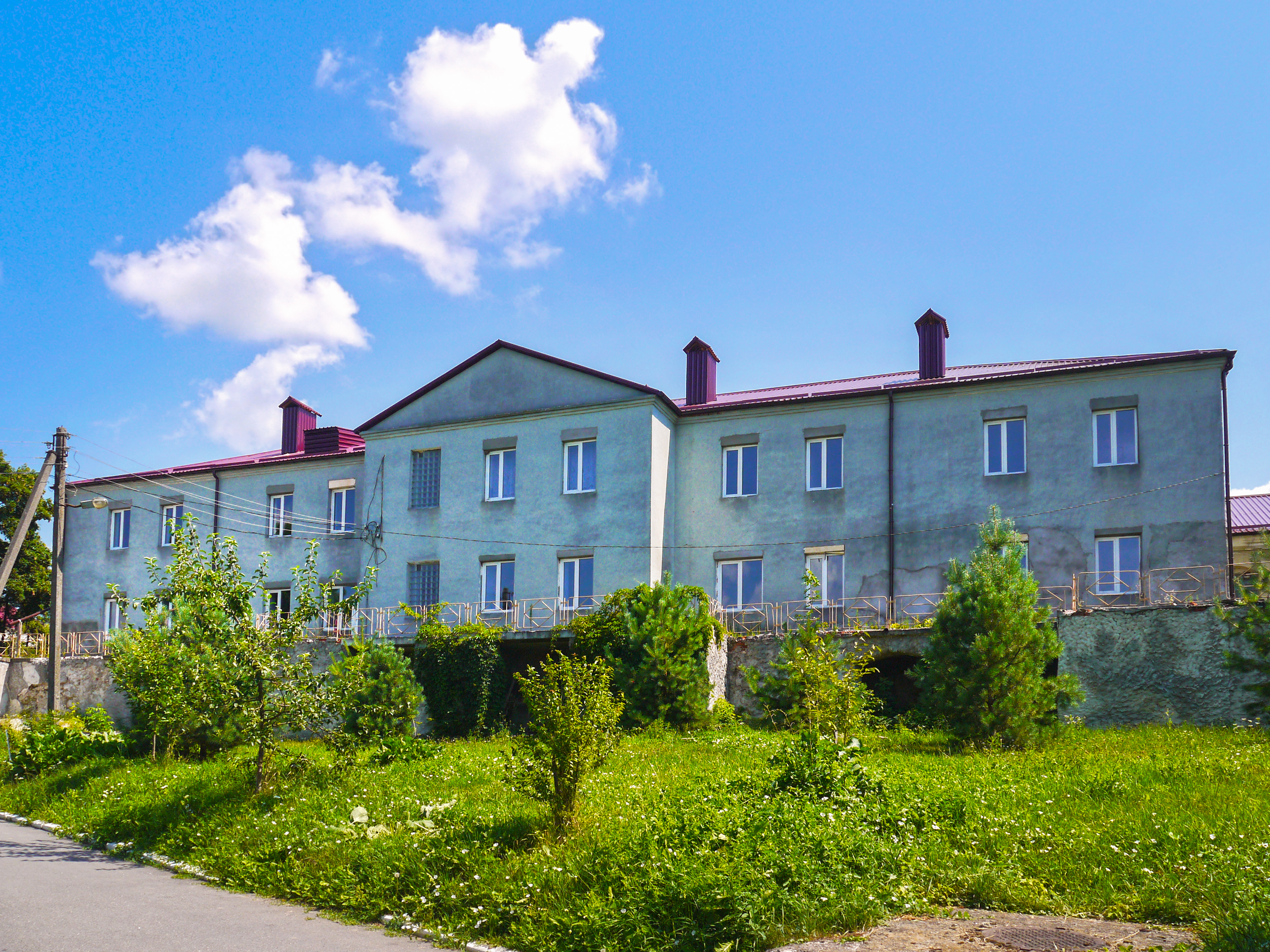
Former manor, now a hospital
