= Antoni Listowski =

Polish general

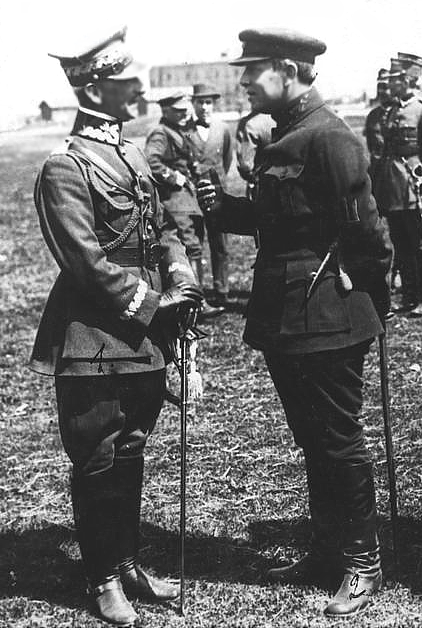
Antoni Listowski and Symon Petliura in Berdychiv, April 1920

Antoni Listowski (29 March 1865, Warsaw – 13 September 1927, Warsaw) was a Polish military officer. After being a major general of the Imperial Russian Army (from 1916 on), he became general in the Polish Armed Forces and took part in the Polish–Soviet War.

General Antoni Listowski won the battle for Pinsk in March 1919 commanding the 9th Infantry Division. The city was taken over in a late-winter blizzard with considerable human losses sustained by his 34th Infantry Regiment who forced the Bolsheviks to retreat to the other side of the river.

General Antoni Listowski, was a professional officer who had served in the Tsarist army. He had had wide experience on the front and possessed the temperament of an ardent fighter, particularly valuable when directing the kind of manoeuvres necessary in a war conducted on the country's borders. If it was a question of the operational problem of the 9th Division, then replacing Listowski with Sikorski was a very rash move. — Józef Lewandowski

On 5 April 1919, Listowski's troops committed the Pinsk massacre, executing thirty five suspected pro-Bolshevik Jews. While Listowski was not directly responsible for the massacre, which was ordered by Aleksander Narbutt-Łuczyński, he did justify the killings afterwards. In his order to the population of Pinsk of 7 April 1919, two days after the massacre, Listowski claimed that the "town's Jews as a whole were guilty of the crime of blatant ingratitude."
