= 1st Cavalry Division (Poland) =

Former Polish Army formation (1919–29)

- Active: 1919–1929
- Country: Poland
- Branch: Land forces
- Type: Cavalry
- Engagements: Polish-Bolshevik War: Koziatyn; Wołodarka; Koziatyn; Brody; Komarow

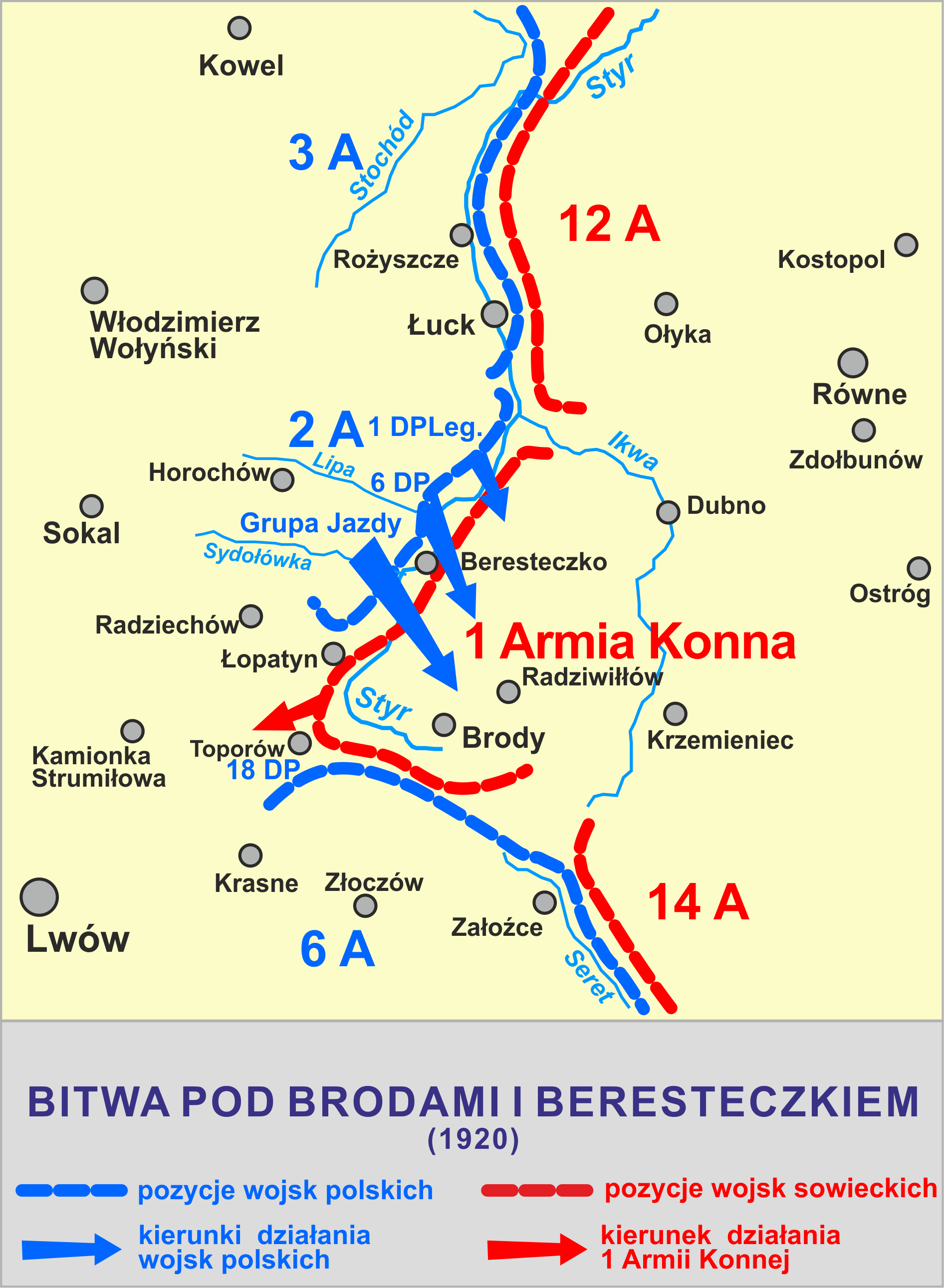
Battle of Brody 29/07-03/08-1920

The Polish 1st Cavalry Division (Polish: 1 Dywizja Jazdy, later 1 Dywizja Kawalerii) was a formation of the Polish Army between the World Wars. Formed in 1919, partially of veterans of the Polish Legions, the unit saw extensive action during the Polish-Bolshevik War.

== History ==
The unit was formed in 1919, compromising of six regiments, each with their own distinct history and made up of World War I veterans who had served in the Austrian, French, German, and Russian armies. As such, the division was composed of a variety of soldiers with different equipment and training. Additionally, its soldiers had fought in opposing armies during World War I. The 1st Cavalry Division was, in this regard, a prime example of the new Polish Army, which was composed in a very similar way of soldiers with completely different military backgrounds but with the common goal of defending their newly reestablished country.

The division took part in the operation which resulted in the battle of Koziatyn and the capture of Kiev in late April and early May 1920, then under the command of Jan Romer.

After this, the unit fought in the battle of Wołodarka, where it faced the Russian Konarmia, led by Semyon Budyonny, who had served as a corporal under Aleksander Karnicki, now the 1st Cavalry Division's commander, in the Imperial Russian Army. The division managed to stop a Russian breakthrough in this battle on 29 May, despite being outnumbered six to one. However, this success could not permanently stop the advance of the Russian forces towards the Polish rear and the division had to retreat.

The division fought the Konarmia again in early June, around Koziatyn, before the Russian cavalry was called to attack Kiev. In another engagement between those two cavalry forces on 10 June, between Zhitomir and Koziatyn, the Konarmia's advance was again halted but the need for more troops on the northern front eventually forced the Poles to retreat.

Upon Piłsudski's orders, cavalry from the northern frontline was moved south in the beginning of July, to reinforce the 1st Cavalry Division in an attempt to decisively defeat the Konarmia, which was seen as the major threat on the southern front for the Polish Army. This expanded force was put under the command of General Kazimierz Raszewski. Meanwhile, Budyonny's forces advanced and took Równe on 2 July. The Konarmia managed to advance as far as Brody by early August, when the 1st Cavalry Division, together with a Cavalry unit under General Kazimierz Sawicki, was ordered to counterattack, but shortly after had to withdraw to the north due to the worsening situation on the northern frontline.

At the battle of Komarów on 31 August 1920, when the division completely defeated the Russian 1st Cavalry Army, it was commanded by Juliusz Rómmel.

The 1st Cavalry Division was heavily reorganised in 1924, as were the other Polish cavalry divisions. The previously separate mounted rifle regiments were integrated with the four cavalry divisions.

The division was disbanded, along with the 3rd and 4th Cavalry Division, in 1929 and 1930 upon the orders of Pilsudski, who had come to the conclusion that cavalry was outdated. Only the 2nd Division in Warsaw remained in existence as a backup force to counter a possible coup attempt.

== Structure ==
=== Formation ===
The unit was formed in 1919 from six individual regiments.

- 1st Lancers: Made up of veterans of the Imperial Russian Army, from an all Polish regiment
- 8th Lancers: Made up from veterans of the Austro-Hungarian Army
- 9th Lancers: Made up partly from veterans of the 3rd Lancers of the Austrian Landwehr and the 2nd Lancers of the Polish Legion
- 14th Lancers: Made up of veterans of the Imperial Russian Army
- 16th Lancers: Made up of veterans of the Prussian Army
- 2nd Light Horse: Made up of veterans of the Polish Legion

=== Reorganisation in 1924 ===
The Polish cavalry divisions were heavily reorganised in 1924. The 1st Cavalry was now one of four divisions, the divisional headquarter being based in Białystok. Of the others, the 2nd was based in Warsaw, the 3rd in Poznań and the 4th in Lwów. The new organisation, still consisting of six regiments, was:

- 4th Cavalry Brigade – based in Wolkowysk, consisting of:
  - 2nd Lancers – based in Suwałki
  - 3rd Light Horse – based in Suwałki
- 8th Cavalry Brigade – based in Białystok, consisting of:
  - 10th Lancers – based in Białystok
  - 3rd Mounted Rifles – based in Białystok
- 11th Cavalry Brigade – Augustów, consisting of:
  - 1st Lancers – based in Augustovo
  - 9th Mounted Rifles – based in Grajewo

One of the main aims of this reorganisation was to integrate the mounted rifle regiments into the cavalry divisions, which had previously existed separately as a form of second-class cavalry.

== Commanders ==
- Jan Romer
- Aleksander Karnicki
- Juliusz Rómmel
- Mikołaj Waraksiewicz

== Members ==
- Stanisław Maczek, commanding officer of all the Polish forces in the United Kingdom 1945-47, was in command of the assault battalion of the First Cavalry Division in the summer of 1920.

== In history ==
A 1st Cavalry Division, made up partly of Polish lancers of the 1st Regiment of Lighthorse-Lancers, existed in the French Army under Napoleon, being part of the Imperial Guard, from 1807 until 1815. This unit took part in most major engagements of the Napoleonic Wars after 1807 and was highly regarded by Napoleon.

== See also ==
- Polish cavalry
- Uhlan (Polish: Ułanów), a form of light cavalry originating from Poland
- Lancer, a form of cavalry originating from Poland

== Sources ==
- Warsaw 1920 – Lenin's failed conquest of Europe, Adam Zamoyski, Harper Collins Publishers, 2008, ISBN 978-0-00-725786-7
