= Yurii Patsan =

Ukrainian artist

- Юрій Іванович Пацан
- Born: December 11, 1963 (age 61); Parkhomivka, Kyiv Oblast, Ukraine

Yurii Patsan on the cover of the newspaper "Culture and Life"

Yurii Patsan (Ukrainian: Пацан Юрій Іванович, born December 11, 1963, in the village of Parkhomivka, Kyiv Oblast, Ukraine) is a Ukrainian artist. Knight of the "Order of Merit" of the III degree (2008), Honored Artist of Ukraine since (2014).

Honorary member of the People's Academy of Arts for the Disabled of Ukraine (2003). Head of the Kyiv region organization of creativity of the disabled. The liquidator of the accident at the Chornobyl nuclear power plant of the II category. Participant of all-Ukrainian and international exhibitions and festivals.

== Biography ==
In 1991 he graduated from the Irpin Industrial College.

From 1986 he worked at the Institute of Radiology, until 1999 – a turner at the plant.

== Creativity ==
He began to draw after a terrible car accident in 1999, which confined him to a wheelchair. Icons became the first serious theme in creativity.

Author of over 800 works. The main direction is landscapes.

Solo exhibitions: Chabany (2002, 2003, 2010), Kyiv (2003, 2004, 2005, 2007, 2008, 2009, 2011, 2012, 2013, 2015, 2016, 2017, 2018, 2020), Athens (2004), Parkhomivka (2005), Boiarka (2006), Volodarka (2008), Malyutyanka (2008), Moscow (2009, Russian Federation), Sambir (2015), Novodnistrovsk (2016), Bukovel (2017), Khust (2017), Chernihiv (2019).

Works are kept in private collections in Russia, Germany, Canada, China, United States.

In 2010, Yurii Patsan's Palette exhibition hall was opened in Chabany, Kyiv region

== Prizes and awards ==
- "Order of Merit" of the III degree (2008);
- Honored Artist of Ukraine since (2014);
- honorary citizen of Kyiv-Sviatoshyn district (2010);
- Cultural Diplomacy International Award (2022);
- laureate of the Serhii Vasylkivskyi International Art Prize (2021);
- winner of the Grand Prix of the International project competition "Taras Shevchenko unites peoples";
- winner of the Grand Prix of the All-Ukrainian Competition of Inclusive Fine Arts named after Maria Prymachenko (2021);
- laureate of the M. Ostrovskyi Prize (2009);
- laureate of the 2nd degree of the All-Ukrainian festival of creativity of the disabled (2003);

== Sources ==
- Пацан Юрій Іванович, Державні нагороди України. Кавалери та лауреати (том VI)
- Юрій Пацан — заслужений художник України, Жінка-українка
- Майбутній класик?, Культура і життя, April 8, 2016, № 14.
- Творчий шлях художника Юрія Пацана, Центр української культури та мистецтва, January 27, 2015.
- Пацан Юрій Іванович, Художники України, Київ, 2005, № 9.
- Клименко, О. Своєю творчістю вселяє віру, Голос України, December 13, 2018.
- У Києві експонують живопис Юрія Пацана, якому не заважає малювати інвалідний візок, Україна молода, August 21, 2021.
- Уся краса України на картинах Юрія Пацана, Rid i Vira, July 17, 2021.
- Ювілейний творчий вечір заслуженого художника України Юрія Пацана «Маю честь запросити», Invak, December 13, 2018.
- Приречений на нерухомість художник Юрій Пацан створив понад 2000 полотен і мріє станцювати поблизу Ейфелевої вежі // BukNews, March 18, 2018.
