= Cossack Brigade =

Cossack Brigade can refer to:

- a military brigade composed of Cossacks
- Free Cossack Brigade of Vadim Yakovlev
- Persian Cossack Brigade of Vsevolod Lyakhov (also known as Iranian Cossack Brigade)
- 6th Separate Cossack Motorized Rifle Brigade
