= Jan Romer =

Polish general (1869–1934)

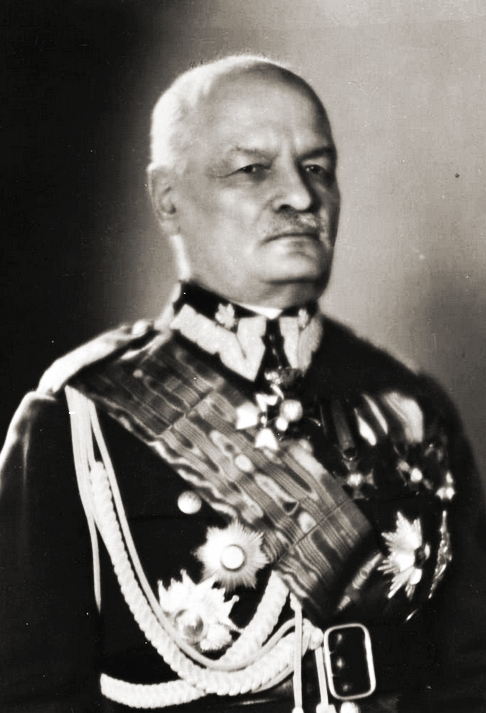
- Jan Edward Romer
- Born: 3 May 1869; Lviv, Austria-Hungary
- Died: 5 March 1934 (aged 64); Warsaw, Second Polish Republic
- Military career
- Allegiance: Austria-Hungary; Second Polish Republic
- Branch: Austro-Hungarian Army; Polish Army
- Service years: 1887–1932
- Rank: Generał dywizji (Major general)
- Unit: General Inspector of the Armed Forces
- Commands: Inspector of the Land Forces
- Conflicts: First World War; Polish–Ukrainian War; Polish–Soviet War
- Awards

Jan Edward Romer (1869 in Lwów – 1934 in Warsaw) was a Polish general and military commander.

Studied in Mödling and joined the Austro-Hungarian Army. During the First World War fought at the battle of Limanowa (1914) and battle of Gorlice (1914), was wounded twice.

Later he joined the newly recreated Polish Army. During Polish–Ukrainian War he fought in the battle of Lemberg (1918). In Polish–Soviet War, commanded the 1st Cavalry Division at the Battle of Koziatyn (April 25–27, 1920), one of the most spectacular raids of the Polish cavalry, during the Polish advance towards Kiev. He was also the commander of the Command of the Polish Army Rear in Ukraine. His troops fought against Semyon Budyonny's 1st Cavalry Army. He commanded the Polish 13th Infantry Division during the Battle of Komarów (August 31, 1920).

Respected by Józef Piłsudski, he was among the first group military personas who confirmed the decoration of Virtuti Militari, highest Polish military decoration, restored after the recreation of the Second Polish Republic, and he himself received the Commander's Cross of that award. Held position of Inspector of the Army after the war.

Buried in Powązki Cemetery in Warsaw.

== Honours and awards ==
- Commander's Cross of Virtuti Militari
- Silver Cross of Virtuti Militari (1920)
- Commander's Cross with Star of the Order of Polonia Restituta (8 November 1930)
- Commander's Cross of the Order of Polonia Restituta (2 May 1923)
- Cross of Valour (four times)
- Gold Cross of Merit (17 March 1930)
- Grand Cross of the Order of the Crown of Romania (Romania, 1929)
- Grand Cross of the Hungarian Order of Merit (Hungary, 1931)
- Grand Officer of the Legion of Honour (France, 1929)
- Commander of the Legion of Honour
- Order of Leopold (Austria-Hungary)
- Order of the Iron Crown, 2nd Class (Austria-Hungary)
- Order of the Iron Crown, 3rd Class (Austria-Hungary)
