= Battle of Wołodarka =

1920 battle in the Polish-Soviet War

- Part of Polish–Soviet War
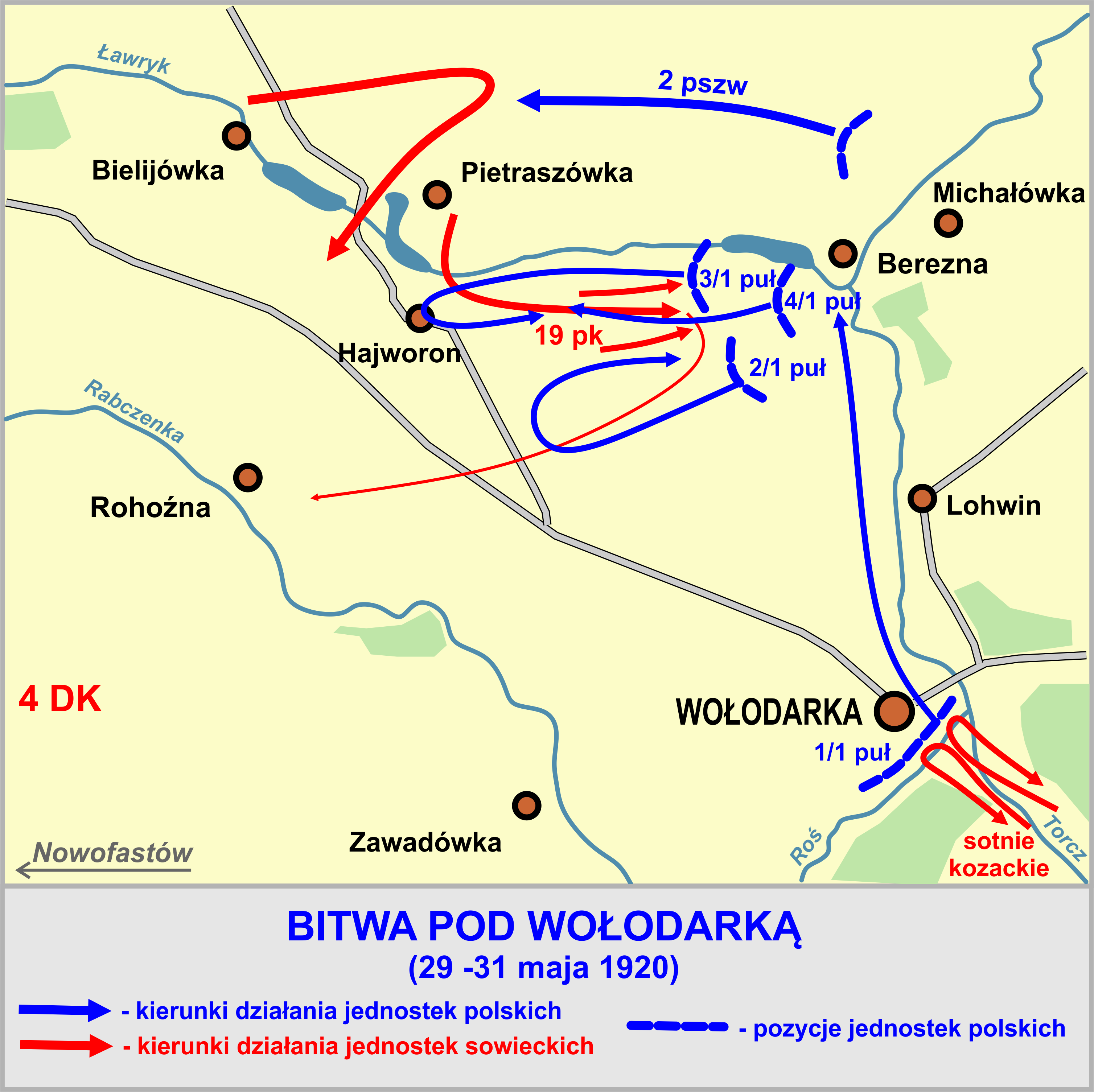
- Charge at Wołodarka: a 1935 painting by Mikołaj Wisznicki.
Date	29–31 May 1920
Location	Volodarka, near Kyiv, Ukraine
Result	Polish tactical victory

Belligerents
Poland	Russian SFSR

Commanders and leaders
Stefan Dąb-Biernacki	Alexander Yegorov

Strength
2 infantry regiments 1 cavalry regiment 1 artillery group	4th Cavalry Division

Casualties and losses
Unknown	Unknown

The Battle of Wołodarka was a clash between the Polish Army and Semyon Budyonny's First Cavalry Army. It took place between 29 and 31 May 1920, near the Ukrainian village of Volodarka, in the course of the Polish Offensive on Kiev during the Polish-Soviet War.

== Before the battle ==
After the Polish Army captured Kiev on 7 May 1920, it became apparent that Józef Piłsudski's plan to fight a major battle against the Soviet armies in Ukraine had failed. The Soviets avoided battle, withdrew from all of right-bank Ukraine, and also gave up its capital. At the same time, Red Army headquarters ordered Semyon Budyonny's battle-proven 1st Cavalry Army to relocate to Ukraine, begin an offensive, and outflank the overstretched Polish forces and Symon Petlura's small contingent of Ukrainian People's Republic troops.

The Soviet advance finally began on 26 May 1920, with the Red 12th Army and Komdiv Iona Yakir's Corps crossing the Dnieper River and attacking the weakest part of the Polish defenses. The assault began the same day as the reorganization of the Polish forces in the area, and was initially aimed at the Polish 7th Infantry Division, the weakest and least battle-proven Polish unit. In addition, the Polish defenses were weakened by the relocation of a large part of the Polish forces to northern Polesie, where Piłsudski was preparing defenses against possible Russian attack. The following day, Budionnyi's 1st Cavalry Army joined the assault and attacked the Polish 6th Army's 13th Infantry Division. The Soviets planned to outflank the Poles and Ukrainians by forming two giant pincers advancing separately toward Bila Tserkva and Khvastiv.

However, apart from the fresh and battle-proven units of the First Cavalry Army, the Russian commander of the Southwestern Front, Komandarm Alexander Ilyich Yegorov, had only the 12th Red Army, reinforced with fresh, untrained recruits, which had been badly beaten during the Soviet retreat from Ukraine only a month earlier. Due to this, the planned offensive could not begin on all fronts at once, and the mobility of the troops was limited. On 29 May 1920 the commander of the Polish 3rd Army ordered a counterattack. Lt. Col. Stefan Dąb-Biernacki's newly formed Wasilków Group was to attack the Yakir Group before it could attack the weakened 7th Division. The assault was successful, and the group — comprising a single (5th Legions) infantry regiment, reinforced with one battalion of the elite 1st Legions Infantry Regiment, two artillery groups, and two cavalry squadrons — was able to take the Soviets by surprise. After the first assault, the Bolshevik 44th Rifle Division had lost one of its brigades and its entire staff, which delayed the Soviet assault on the Polish northern flank, thus securing it. However, at the same time the southern flank, between the Polish 3rd and 6th Armies, was threatened by the First Cavalry Army, which had crossed the Dnieper River and was concentrating near Uman. From there, it easily broke the thin line of Polish defenses and began a fast advance toward the strategically important railway node of Koziatyn.

== The battle ==
On 29 May 1920, the Soviet 1st Cavalry Army's 4th Cavalry Division attacked Polish positions at the villages of Volodarka, Berezno and Novokhvastiv. The area was defended by the Polish 44th Kresy Rifle Regiment, 16th Greater Poland Uhlan Regiment, elements of the 1st Krechowce Uhlan Regiment, and the 7th Mounted Artillery Group. The Polish defenders formed strong pockets of resistance in the villages — a tactic that had shown itself to be superior to an attempted defense of an entire frontline.

Due to this, the Soviet forces could not fully exploit their numerical advantage. In addition, poor command procedures caused the Soviet cavalry regiments to begin their attacks on the Polish positions in piecemeal fashion. Moreover, instead of simply bypassing the Polish positions, the Russian commander decided to attack them frontally. After the initial Cossack cavalry assault was repelled with heavy-machine-gun fire, the Polish cavalry counter-charged the Cossacks, and an intense hand-to-hand cavalry battle with sabres ensued. Both sides suffered major casualties. For example, the Polish 1st Krechowce Uhlan Regiment's third squadron lost 30 of 72 men and a similar number of horses. The Polish charge succeeded. When further reinforcements arrived and joined in, the Cossacks fled the field.

== After the Battle ==
The following day, the 3rd Don Cossack Cavalry Brigade, comprising Cossacks who had formerly served in Gen. Anton Denikin's White Russian army and then been forcibly drafted into the Red Army, approached Polish positions and, after brief negotiations, switched sides to fight on the Polish side against the Bolsheviks, under the name of Free Cossack Brigade. Colonel Vadim Yakovlev would remain the brigade's commander until it was disbanded in 1923.

Due to the Polish forces' strong resistance and high mobility, the 1st Cavalry Army's assault was repelled. Only the 6th Cavalry Division managed to break through the lines of the Polish 13th Infantry Division, but was repulsed the following day (31 May 1920) and, after three days of heavy fighting, forced to retreat to its initial positions near Uman.
