= Command of the Polish Army Rear in Ukraine =

- Active: April–June 1920
- Garrison/HQ: Vinnytsia

The Command of the Polish Army Rear in Ukraine (Polish: Dowództwo Etapów Wojsk Polskich na Ukrainie; DEU) – a logistics unit of the Polish Armed Forces during the Polish–Soviet War.

== Organizational formation and changes ==
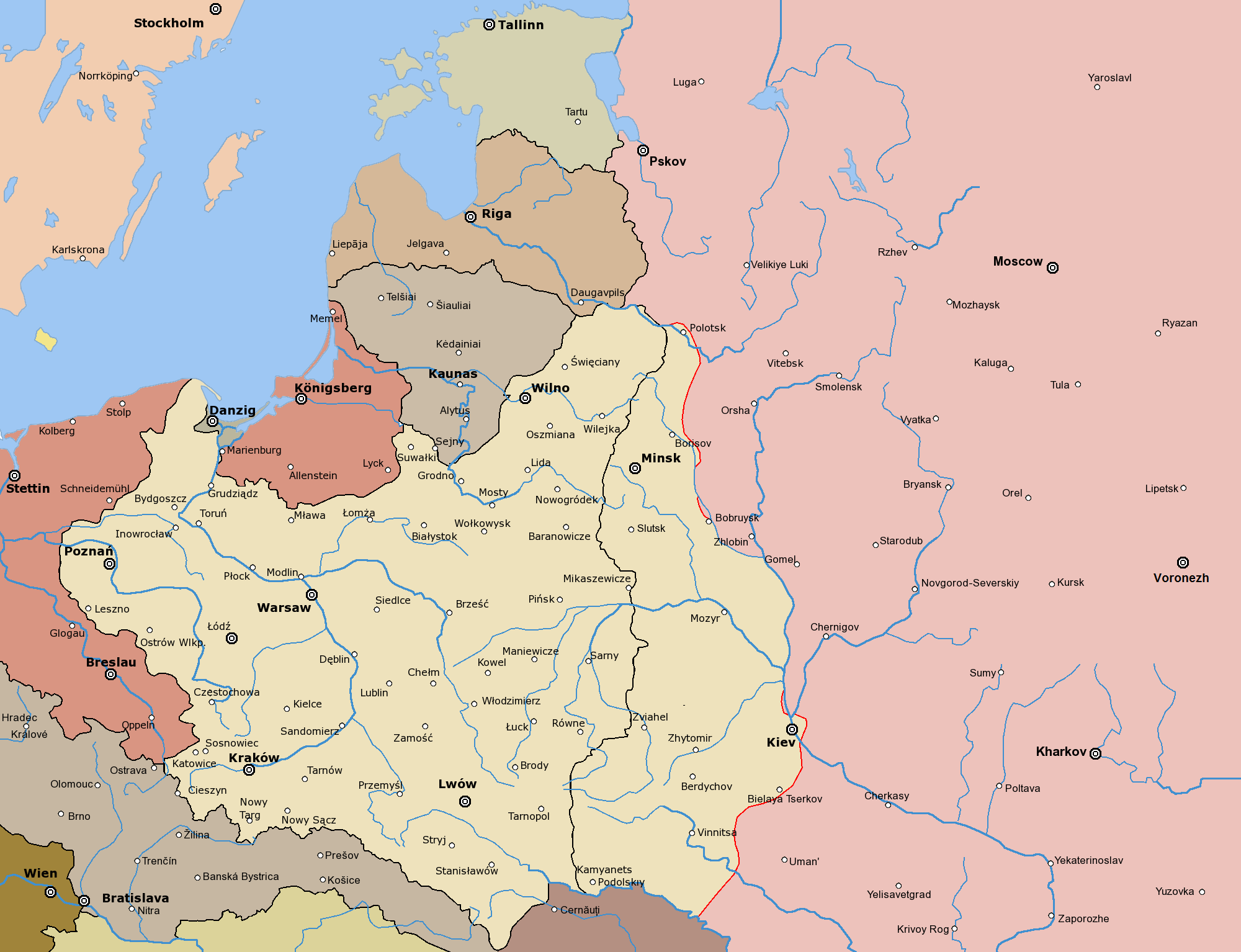
Joint Polish-Ukrainian Kiev offensive at its height in June 1920

To improve the management of Polish formations and supply units in the territory of right-bank Ukraine, the Polish Army Rear Command in Ukraine was established, headquartered in Vinnytsia. General Jan Romer, an officer of the former Austro-Hungarian army, was appointed its commander. The command's tasks included securing the rear of Polish forces operating in Ukraine, exploiting Ukrainian territory, ensuring the security of communication lines, cooperating with the authorities of the Ukrainian People's Republic, and assisting in the formation of the Ukrainian People's Army. Local members of the Polish Military Organisation were mobilized to assist the DEU in Vinnytsia, and many representatives of the Polish intelligentsia were employed in military offices and agencies. Polish scouting and high school students served, securing the city and its immediate surroundings.

The DEU's operations covered the area between the Polish–Soviet front line of April 25 and the western border of the operational areas of the 2nd, 3rd, and 6th Armies. Directly subordinate to it were the Proskiriv Logistics District and the Shepetovka Logistics District Command, which was in the process of being organized. This command was to include the Starokonstiantyniv and Rivne counties, as well as parts of the Ostroh, Zviahel, Ovruch, and Lityn counties. (Note: The Shepetovka DOE was established on the basis of funds from the Rivne DOE, which was disbanded.)

The Polish Army Stage Command in Ukraine faced numerous material, personnel, and logistical challenges. They also encountered resistance from local Ukrainian authorities, partially fueled by distrust of the Poles. General Romer wrote in his memoir:

The Ukrainian nation and government undoubtedly lack a sense of reality. Too much philosophy, too much words, too little action, too little concreteness. Mr. Grocholski's claim that he is a head without members, a command without a division, contains much truth. There are great economic and social deficiencies here, and the profiteering is horrendous [...]. The peasant has plenty of money, the government has none at all. Poland largely pays for the Ukrainian administration, and in Vinnytsia itself, the economic office of the Polish Division feeds the Ukrainian army, a country flowing with milk and honey.

Following alarming reports of Semyon Budyonny's 1st Cavalry Army's successes, on June 9, General Romer issued an order to evacuate the DEU from Vinnytsia. A lack of coordination prevented most officers from collecting their personal belongings. Only the Command's files were loaded onto the wagons. Panic also gripped the local Polish community.

The chaos of the evacuation caused the civilian authorities and the city militia to flee. Only the rolling stock of the 3rd Kielce Logistics Battalion remained in the barracks. When the evacuation train reached Klevan, General Romer sent a small detachment under the command of Lieutenant Stanisław Lis-Błoński to Vinnytsia with the task of establishing contact with General Franciszek Krajowski's 18th Infantry Division, which was retreating to Vinnytsia. Within a few days of service in Vinnytsia, they were joined by several dozen militiamen, soldiers, and scouts returning from the frontline. "House committees" were organized to keep watch in buildings and relay information to the army about emerging robbery gangs. Every day, he sent location reports via couriers to the DEU, which was stationed in Starokonstiantyniv.

== Staff ==
- DEU Commander - Gen. Jan Romer
- DEU Quartermaster - Gen. Mieczysław Norwid-Neugebauer
- Chief of Staff - Maj. Walery Sławek
- Adjutant - Lt. Przemysław Nakoniecznikoff-Klukowski
- Adjutant - Lt. Jan Potocki

== Bibliography ==
- Dominiczak, Henryk (1992). Granica wschodnia Rzeczypospolitej Polskiej w latach 1919–1939. Warszawa: Wydawnictwo Naukowe PWN. ISBN 8301102020.
- Odziemkowski, Janusz (2019). Polskie formacje etapowe w Galicji Wschodniej na Wołyniu i Ukrainie w latach 1918-1920. Warszawa: Wydawnictwo Naukowe Uniwersytetu Kardynała Stefana Wyszyńskiego. ISBN 9788380906167.
- Odziemkowski, Janusz (2013). "Organizacja i ochrona zaplecza wojsk polskich na Litwie i Białorusi (luty 1919-lipiec 1920)". Przegląd Historyczno-Wojskowy. 4 (246). Warszawa: Dom Wydawniczy Bellona. ISSN 1640-6281.
- Odziemkowski, Janusz (2014). "Użycie batalionów etapowych i wartowniczych wojsk polskich w walkach w Galicji, na Wołyniu i Lubelszczyźnie, 11 lipca–1 września 1920 roku". Przegląd Historyczno-Wojskowy. 3 (249). Warszawa: Dom Wydawniczy Bellona. ISSN 1640-6281.
