= Volodarka settlement hromada =

Volodarka settlement hromada Володарська селищна громада
- Hromada
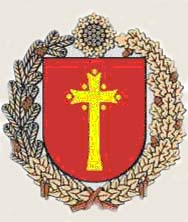
- Seal
- Interactive map of Volodarka settlement hromada
- Country: Ukraine
- Oblast: Kyiv
- Raion: Bila Tserkva

Area
  - Total: 619.2 km^{2} (239.1 sq mi)

Population (2020)
  - Total: 15,670
  - Density: 25.31/km^{2} (65.54/sq mi)
- Settlements: 34
- Rural settlements: 1
- Villages: 32
- Towns: 1

Volodarka settlement hromada (Ukrainian: Володарська селищна громада) is a hromada of Ukraine, located in Bila Tserkva Raion, Kyiv Oblast. Its administrative center is the town of Volodarka.

It has an area of 619.2 square kilometres (239.1 mi^{2}) and a population of 15,670, as of 2020.

== Composition ==
The hromada includes 34 settlements: 1 town (Volodarka), 32 villages:

- Berezna
- Biliivka
- Volodymyrivka
- Haivoron
- Horodyshche-Kosivske
- Horodyshche-Pustovarivske
- Zavadivka
- Zraiky
- Druzhba
- Kapustynsi
- Klenove
- Korzhykha
- Kosivka
- Lykhachykha
- Lobachiv
- Lohvyn
- Marmuliivka
- Matviikha
- Mykhailivka
- Nadrosivka
- Nove Zhyttia
- Ozhehivka
- Parkhomivka
- Petrashivka
- Ratush
- Rachky
- Rohizna
- Rubchenky
- Rude Selo
- Tarhan
- Chepizhyntsi
- Shevchenkove

And 1 rural-type settlement: Vesnyanka.

== See also ==
- List of hromadas of Ukraine
