= Battle of Koziatyn =

- Part of Polish–Soviet War
Date	April 1920
Location	Koziatyn, Volhynia (Ukraine)
Result	Polish victory

Belligerents
Poland	Russian SFSR

Commanders and leaders
Jan Romer	Sergei Mezheninov; Ieronim Uborevich

Strength
1 cavalry division	2 infantry divisions

Casualties and losses
9 killed 33 wounded	Unknown; 8,000 captured 500 killed

The Battle of Koziatyn (also known as the Raid on Koziatyn and Koziatyn Envelopment) of 25–27 April 1920 was a raid done by the Polish cavalry during the Polish–Soviet War. As a result of a pincer maneuver some 160 kilometres behind the front line, the Polish Army was able to seize the strategically important town of Korosten. The town, a major railway hub and a Red Army supply depot, was captured with negligible Polish losses.

The battle, along with a similar Raid on Korosten, resulted in a complete disruption of the Soviet 12th and 14th Armies of the South-Western Front. The Soviets lost approximately two divisions and a large amount of materiel, and roughly 8000 Soviet soldiers became prisoners of war. This allowed the Polish forces to capture Kiev soon afterwards. The maneuver is taught in military colleges around the world as an example of a blitzkrieg-like offensive executed before the advent of tank warfare.

== Before the battle ==
In the early months of 1920, the Polish headquarters realized that it had insufficient forces to wage a full-scale war against the Soviets on all fronts of the Polish–Soviet War. To counter the threat of a large-scale offensive by the Red Army, the Polish HQ prepared a preemptive strike in the south towards Kiev. This was to create a large operational space in the southern section of the front and allow the Poles to move parts of their forces northwards, to Belarus, while leaving the southern flank secured by Petlura's forces nominally of the defunct Ukrainian People's Republic, allied to Poland at that time. In order to neutralize superior Soviet numbers, the Poles decided to create a large, all-cavalry unit that was to strike a wedge between the Soviet 12th Army and the Soviet 14th Army, thus disrupting their defenses and encircling a large number of enemy troops between the front line and a large pocket of resistance created far behind it.

The unit, called the Cavalry Division, comprised units withdrawn from other fronts. Commanded by Gen. Jan Romer, it started to be formed in early April, some two weeks prior to the planned offensive. The first unit to be transferred to the southern front was the 5th Cavalry Brigade, moved to the area on April the 12th. The 4th Cavalry Brigade arrived soon afterwards. Although both brigades were seriously undermanned and under-equipped, they formed a considerable force by contemporary standards. However, all sub-units until then fought separately and did not have enough time to train cooperation. Finally, the commander of the new division was a skilled staff officer who had no cavalry experience.

== Opposing forces ==
The Polish units consisted of a Cavalry Division as well as several smaller detachments. The division was composed of 192 officers and 6260 privates and NCOs, and 5881 horses. It was equipped with only 8 Russian 3-inch (76 mm) guns and 8 Italian 75 mm guns, as well as 69 machine guns of various calibers. The rear of the division was to be guarded by the Polish 15th Infantry Division that was to follow the assaulting cavalry and replace it as soon as the town was taken and secured.

The Russian defenders consisted of the 44th and 58th Rifle Divisions, as well as various smaller elements of both the 12th and 14th Red Armies.

== The raid ==
=== Opening moves ===
The assault started on 25 April at 4 AM. The 9th Uhlan Regiment aided by elements of the 14th Uhlan Regiment and 4th Mounted Artillery Battalion crossed the Sluch river and formed the offensive's spearhead. They were followed by the remainder of the 14th Regiment, the 8th, 1st and 16th Uhlan Regiments, as well as the 2nd Light Cavalry Regiment and the 4th and 5th Mounted Artillery Regiments. Initially there was no contact with the enemy as the route led through dense forests and the cavalry advanced at a fast pace, with the artillery much to the rear.

The first clashes occurred at 8 AM when the 9th Regiment reached the village of Prutivka (now Zhytomyr Oblast), from where it was attacked by the machine guns of a brigade of the Soviet 17th Cavalry Division (composed of the 94th and 100th Regiments, with 800 men at arms altogether). The commander of the 9th Regiment, Rotmistrz (Captain) Józef Dunin-Borkowski ordered his unit to assault the village. The 2nd squadron assaulted the village on foot, while the 1st squadron outflanked it from the south and was to attack from the rear. However, the Polish assault failed and the Russians counter-attacked the Polish left wing with a cavalry charge. However, two waves of Russian cavalry were repelled by Polish machine gun fire. The result was a stalemate, with neither side able to defeat the other. In order to sustain momentum, General Romer ordered his artillery to shell the village and the 14th Regiment to aid in the assault. This finally broke the Soviet defenses and allowed the Poles to advance. The Soviet forces withdrew to the south-east where they were intercepted by the 1st squadron of the 9th Regiment and forced to retreat further east.

After half an hour of rest, the march was resumed. In the village of Tartak Cudnowski, a company of Soviet engineers was surprised during construction work and surrendered almost without a shot fired. From there a patrol of the 14th Regiment with an artillery platoon moved to secure the southern flank of forces along the Teterev river and a ford in the village of Nova Rudnya (now in Zhytomyr Oblast, Ukraine). After another rest, at 5.30 PM the assault was resumed. Soon before midnight, the Division reached the village of Rudnya and remained there for the rest of the night. Since the enemy was expected to occupy the nearby village of Troyanivka (now Khmelnytskyi Oblast), the units were ordered to remain silent. During the first day of the offensive, Polish units advanced some 80 kilometres behind Soviet lines without alerting the enemy.

=== Day 2 ===
By the end of the following day the Polish forces planned to reach the outskirts of the town of Koziatyn and advance through the villages of Gwozdkowo, Siemiaki, Skakówka, Krasivka and the town of Białopol. The vanguard for the second day was formed by the 1st Uhlan Regiment and a battery of the 5th Mounted Artillery Battalion. The main force consisting of the remainder of the 5th and 4th Brigades was to follow, while the rear guard was to be formed by the 9th Uhlan Regiment shielding the tabor of the division. In addition, as the element of surprise lost much of its meaning, the Polish command dispatched numerous patrols to find the enemy and link up with the 15th Infantry Division slowly following the spearhead.

The division resumed its advance at 4 AM. After crossing the Gniłopłat river, the spearhead reached a relatively good road which allowed the Polish forces to advance quickly. General Romer ordered the cavalry to advance two thirds of the road at a trot (10 minutes at a trot, then 5 minutes in step). By 7.30 AM the spearhead had reached train stations at Reja and Siemianki, on the rail road linking Koziatyn with Zhytomyr. In order to prevent the Soviets from recapturing Koziatyn with an armoured train, both stations, rail lines and the telegraph line and rails were destroyed. The Poles then proceeded further into the Russian-held territory, where they were to organize a 1-hour rest.

Around midday the Tabors were attacked by an armoured train whilst crossing the railroad near Siemianki. Polish carts were withdrawn beyond range of Russian artillery and the crew of the train left it to observe the effects of their fire. However, by that time the 9th Uhlan Regiment managed to turn back and assault the train from the other side of the tracks. The train retreated, thus allowing the Poles to resume their advance. Although the skirmish was fierce and artillery fire was used on both sides, Polish casualties were negligible: one NCO and several horses were killed and several cart drivers were wounded.

During the skirmish, a Polish fighter plane appeared over the battlefield. Seeing the Polish carts withdrawing, the pilot returned to base and reported that the Poles were in retreat and severely defeated. Meanwhile, the Polish advance was resumed. General Romer ordered a platoon of the 1st Uhlan Regiment to leave the main route and follow the tracks leading towards Zhytomyr. The unit reached a wooden railway bridge and took its crew by surprise. The bridge was destroyed without casualties and the unit returned to the main force.

== Assault on Koziatyn ==
=== The charge ===
By 1 PM the front guard reached the village of Białopole, where the division headquarters was to prepare an assault on the nearby town of Koziatyn. The encounter with the armoured train delayed the advance and last elements of the Polish division only arrived there at 3 PM. General Romer decided to move his troops through the dense forest north of Koziatyn, seize the village of Jankowce and then order a cavalry charge in the open terrain between the town and the forest. Then the Polish cavalrymen were to dismount and assault both railway stations - the passenger station and the cargo depot - on foot, using standard infantry tactics.

The cavalry charge was to be started before dusk, in a loose formation intended to minimize losses from enemy machine gun and artillery fire. Then the cargo depot was to be assaulted by the 14th Regiment (Eastern part), 1st Regiment (Central area) and the 16th Regiment (Western part), while the passenger station was to be attacked by the entire 2nd Light Cavalry Regiment. All regiments were reinforced with platoons of mounted infantry, while the 8th and 9th Cavalry Regiments were to form the reserve.

The 4th Brigade was the first to leave Białopole, supported by the 2nd Light Cavalry Regiment. The remainder of the division rested in the village of Wernyhorodek and waited for the 4th Brigade to arrive at the edge of the forest. However, the commander of the 4th Brigade, Maj. Tadeusz Sulimirski, ignored Gen. Romer's orders and had his men dismount and prepare an infantry assault across more than a kilometre of open terrain. Romer managed to reach the 4th Brigade and countermand Sulimirski, but precious time was lost and the soldiers were ready only by 8.30 PM. Romer feared a Russian attack might disrupt the Polish units and therefore changed his plans. Soon afterwards the charge started and the Poles rushed towards the city in a column.

While the city's outskirts were completely undefended, resistance intensified as the charging Poles reached the centre. The 2nd Light Cavalry Regiment dismounted and assaulted the passenger railway station, which was heavily defended by infantry and an armoured train. When the Poles failed to take the station by surprise, the regiment's commanding officer, por. Karski, called for artillery support and ordered his men to withdraw. A short barrage allowed the Poles to capture several buildings, supply trains and a hospital train. However, in the complete darkness that covered the battlefield, Karski ordered his men to retreat and resume the assault in the morning. During the entire struggle the 2nd Regiment lost 1 officer and about a dozen killed and wounded soldiers.

Located to the north-east was the large railway cargo depot, covering roughly 2 kilometres of area along two railway lines. At 9.30 AM the 16th Uhlans Regiment assaulted on the right flank and managed to cross the fence. Despite heavy machine gun fire, Polish soldiers managed to reach the first buildings and neutralize those machine guns on the platform with hand grenades. This allowed the 16th Regiment to seize the main station and reach a bridge leading to the passenger station. Here too the assault was also halted until the next morning. Soon the 2nd Light and 1st Uhlan Regiment joined the 16th and the Polish front-line was established along a 400 metre long track from Koziatyn to Kiev. The 14th Regiment soon joined the rest of the Polish forces, strengthening the left wing.

At midnight a squadron of the 14th Regiment, aided by a single heavy machine gun, started a sortie towards the roundhouse. The assault succeeded and at 2.30 AM the building lay in Polish hands. However, one hour later the Russians counter-attacked and by 5.30 AM the Poles were forced back to their lines, with losses on both sides.

=== Mopping-up ===
As the Cavalry Division was unable to seize the town's train stations overnight, at 6 AM, an all-out assault was ordered. The entire 14th Regiment assaulted the roundhouse, aided by a battery of the 4th Mounted Artillery Battalion. The 14th Regiment was followed by the tired soldiers of the 16th and 1st Uhlan Regiments, who spent the best part of the night fighting the Russian armoured train. As the station was filled with wagons, cars and all sorts of packages and pieces of military equipment, the units of both sides got separated into tiny groups fighting for each railway car and for each entrevoie. In the meantime the roundhouse was finally secured and the 1st Regiment seized the southern part of the station, thus pushing elements of enemy forces into the forest. This ended the fight for the cargo station as the tiny groups of enemy soldiers were surrounded and in large part surrendered quickly.

Simultaneously the Poles resumed their attack on the passenger station. The main building was a stronghold manned by around 2000 Red Army soldiers. However, this time the 2nd Light Cavalry Regiment was reinforced by the 9th Uhlan Regiment and the 7th Mounted Artillery Battalion. Following a short shrapnel barrage placed on the courtyard, the Poles managed to reach the building and pound it with hand grenades. This forced the Russians to surrender. The tired 2nd Regiment secured it, while the 9th Regiment continued the assault, skirmishing with an armoured train. As close proximity prevented either side from deploying artillery, the train was finally forced to retreat by intensive Polish machine gun fire.

Those units fighting for the station were soon reinforced by the 14th Uhlan Regiment, until then fighting for the cargo depot. The regiment assaulted the Russians from the east, finally forcing them to surrender. By 7:45 AM the town and stations of Koziatyn were in Polish hands. By the end of the day, the first elements of the 15th Infantry Division arrived to relieve the tired Uhlans. By 30 April the entire division had been withdrawn. Until then the 8th Uhlan and 2nd Light Cavalry Regiments were busy catching marauders of the routed 44th and 58th Rifle Divisions.

== Outcome ==
The raid proved to be a complete success for the Poles. The Cavalry Division managed to strike a wedge behind the rear of the Soviet 12th Army, disrupt its southern wing and cut it off from the Soviet 14th Army. In addition, the Russians lost the entire 44th Rifle Division and the 1st Rifle Brigade of the Soviet 58th Rifle Division.

By capturing Koziatyn, the Polish forces seized one of the most important railway hubs in the area and the supply depot of the entire army. In addition to roughly 8000 soldiers taken prisoner of war, the Polish Army seized 500 horses, 200 carts, 120 railway engines (25% of them readily used), over 3000 railway cars, 30 pieces of artillery, an armoured train and 7 complete hospital trains. Besides that, the prize included 170 machine guns, several dozen cars and large amounts of materiel and supplies. Among the most bizarre cargo kept in the depot was a camel captured by the 14th Uhlan Regiment. The soldiers initially wanted to take the animal with them as a mascot, but finally decided to give it to the Warsaw Zoo as a gift.

== Notes and references ==
General:

- Marcin Lewandowski (2005). "Zagon na Koziatyn". Kawaleria II RP (in Polish). Archived from the original on 2006-09-05.
- Mieczysław Biernacki (1938). "Zagon na Koziatyn". Przegląd Kawaleryjski (in Polish) (1).
- Norman Davies (2003). White Eagle, Red Star: The Polish-Soviet War, 1919-20. London: Pimlico. ISBN 0-7126-0694-7.
- Józef Piłsudski (1937–1991). Pisma zbiorowe (Collected Works) (in Polish). Warsaw: Krajowa Agencja Wydawnicza (reprint). ISBN 83-03-03059-0.
- Zbigniew Lewiński (1921). Zagon na Koziatyn (in Polish). Warsaw: Bellona.

In-line:
