= Parkhomivka =

Parkhomivka is a name of several populated places in Ukraine.

It may refer to:

- Parkhomivka, Kharkiv Oblast, a village in Krasnokutsk settlement hromada, Bohodukhiv Raion
- Parkhomivka, Kyiv Oblast, a village in Volodarka settlement hromada, Bila Tserkva Raion
- Parkhomivka, Mykolaiv Oblast, a village in Vilne Zaporizhzhia rural hromada, Bashtanka Raion
- Parkhomivka, Sumy Oblast, a village in Boromlia rural hromada, Okhtyrka Raion
- Parkhomivka, Vinnytsia Oblast, a village Illintsi urban hromada, Vinnytsia Raion
