= Vadim Yakovlev =

Russian Cossack yesaul

Vadim Yakovlev was a Russian Cossack cavalry commander, in the rank of yesaul.

A veteran of World War I, during the Russian Civil War he commanded a Cossack brigade in the ranks of Gen. Anton Denikin's White Russian army in Ukraine. Following Denikin's defeat, Yakovlev crossed the Bolshevik lines and with his men joined the Red Army as the commander of the 3rd Don Cossack Cavalry Brigade. Attached to the Semyon Budyonny's 1st Cavalry Army, the brigade was dispatched to the front of the Polish-Soviet War during the Polish offensive on Kiev.

After the Battle of Wołodarka on 31 May 1920, he again switched sides with his men and joined the Polish Army, where his grade was reaffirmed as that of a Colonel. His brigade, roughly 1700-men strong, was renamed to Free Cossack Brigade and fought alongside the Poles. The troops of Yakovlev were particularly notorious for their cruel and bloody marauding of villages and towns in Ukraine and, later, Belarus, and anti-Jewish pogroms in the early 1920s.

After the cease-fire agreement in late 1920, Yakovlev signed an alliance with the exiled government of the Ukrainian People's Republic and decided to continue the struggle against the Reds. His forces were quickly defeated and forced back to Polish-held territory. Colonel Vadim Yakovlev would remain the brigade's commander until it was disbanded in 1923.
