= Parkhomivka, Kyiv Oblast =

Village in Volodarka Raion, Ukraine

Parkhomivka Пархомівка
- Village
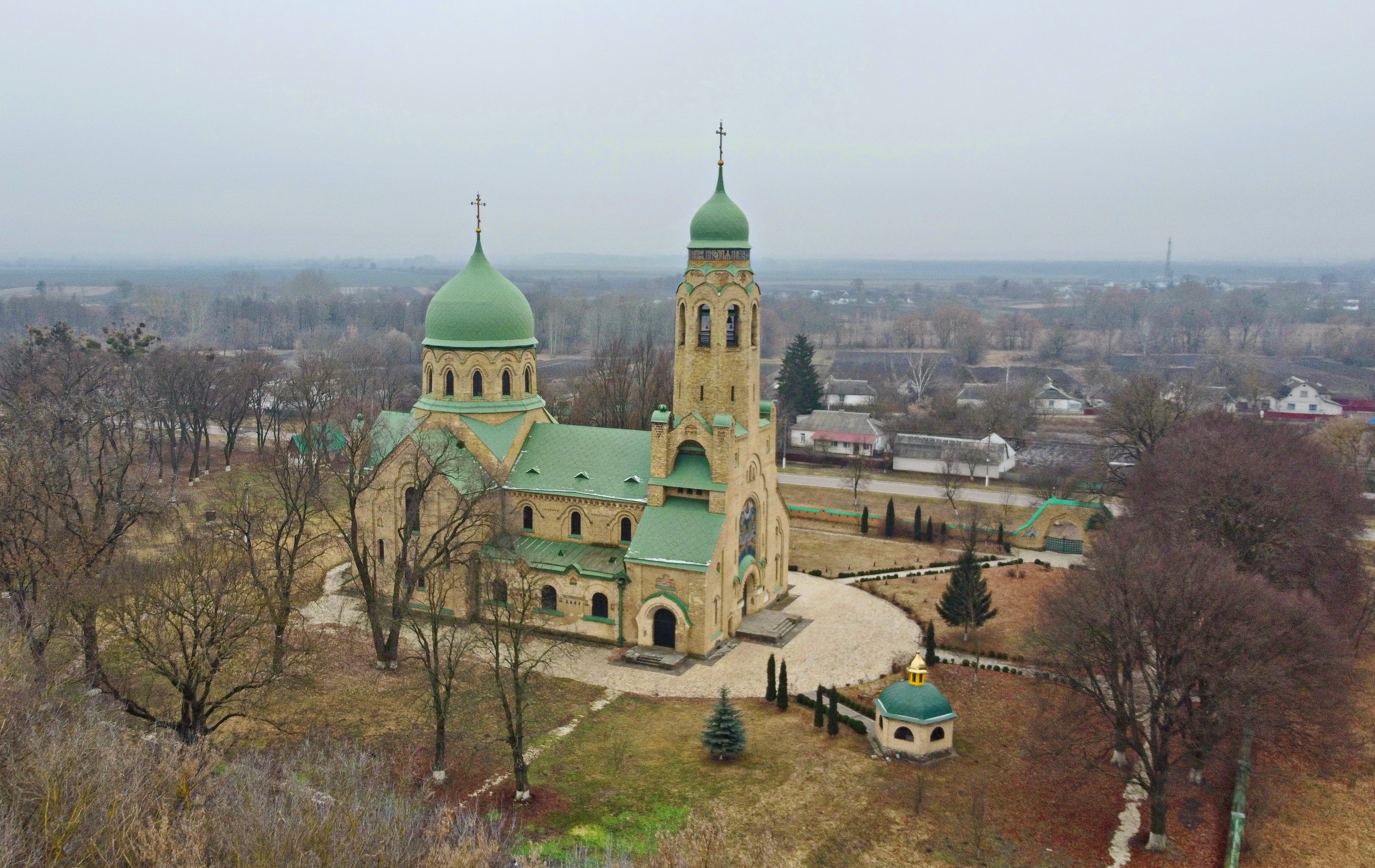
- Church of the Intercession

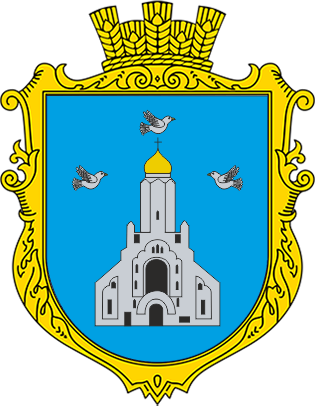
- Coat of arms

- Location in Kyiv Oblast
- Coordinates: 49°32′55″N 30°2′31″E
- Country: Ukraine
- Oblast: Kyiv Oblast
- District: Bila Tserkva Raion
- Hromada: Volodarka Hromada

Population
  - Total: 810
- Time zone: UTC+2 (EET)
  - Summer (DST): UTC+3 (EEST)
- Postal code: 09331

Parkhomivka (Ukrainian: Пархомівка) is a village in Ukraine, Kyiv Oblast, Bila Tserkva Raion, Volodarka settlement hromada.

== History ==
It was founded in 1616.

== Religion ==
- Church of the Intercession (1907, stone, OCU)

== Famous people ==
- Yurii Patsan (born 1963), Ukrainian artist.
