= Mikołaj Wisznicki =

Polish painter (1870–1954)

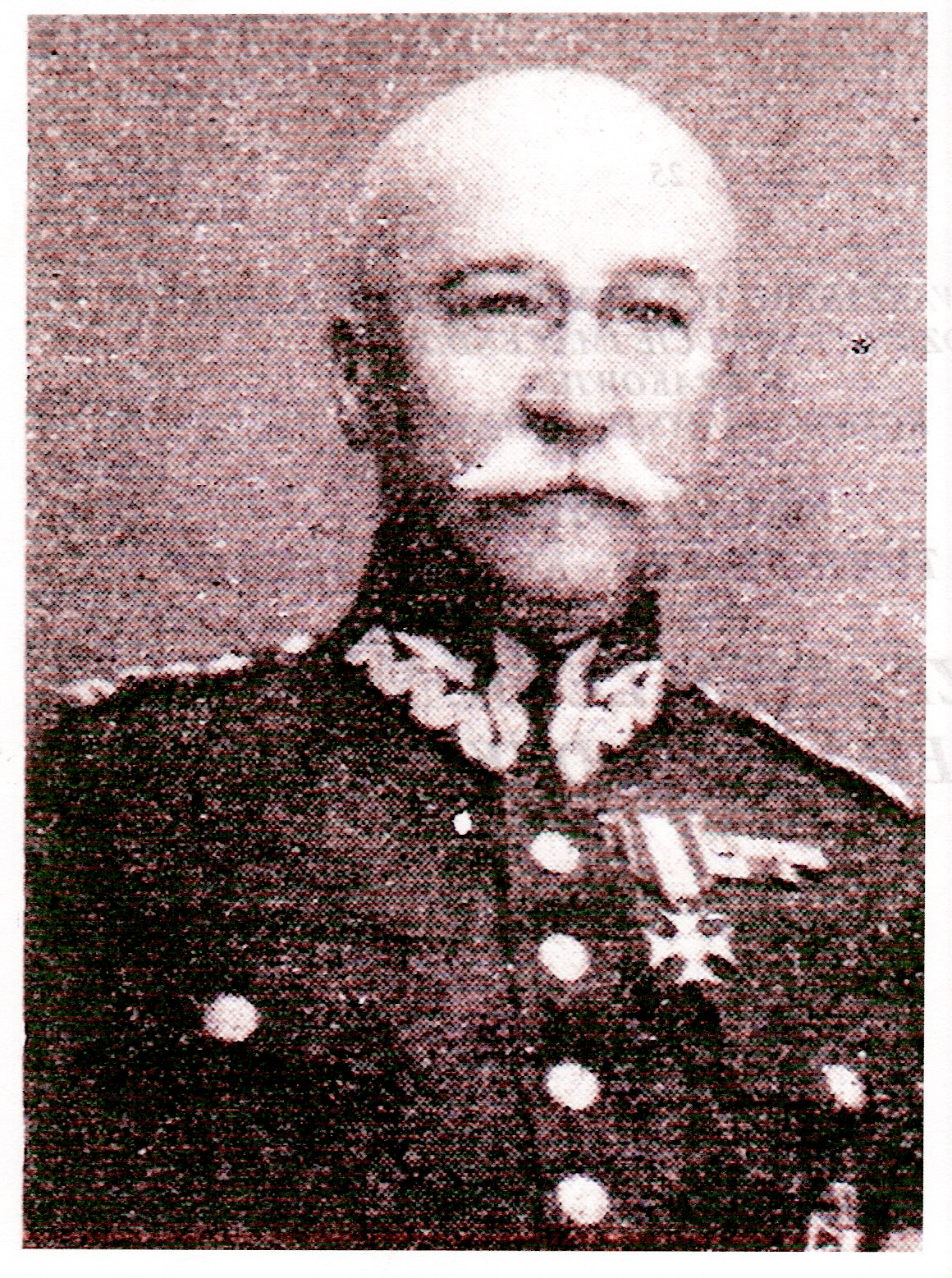
- Mikołaj Wisznicki in 1929.
- Born: 1870
- Died: 1954 (aged 83–84)
- Citizenship: Poland
- Education: University of Kiev
- Occupations: Painter; military officer
- Known for: one of the founders of the Polish Sightseeing Society (Polskie Towarzystwo Krajoznawcze)

Mikołaj Wisznicki (1870–1954) was a Polish painter, military officer and one of the founders of Polish Sightseeing Society (Polskie Towarzystwo Krajoznawcze).

Trained in the natural sciences at the University of Kiev, he was primarily known as an illustrator of children's literature. In addition, he painted oil and watercolor landscapes and equine scenes. Later, after study in the workshop of Konrad Krzyżanowski, he also practiced portrait painting.
