= Kazimierz Sawicki =

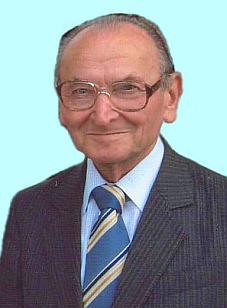
- Kazimierz Sawicki, 2014
- Born: 5 March 1926; Toruń, Poland
- Died: 26 October 2021 (aged 95); Szczecin, Poland
- Resting place: Central Cemetery in Szczecin
- Occupations: Economist, Professor of Accounting
- Known for: Szczecin School of Accounting
- Spouse: Henryka (née Wencel)
- Children: 2
- Relatives: 4 siblings (including Rev. Alfons Sawicki)
- Awards: Order of Polonia Restituta (Knight), Gold Cross of Merit

Kazimierz Sawicki (born March 5, 1926 in Toruń, died October 26, 2021 in Szczecin) was a full professor of economics, doctor honoris causa of the University of Szczecin, and a specialist in accounting. He was buried at the Central Cemetery in Szczecin.

== Early life ==
Kazimierz Sawicki was born as the fifth child of Marianna (née Łątkowska) and Stanisław Sawicki. He had three brothers – Alfons (1913), Tadeusz (1922), Jerzy (1929) – and two sisters – Czesława (1914) and Ludwika (1921). His oldest brother, Alfons, was a graduate of the Lower Missionary Seminary of the Society of the Divine Word in Rybnik....the Society of the Divine Word in Rybnik. In 1939, Alfons was arrested by the Gestapo and imprisoned in the Dachau concentration camp, where he miraculously survived until liberation.

The family derived its income from a horticultural and orchard business in Kończewice (near Chełmno), as well as from the maintenance of municipal gardens in Toruń.

During World War II, Kazimierz attended the Volksschule for Polish children (until the age of 14) and later trained as a barber. After the war, he completed his high school education at M. Kopernik High School in Toruń. In 1947, he moved to Szczecin, where he began working as an accountant in companies such as "Kryształ" and the Cast Iron Foundry. He was among the first group of students in the post-war Szczecin academic community and lived in shared accommodation with fellow students — a place informally referred to as the "kolchoz.wwo"

== Academic career ==
In 1950, he began working as an assistant in the Department of Accounting at the Academy of Commerce in Szczecin. He earned his master’s degree in 1952 at the Higher School of Economics in Łódź, a PhD in 1962, and habilitation in 1967 at SGPiS in Warsaw. He became an associate professor in 1976 and a full professor in 1983.

He headed accounting units throughout various organizational changes: the Department of Accounting in the Institute of Economic Calculations at Szczecin University of Technology, the independent Department of Accounting (1975), the Department of Accounting at the University of Szczecin (1991–1996), the Department of Financial Accounting, and the Institute of Accounting.

== Mentorship and publications ==
Sawicki supervised over 1,000 master's and bachelor's theses, and 13 doctoral dissertations (two of which were awarded by the Ministry of Science and Higher Education). He reviewed 61 doctoral and 23 postdoctoral theses. He published over 50 textbooks, scripts, and collections of exercises. Notable co-authored works include: Accounting in Road Transport (1959, with T. Waśniewski) Financial Accounting (1999, 2001, 2004) Balance Sheet Policy and Financial Reporting in Company Management (1996)

== Professional activities ==
He was a member and president of the Szczecin branch of the Polish Association of Accountants, a member of the Scientific Council and editorial board of the "Zeszyty Teoretyczne Rachunkowości," a member of the National Council of Statutory Auditors, chairman of the Audit Committee, and participant in the development of financial audit standards.

== Honors and recognition ==
He was awarded the Knight's Cross of the Order of Polonia Restituta (1977), the Gold Cross of Merit (1973), and six Ministry of Higher Education awards (1969–1980).

In 2006, he received an honorary doctorate from the University of Szczecin.

In 2021, he was awarded the West Pomeranian Griffin.

He collaborated with universities in Germany, the Netherlands, Hungary, Scotland, and Bulgaria. He also authored international works, including: Evolution des polnischen Bilanzrechts... (Verlag Kovač, Hamburg 2005).

== Family ==
Kazimierz Sawicki was married to Henryka (née Wencel). They had two children – Aleksandra and Mirosław – as well as three granddaughters, one grandson, and three great-grandchildren.

== Personal interests ==
He had a passion for travel, mountains, ice skating, operetta, and bridge.
