= 1st Cavalry Army =

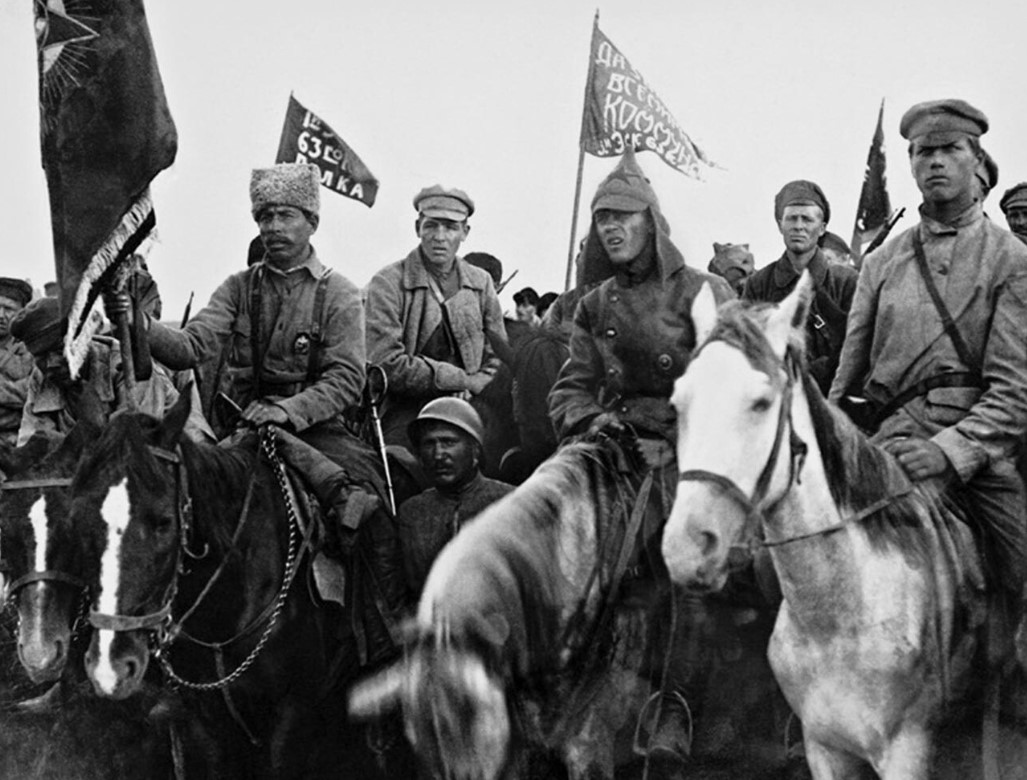
- Active: 17 November 1919–11 October 1923
- Country: (Russian Soviet Federative Socialist Republic) Russian SFSR (1919–1922); Soviet Union (1922–1923)
- Type: Cavalry
- Size: Early 1920: (Note: This list is not exhaustive i.e. just because a section does not list armoured cars that does not necessarily mean that there were no armoured cars in the 1st Cavalry Army at that time.) 15,000 cavalry 238 machine guns 19 field guns 8 armoured trains April 1920: 16,700 cavalry 'A large number of tachankas' 45 field guns 8 armoured cars 5 or 8 armoured trains 12 or 15 aircraft
- Patron: Joseph Stalin
- Engagements: Russian Civil War: Kharkov (24 November – 12; December 1919); Donbas (18–31 December 1919); Rostov-Novocherkassk (3–10; January 1920); Don-Manych (17 January – 6 February 1920); Tikhoretskaya (14 February – 2 March 1920); Kuban-Novorossiysk (3–27; March 1920) Polish-Soviet War: Kyiv (26 May – 17 June 1920); Novograd-Volyn (19–27 June 1920); Rivne ( 28 June – 11 July 1920); Lviv (23 July – 20 August 1920); Zamość (29–30 August 1920); Komarów (31 August 1920); Dytiatyn (16 September 1920); Russian Civil War: (Incomplete list)

Commanders
- Notable commanders: Semyon Budyonny

The 1st Cavalry Army (Russian: Первая конная армия, romanized: Pervaya konnaya armiya), or Konarmia (Кона́рмия, "Horsearmy"), was a prominent Red Army military formation that served in the Russian Civil War and Polish-Soviet War.

== History ==
=== Formation ===
On 17 November 1919, by the orders of People's Commissar of Army and Navy Affairs Leon Trotsky, the 1st Cavalry Army was formed. The Army was created on the basis of Semyon Budyonny's 1st Cavalry Corps with its three divisions (the 4th, 6th, and 11th) remaining under his command. Essential to the ascent of Budyonny's unit and command to that of an army was the patronship of Commissar of Nationalities Joseph Stalin. The two met during battles at Tsaritsyn in 1918 along with Commander Kliment Voroshilov, the three of them forming a long-lasting alliance and Stalin using his position as a member of the Red Army Southern Front to advance Budyonny's career. In December, Stalin brought in Voroshilov and Shchadenko, another Tsaritsyn veteran, to chair the 1st Cavalry Army's revolutionary military council along with Budyonny.

=== Southern Front: the destruction of the AFSR (1919–1920) ===
It was December 1919, and the 1st Cavalry Army was on the pursuit, chasing down an enemy now reduced to a fighting retreat all the way from Kastornoye south to the Azov Sea. Earlier in 1919, the Armed Forces of South Russia had been making progress on their march north on Moscow however, by October this was no longer the case. The advance, over extended and slowed down by attacks on supply lines by Makhno's Red-aligned anarchist partisans, had stalled and now the Red Army was primed for a counter-offensive. In October the Cavalry Army, still in its previous form as a cavalry corps, attacked along the eastern flank of the AFSR's line with the support of the 8th Army on a trajectory for Voronezh, the railway junction at Kastornoye, and ultimately Kursk. Opposing them was the depleted 1st Corps made up of cavalry that stood between the 1st Cavalry Corps and the sweeping of the front east. For the first time in massed battle was White cavalry bested by their Red counterparts. The red cavalry took Voronezh on 24th and then, through a blizzard, took Kastornoye on 15th, catching the 1st Corps between the anvil of the infantry on its left and on its right the hammer of the Red cavalry. The AFSR's 1st Corp had no choice but to retreat in fighting order to Kursk.

After taking Kursk on 17 November, the now christened 1st Cavalry Army continued pushing south through Kharkov, taking Taganrog on 6 January and then Rostov two days later. The overwhelming advance into Novocherkassk would have continued if not for the thaw. The melting snow had made the Don marshlands impassable, where it would not freeze again until 15th. Having no bridging equipment, Budyonny's men would take to burning down Rostov's hospital in the meantime, presumably with wounded White officers inside. On 17 January Budyonny was ordered by his superior, Caucasian Front Commander-in-chief Vasily Shorin, to lead his men in a head-on attack across the river against the Volunteer Corps in Bataysk. Budyonny had instead suggested taking his 9,000 sabres and 5,000 bayonets further east to cross, flanking and then striking the Volunteers from the rear but Shorin refused. The assault, even with the support of the 8th Army, failed as did the second attempt the next day. When ordered to do so a third time, Budyonny had lost his patience citing the local bogs as unacceptable for an army on horseback. Shorin responded by blaming Budyonny with the 8th Army siding with Shorin, accusing Budyonny's men of 'manifesting an extreme lack of combat resilience'. This gave the Whites the time they desperately needed to recuperate. Shorin insisted on more direct attacks on 20th and 21st with the Red Army High Command (Stavka) insisting that this would be a 'knowingly impossible offensive' and so intervened on 24th. Budyonny now got his way, crossing further east and seeing success on 28 January where they put White Cavalry to flight and captured a dozen field guns and thirty machine guns. On the next day however Mamontov's Don Cossacks struck back, besting the Cavalry Army's 11th Division. This led to a new series of spats amongst the Red commands with Budyonny blaming his once superior now turned cavalry rival, Dumenko for charging ahead without the support of the Cavalry Army with the backing of his commissar, Voroshilov.

Budyonny more and more insisted that the Red cavalry should be amassed under his command, and with his souring relations with Shorin, Sergey Kamenev and the Stavka sided with him, bringing in Mikhail Tukachevsky as the new front commander. At this point operations ceased so that Tukachevsky could prepare for the Front's next major attack: a strike force made up of the 9th, 10th, and 1st Cavalry Armies would deal a lethal blow to the AFSR at the point of least resistance, the point at which the White Volunteer Corps and Don Army met. They would attack from the River Maynch towards the key junction of Tikhoretskaya splitting and threatening the rear of each enemy army. Here the 1st Cavalry would be key, playing 'the role of a surgical knife, which was to forever separate the Kuban and Don counterrevolutions from each other'. The IV Don Cavalry Corps, now the last line of defence against the severing of the AFSR, were to counter the Red's now growing cavalry horde. On 17 February, they attacked '[breaking] up the cavalry charge of the Reds and [began] to chase them' but reinforcing divisions did not make it to the battle in time or never showed up at all and they had to fall back, allowing the 1st Cavalry to advance. Now split from their Cossack allies in the east, the Volunteers had no choice but to retreat to Novorossiysk where they would evacuate by boat to the Crimea on 26 March 1920; there the AFSR would be disbanded and its remnants formed into Wrangel's Russian Army.

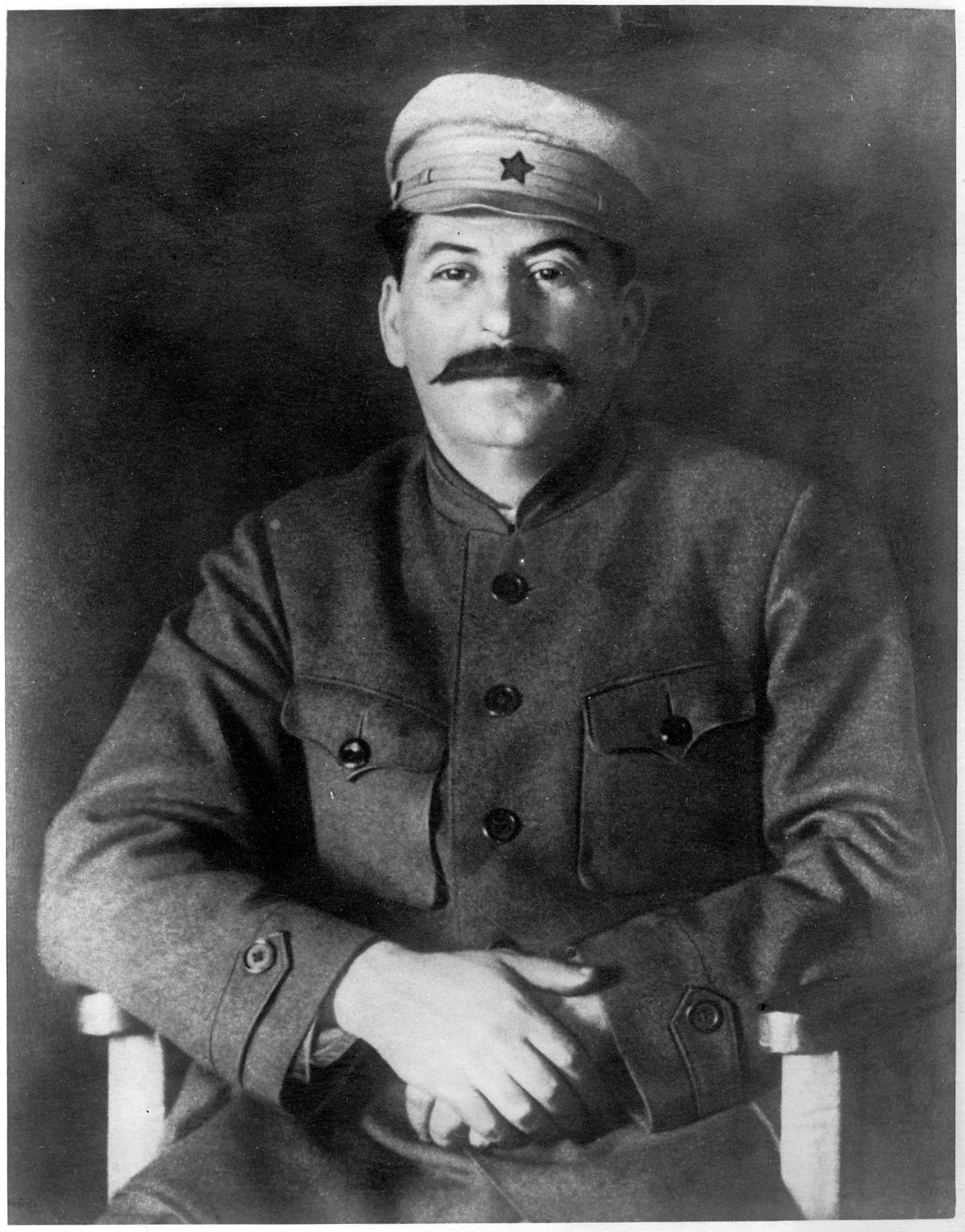
Joseph Stalin (1920)

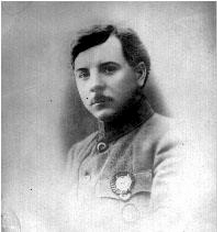
Kliment Voroshilov (1920)

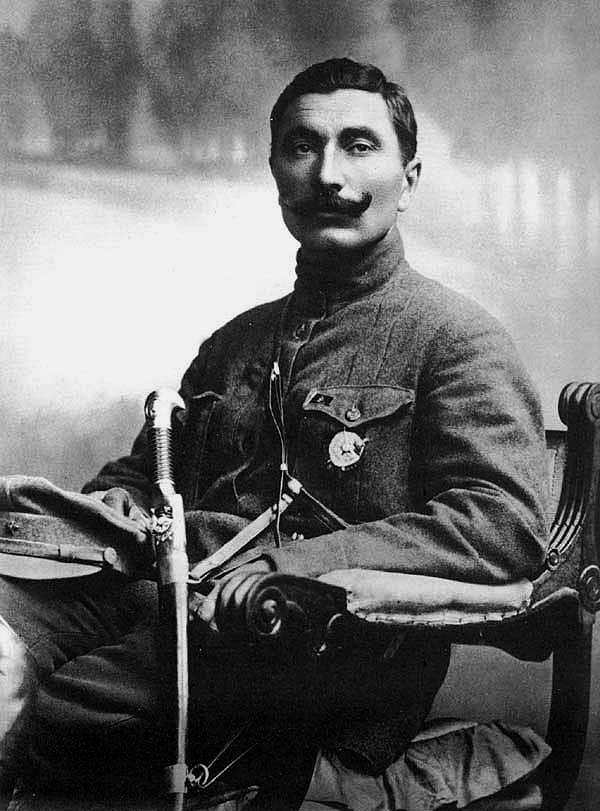
Semyon Budyonny (1918)

=== South-Western Front: the war against Poland (1920) ===
The Polish-Soviet War had started earlier in February 1919, at that point not being much more notable than gunfights between irregulars but by May 1920, the situation had changed severely. A Polish offensive stretching eastwards had reached the banks of the Dnieper and taken Kyiv on 7th, sweeping aside Red troops with minimal losses. Now with the southern counterrevolution licking its wounds, the west could be reinforced and so to the South-Western Front was sent the 1st Cavalry Army in April 1920. Upon their reaching the south-west Budyonny and Voroshilov would find an old friend: Stalin had been made commissar for the front and so with their arrival the Tsaritsyn triumvirate was back together.

On 27 May the Cavalry Army, now a force of 16,700 sabres with a great many tachankas, attacked the Polish Sixth Army's 13th Division in the direction of Zhitomir, south-west of Kyiv, in an attempt to outflank the Kyiv line. No progress was made however with its 4th Division facing defeat at the Battle of Volodarka (29–31 May) which prompted the 3rd Don Cossack Cavalry Brigade to defect to the Poles; the 6th Division would also lose a battle, south of Volodarka, at Uman on 31st. After these failures however, Budyonny got his breakthrough. On 5 June, the Sixth was pushed aside at Samhorodok with the 1st Cavalry reaching Zhitomir two days later, although momentarily being pushed back to Kozystyn by the Polish Cavalry Division; blinded by the setting sun, the Division's vastly inferior numbers were obscured to Budyonny's men. With their rear now under threat from the Red cavalry, the Third Army would leave Kyiv for the north west on 10 June, heading for Korosten and the Red Army's Golikov Group. One Polish Officer, Mieczyslaw Lepecki, would describe the scene of their retreat:

'The atmosphere was anything but cheerful. Armies usually withdraw along roads, but Budyonny moved in a wide line, across fields and pastures. ... In every village, we found unmistakable signs that his troops had recently stopped there. Smashed and burned fences, thatch torn off roofs for litter for his horses, looted food and fodder stores and the lament of girls – everything clearly testified to the passage of Budyonny's "grand" cavalry.'

As June battles raged on, Budyonny, encouraged by Stalin, ignored Red Army Commander-in-Chief Kamenev's orders to destroy the Third Army on its retreat westward. The Cavalry Army instead retook Zhitomir and captured Berdichev, massacring the garrison of the former and burning down the hospital of the latter with both wounded and nurses still inside. The Polish Army, having now reached the pre-Kyiv offensive line, stopped their retreat to face the enemy, but Budyonny would break through their lines again on 26 June, forcing a further retreat to the River Horyn in central Volhynia. The reinforced Second Army would attack the 1st Cavalry on 2 July, but the outcome was Budyonny's capture of Riwne from the 3rd Legion Division. The Reds would be pushed out of Riwne by the Second Army but simply retook it on 11th when the Second had abandoned it in order to regroup.

The 1st Cavalry Army, now having entered Galicia, began to advance on Lviv with the 14th Army on 25 July. Once Budyonny had reached Dubno however, they met resistance from the Polish 18th Infantry Division which, along with the Second and Sixth Armies and the 1st Cavalry Division, forced the Cavalry Army back at Brody (29 July–2 August). In Budyonny's failure to break the Polish front, the line now bent and folded around his flanks, threatening the Red cavalry with encirclement. On 3 August, just as the trap was about to be sprung, the two cavalry divisions that were to cut off the Army were recalled to defend Warsaw against the Red advance, allowing Budyonny's men to escape. After a pause of action, the Cavalry Army would take Brody on 13th, continuing the thrust to Lviv.

Kamenev, once again, ordered Budyonny to turn north to support Tukhachevsky in the march on Warsaw but, once again, Budyonny ignored him with the support of both Stalin and Yegorov, the front commander. Hopes were high and the idea of an advance through Lviv into Romania, Hungary, and even Italy was tantalising, as was the potential personal glory. Now lacking the support of the defeated 12th Army, the 1st Cavalry Army reached the outskirts of Lviv on 16 August. The city was held by both regular and volunteer troops including the 54th, 238th, 239th, and 240th Volunteer Infantry Regiments as well as the 2nd Cavalry Division. In one battle north of the city on 17th, a volunteer youth battalion and the 1st Battalion of the 54th would fight to the man against the 6th Cavalry Division. With little progress being made and Tukhachevsky's Western Front now in full retreat, Budyonny gave the order to abandon the siege.

On 25 August, the now worn 1st Cavalry Army went north in an advance towards Lublin. With the Red Army now in flight on both fronts, there was little reason for this besides a petty attempt by Kamenev to make up for his previous lack of stern authority and the Tsaritsyn men now feeling a greater obligation to follow orders. With Polish supremacy in the north, parts of the Fifth Army were now free to join the Third Army in hunting the much maligned 1st Cavalry Army. The Third Army, by chance, trapped the Cavalry Army in front of the walls of Zamosc on its march to Lublin, forcing it into battle with its 2nd Legion and 10th Divisions and the Sixth Army's 1st Cavalry and 13th Divisions from 29th–30 August. Now fully realising its isolation and falling back east towards the Bug River, Budyonny's men were once again engaged, now at Komarow, by the 10th, 13th, 1st Cavalry, and 2nd Cavalry Divisions. On 31 August, Komarow was the last great cavalry battle of human history ending in the defeat and retreat of the 1st Cavalry Army aided by the cover of heavy rain; up to 4,000 men died as they fled. With the last major battle fought by the Konarmia finished, battered and beaten, Budyonny's Red cavalry retreated to the other side of the Bug on 2 September, violently venting their frustrations on any Polish villages and Jewish shtetls in their path.Its last action in Poland, only by a fraction of the 1st Cavalry, was the partial destruction of the Polish 8th Division at Dytyatyn on 16 September on the South-Western Front before being destroyed itself at Ternopil.

Now having returned to Soviet territory in western Ukraine and morale low as ever, mutiny would spark in the 1st Cavalry beginning in September and spreading anarchy and violence throughout the region for three weeks.

=== Southern Front: the destruction of Wrangel's Russian Army and beyond (1920–1923) ===
Once the 1st Cavalry had come under heel, they were sent once again south to face an old enemy: In Crimea, Wrangel had reformed the devastated AFSR into a new army which had advanced into the Northern Tauride during the Polish War. The Cavalry Army was placed on the western end of the line, along with the 6th Army, intending to sweep behind the enemy to Salkovo and cut them off from the easily defended Crimea, trapping them in the Northern Tauride. The Whites would avoid this fate, retreating into Crimea on 2 November. Wrangel's Army was likely aided in this by the slow progress of Budyonny's men; they seemed much more interested in abusing the locals for cooperating with the Whites than anything else.

Although Wrangel in the end had been defeated, enemies still remained amongst the Reds. It was time to do away with the libertarian politics represented by Mahkno's anarchists and so both of the Red's cavalry armies were set upon them in August 1921, eventually destroying them. A similar fate would be met by the remnants of the White movement, reduced to petty partisans.

The 1st Cavalry Army would be disbanded on 11 October 1923.

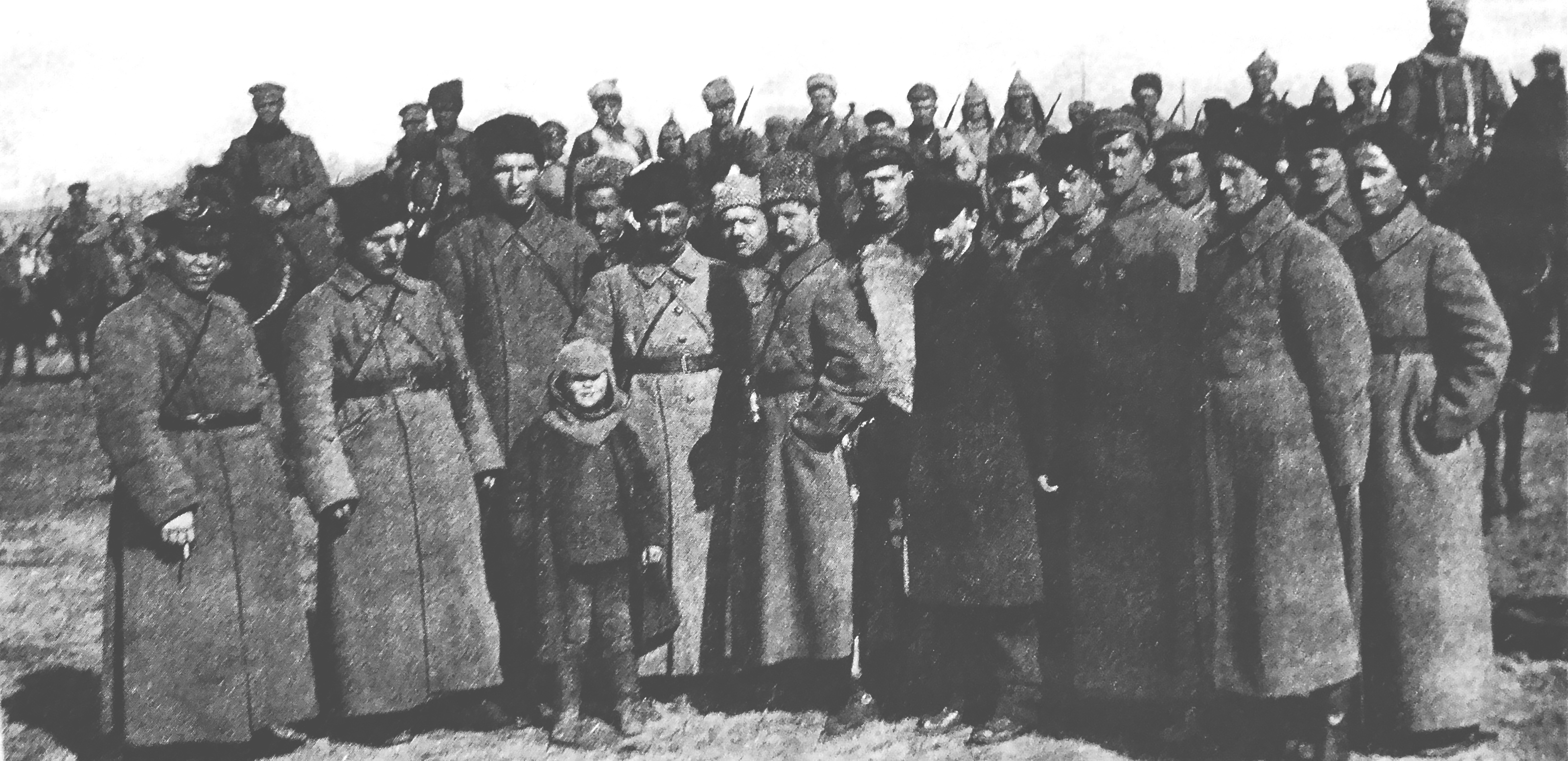
Kliment Voroshilov, Semyon Budyonny, Mikhail Frunze and Nikolai Bukharin in Novomoskovsk with the 1st Cavalry Army (1921).

=== Effectiveness ===
The wars of the Civil War period were fundamentally ones of maneuver and ones the Red Army was initially unwilling to fight. The Bolsheviks, as ever, saw things in terms of class and so to them the idea of reviving the originally aristocratic cavalry was inconceivable, whilst their military specialists saw cavalry as of little potency on a post-world war battlefield. Once the example of the White cavalry had proved these sentiments untenable, Trotsky would lead an initiative from September 1919 to greatly expand the cavalry arm of the Red Army with his rallying cry of 'Proletarians, to Horse!' The fruits of his efforts would be the 1st Cavalry Corps, an ironically rural force, which would go on to be the 1st Cavalry Army. The 1st Cavalry was a defining factor in Soviet success on the battlefield. Amongst a sea of poorly trained conscripts, the Cavalry Army was one amongst few Red Army units that could be considered 'elite' and one amongst even fewer that could provide the necessary mobility to so utterly defeat the counterrevolution.

One potential reason for the 1st Cavalry Army's military prowess was its internal sense of community. Many of its squadrons were simply renamed partisan groups who were each raised from a single village. Beyond just having a personal connection with their fellow fighters, many soldiers had brought their families with them to the front. A village on horseback would be an apt description of the wagon trails filled with cavalrymen's families. Each soldier in the 1st Cavalry wasn't just fighting for political aims, but for the safety of their friends and loved ones. (Note: In late 1919, Budyonny noted with much chagrin that the 4th Division was feeding 9,800 mouths despite only containing 3,500 fighters. He would remind his men that this was 'a fighting army and not a charitable institution' but this seemed ineffectual to sway their sentiments.)

== Order of battle ==
1st Cavalry Army Order of battle
Nov 1919 – n/a	Apr 1920 – May 1920	June 1920	July 1920	August 1920
4th Cavalry Division; 6th Cavalry Division; 11th Cavalry Division	2nd Cavalry Division; 4th Cavalry Division; 6th Cavalry Division; 9th Cavalry Division; 11th Cavalry Division; 14th Cavalry Division	4th Cavalry Division; 6th Cavalry Division; 11th Cavalry Division; 14th Cavalry Division; 45th Rifle Division	4th Cavalry Division; 6th Cavalry Division; 11th Cavalry Division; 14th Cavalry Division; 24th Rifle Division; 45th Rifle Division	4th Cavalry Division; 6th Cavalry Division; 11th Cavalry Division; 14th Cavalry Division; 8th Red Cossack Cavalry Division; 24th Rifle Division; 45th Rifle Division
Aug–Sept 1920	September 1920			
4th Cavalry Division; 6th Cavalry Division; 11th Cavalry Division; 14th Cavalry Division	4th Cavalry Division; 6th Cavalry Division; 11th Cavalry Division; 14th Cavalry Division; 24th Rifle Division			

=== Armour in the 1st Cavalry Army ===
By December 1919, the first armoured units would be introduced to the Cavalry Army. Six armoured trains would join them on their advance south against the AFSR, totalling 21 guns (76.2mm – 120mm) and 60 machine guns, with a further two joining them by 7 January 1920. These trains were: (Note: Occasionally, Red armoured trains would share the same number but could still be identified individually by their names. The list of armoured trains with Budyonny's cavalry only specified a number and so when multiple names are given it is to list all the possible trains this number could represent. A collection of names divided by slashes indicate different names attributed to the same train over time when specific dates for names and name changes aren't available.)

- No. 2 ('Victory or Death' or 'Bogatyr'/'Hero'/'3rd International')
- No. 3 ('Grozny' or 'Power to the Soviets' or 'Central Armour')
- No. 56 ('Communard' in records sometimes 'Communist')
- No. 63 ('Destruction to the Counter-Revolution' or 'Chervonnyi Cossack')
- No. 72 ('In Honour of Nikolai Rudnev')
- No. 73
- No. 82 ('Death to the Directory')
- No. 100 ('Free Russia')

These trains would act as a powerful striking force on the railways around which many battles of the Civil War were fought.

Three armoured car units would also reinforce the 1st Cavalry from November 1919: the 9th, 32nd, and 1st (52nd) 'In Honour of Sverdlov' detachments – a detachment being made up of two platoons of two cars each.

When war broke out with Poland and the 1st Cavalry was sent west, an issue immediately became apparent. Polish and Russian rail tracks were of a different gauge: Budyonny's trains could not use them. The solution was to slowly replace the tracks with the correct gauge as the Red front advanced but this still meant that the Cavalry Army's armoured trains would be handicapped for the duration of the war. Several of the trains with the Army would be captured by the Poles, such as No. 72 'In Honour of Nikolai Rudnev' and No. 82 'Death to the Directory' on 2 June in an ambush. No. 56 'Communard' was also captured earlier in March but it is not clear if it was with the Cavalry Army at this time. The Army itself would capture an armoured train on 23 June after derailing it and slaughtering its crew: this was the 'General Dowbor' which the poles had captured from the Ukrainians, then 'Sichovyi', who themselves had captured it from the Reds who originally dubbed it 'Comrade Voroshilov'.

=== Aircraft in the 1st Cavalry Army ===
By the time of its deployment against the Poles, the 1st Cavalry Army had developed an air force consisting of three reconnaissance detachments: the 24th, 36th, 41st. On paper this included up to 15 aircraft but at most there would only ever be 12 pilots available to fly them. A further tax on the Army's flying power for some time was the introduction of British Nieuport fighter planes captured from Taganrog and Novorossiysk – Budyonny insisted on their use after seeing how effective the RAF fighters were against his sabres at Tsaritsyn – which required the retraining of pilots. When the Air Group had reached their frontline airfield on 20 May, only 6 crews were considered combat ready.

In June however, the Army's aviation would ramp up its activity with 16 reconnaissance sorties being flown in preparation for a breakthrough, identifying key weaknesses in enemy positions for the cavalry to exploit. Now with the Polish line rolling back and the 1st Cavalry rapidly advancing, a problem arose: how can the Air Group, limited to operations near airfields, keep up with and support the Horse Army? This was answered by so-called 'forward aviation echelons', squadrons made up of the most reliable aircraft travelling by air with the cavalry and setting up makeshift airfields on suitably flat ground as they went. Supplies for these echelons, transported by trucks and horse wagons, would follow close behind whilst aviators slept under the wings of their machines in open fields at night. They would continue to provide valuable reconnaissance, and in some cases bombing support, until June; the constant sorties and exposure to the elements left the aircraft in a sorry state, leading to breakdowns and accidents but no loss of life.

By July the 1st Cavalry's air contingent was rapidly deteriorating and it would only get worse in August. Just before the start of that month the 24th Detachment had only one fighter in good condition, whilst the 36th had not a single machine not in need of repairs, and with logistics and infrastructure so lacking, the idea of replacing any aircraft was a fantasy. This did not seem to irk commanders on the ground very much however as they continued their advance, using scouts on horseback in lieu of reconnaissance flights. At this point the Cavalry Army had reached Lviv where the Polish defence had hardened and where during battles Polish planes would strafe Budyonny's horsemen. In one example, over 100 men and 100 horses of the 6th Division were killed by Polish strafing runs on 17 August alone. Without any real aircraft of their own to counter these raids the 1st Cavalry turned to the machine guns on their tachanka carts as a fairly effective alternative. 'Anti-aircraft ambushes' were even developed where a fake convoy would act as bait for enemy fighters; when a plane would lower in altitude to strafe, machine guns hidden amongst nearby trees or buildings would open fire. One such ambush on 28 July scored hits against four enemy aircraft. Despite these developments, the Polish Air Force would still contribute to the defence of Lviv against the Cavalry Army, by the end having dropped over 8 tons of bombs and firing up to 25,000 cartridges at Budyonny's forces.

== Legacy and in media ==
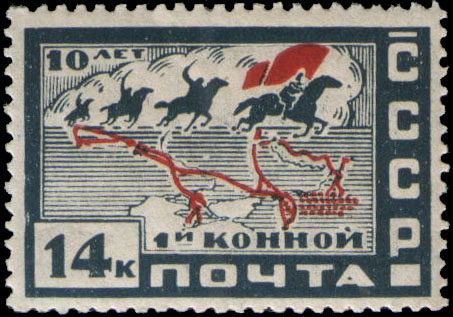
1930 stamp commemorating the 1st Cavalry Army, with a map showing their campaigns in Central Asia, Poland, and Crimea.

The march of the 1st Cavalry Army became popular after the Russian Civil War and was celebrated in a song, We are the Red Cavalry (Russian: Мы красная кавалерия). Other titles of the song were "Мы красные кавалеристы" (We, Red cavalrymen) and "[Марш Буденного]" (Budyonny march), and "Марш красных конников" (March of the Red horsemen).

In commemoration, a monument to the 1st Cavalry Army was built in Lviv Oblast, Ukraine.

== Notable figures ==
- Semyon Budyonny.
- Kliment Voroshilov.
- Georgy Zhukov, Soviet military commander, famous for his role in World War II.
- Grigory Kulik, Soviet military commander.
- Semyon Timoshenko, Soviet military commander.
- Andrei Grechko, Soviet military commander.
- Efim Shchadenko, Soviet military commander.
- Alexander Parkhomenko, Soviet military commander
- Andrei Bubnov, Soviet military commander.
- Isaac Babel, journalist and writer, who wrote the 1920 Diary and the book Red Cavalry based on his experiences.
- Vadim Yakovlev, yesaul.
- Grigori Maslakov, Soviet military commander, who later defected to the Makhnovists.
- Pavlina Kuznetsov, female tachanka gunner in the 6th Division.
