= Volodarka =

Rural locality in Kyiv Oblast, Ukraine

Volodarka Володарка
- Rural settlement
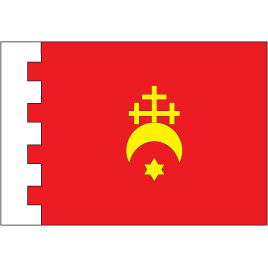
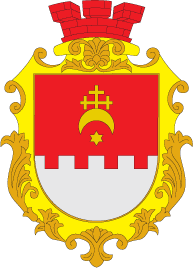
- Flag Coat of arms

- Location within Kyiv Oblast Location within Ukraine
- Coordinates: 49.52°N 29.9153°E
- Country: Ukraine
- Oblast: Kyiv Oblast
- Raion: Bila Tserkva Raion

Population
  - Estimate (2022): 5,708
- Time zone: UTC+2 (EET)
  - Summer (DST): UTC+3 (EEST)
- Postal Code: 09301

Volodarka (Ukrainian: Володарка, Polish: Wołodarka) is a rural settlement located on the Ros River in Bila Tserkva Raion, Kyiv Oblast (region) of Ukraine. The town is about 20 miles SSW of the city of Bila Tserkva. It hosts the administration of Volodarka settlement hromada, one of the hromadas of Ukraine. Population: 5,708 (2022 estimate). In 2001, the population was 7,639.

== History ==
In 1900, there were 2,079 Jews living in Volodarka. Nearly all of the town's Jews were murdered in the Holocaust, including in a mass killing in the Volodarka town park, where they were forced to dig their own graves before being shot and buried there, in July 1941.

The Battle of Wołodarka took place nearby in May, 1920.

Until 18 July 2020, Volodarka was the administrative center of Volodarka Raion. The raion was abolished that day as part of the administrative reform of Ukraine, which reduced the number of raions of Kyiv Oblast to seven. The area of Volodarka Raion was merged into Bila Tserkva Raion.

Until 26 January 2024, Volodarka was designated urban-type settlement. On this day, a new law entered into force which abolished this status, and Volodarka became a rural settlement.
