= Hławiczka =

Hławiczka is a Polish surname. Notable people with the surname include:

- Andrzej Hławiczka (1866–1914), musicologist and educator
- Karol Hławiczka (1894–1976), composer, pianist and educator, son of Andrzej

== See also ==
- Hlawiczka (Czech surname)
- Hlaváček (Czech surname)
- Hlawka
- Hlavečník
