= Kiedroń =

Kiedroń (archaic feminine: Kiedroniowa) is a Polish surname. Notable people with the surname include:

- Józef Kiedroń (1879–1932), Polish mining engineer and politician
- Zofia Kirkor-Kiedroniowa (1872–1952), Polish activist
