= Evangelical Lutheran cemetery, Cieszyn =

Lutheran church operated cemetery in Cieszyn, Poland

Evangelical Cemetery of Cieszyn
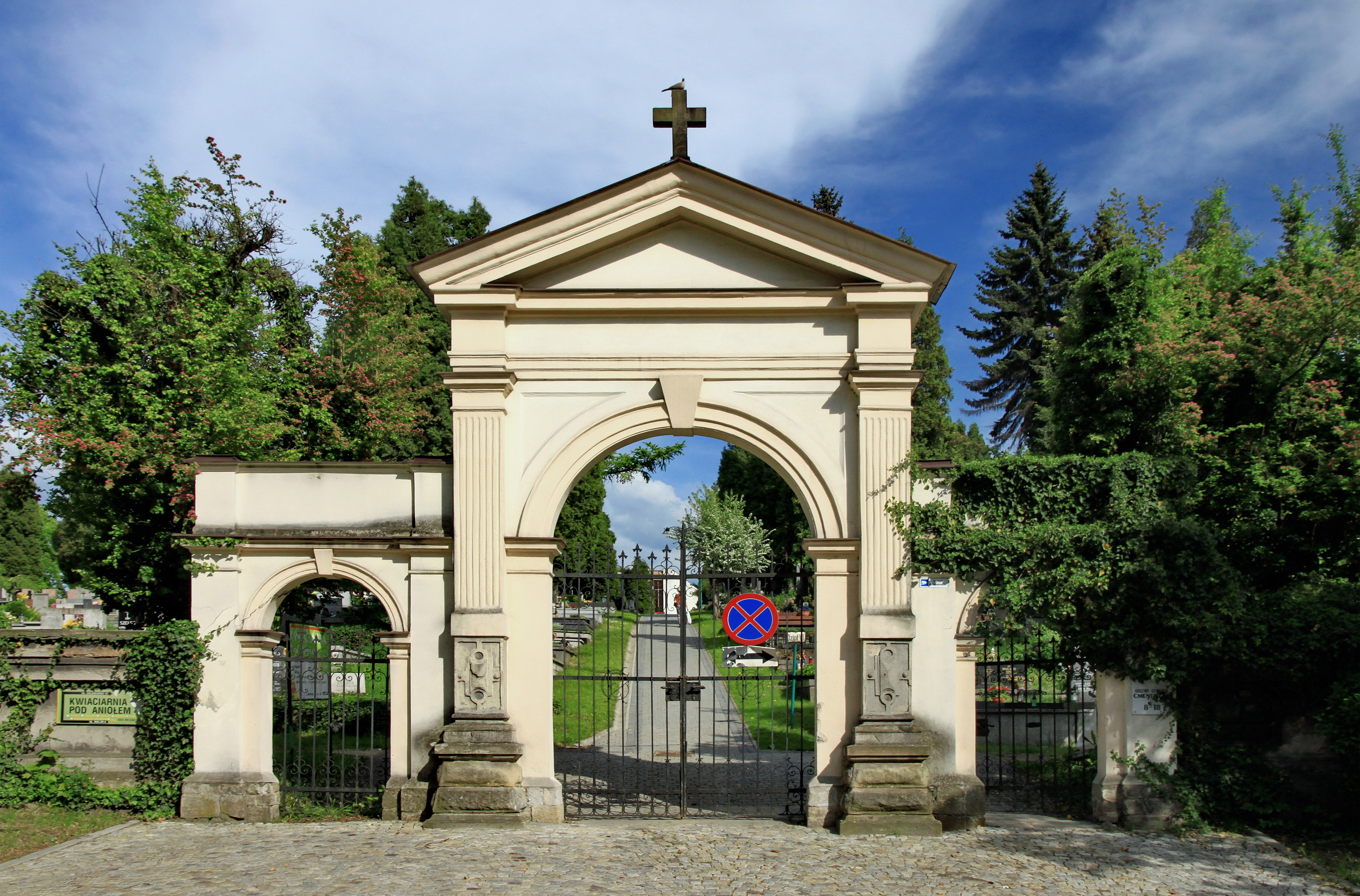
- The cemetery gates

Details
- Established: 1887
- Location: Cieszyn
- Country: Poland
- Coordinates: 49°44′52″N 18°38′36″E
- Type: Protestant cemetery
- Owned by: Evangelical Church of the Augsburg Confession in Poland
- Website: https://www.cieszyn.luteranie.pl

The Evangelical Lutheran Cemetery of the Augsburg Confession in Cieszyn (Polish: Cmentarz ewangelicki w Cieszynie) is a historic Lutheran Protestant cemetery located in Cieszyn, Poland.

== History ==
The new Lutheran cemetery on Bielska Street, east of the old town was established in 1887 on the city limits of Bobrek when the Old Evangelical Cemetery at the Jesus Church became inadequate to cope with mortality rates. The cemetery is divided into 6 quarters which was divided into individual sections and plots which can be seen on an electronic map. The cemetery was declared a protected object of cultural heritage on 11 July 1986.

== Gallery ==
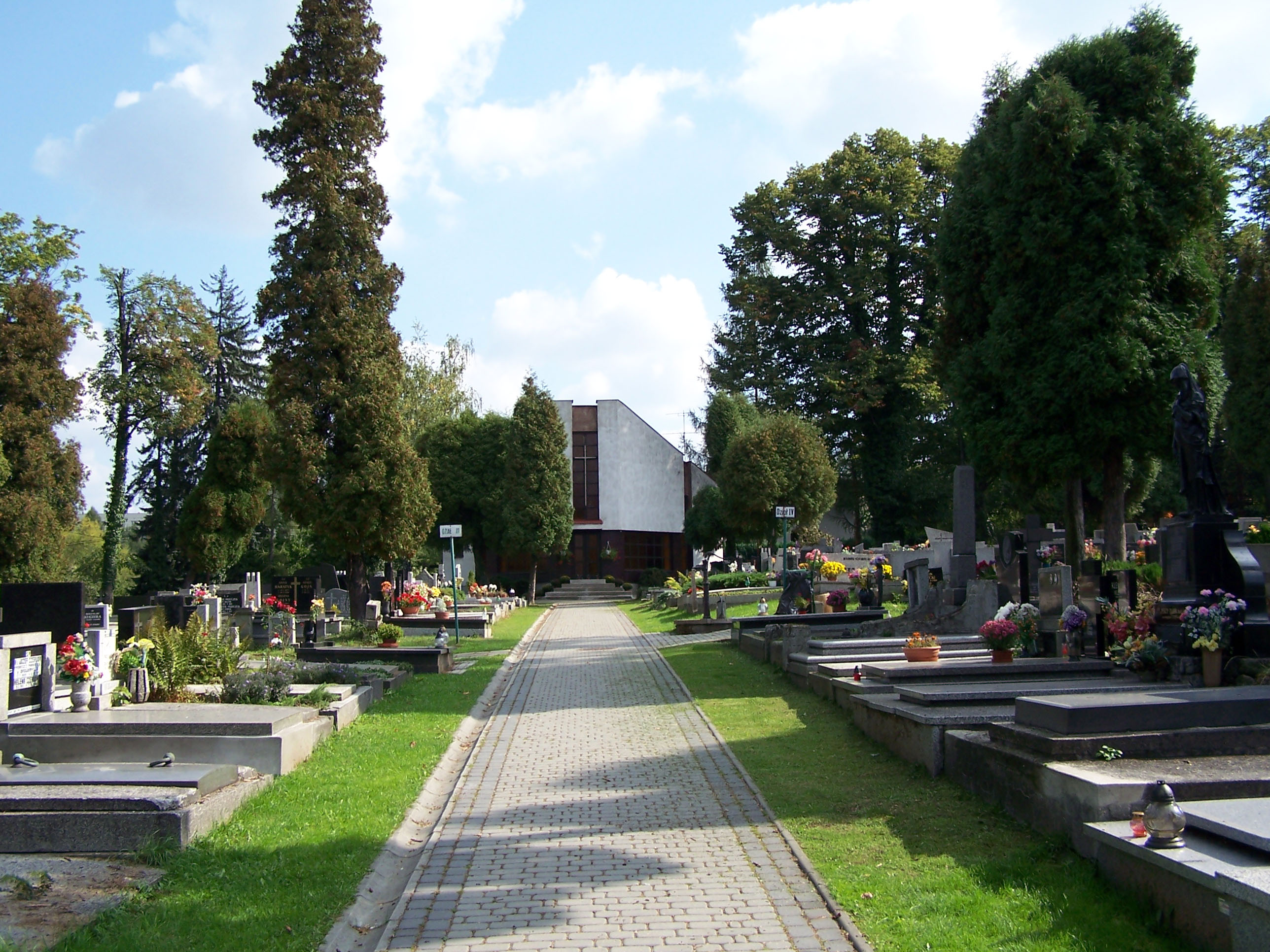
The general view of the cemetery

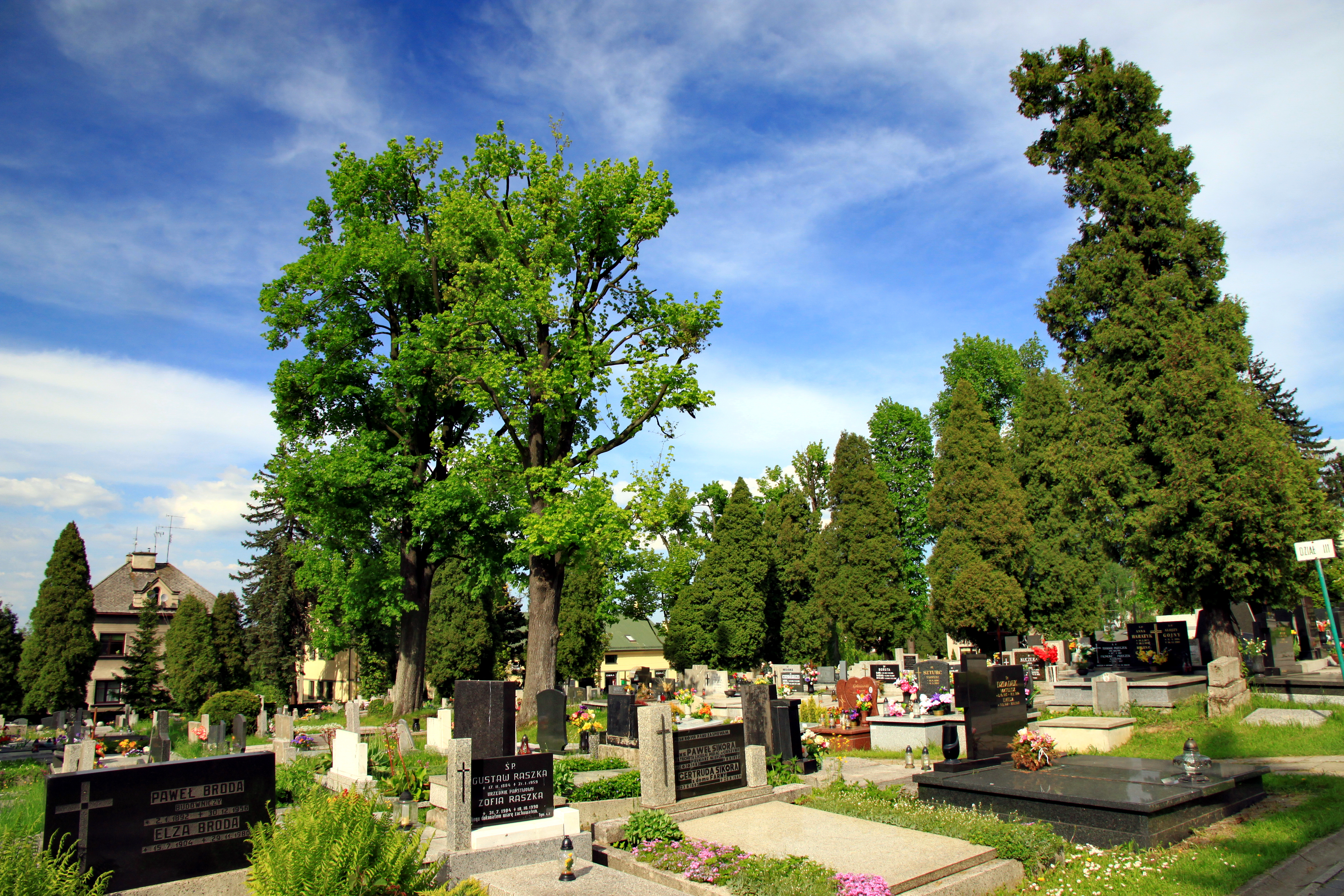

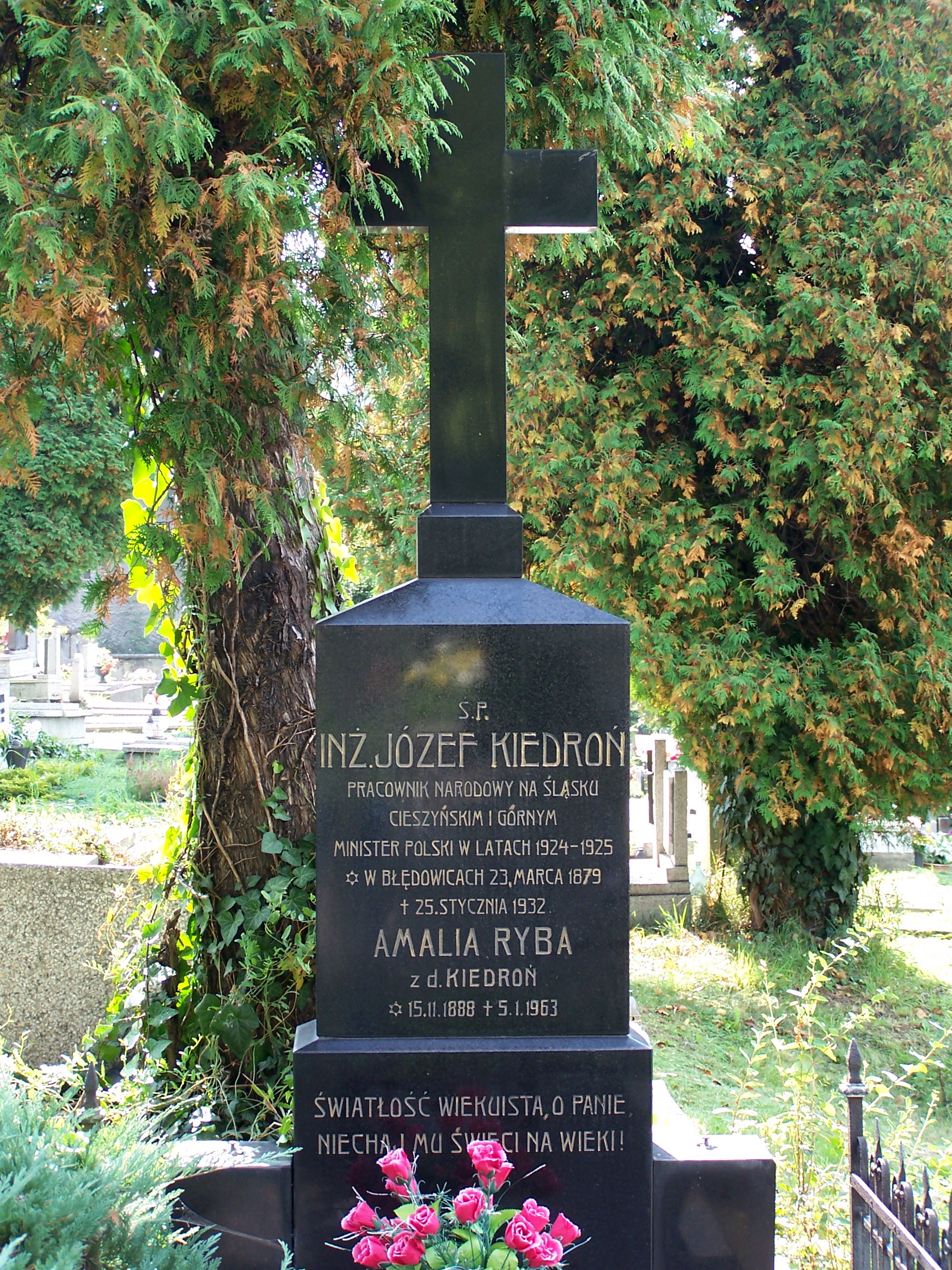
The grave monument of Józef Kiedroń

== Notable burials ==
- Andrzej Hławiczka (1866–1914), Polish musicologist, ethnographer and one of leaders of spiritual revival of Lutheran church in Cieszyn Silesia.
- Józef Kiedroń (1879–1932), Polish mining engineer and politician.
- Paweł Hulka-Laskowski (1881–1946), Polish writer and journalist.
- Karol Hławiczka (1894–1976), Polish composer, pianist, teacher and Chopinologist, son of Andrzej Hławiczka .
- Karol Stryja (1915–1998), Polish conductor and teacher.

== See also ==
- Evangelical-Augsburg Church in Poland
- Jesus Church, Cieszyn
