= Hlaváček =

Hlaváček (feminine: Hlaváčková) is a Czech surname, a diminutive form of Hlaváč. Notable people with the surname include:

- Andrea Hlaváčková (born 1986), Czech tennis player
- Běla Hlaváčková (born 1976), Czech Paralympic swimmer
- Evan Hlavacek (born 1974), American football player
- Ilona Hlaváčková (born 1977), Czech swimmer
- Jana Hlaváčková (born 1981), Czech tennis player
- Jitka Hlaváčková, Czech figure skater
- Joseph F. Hlavacek (1921–1982), American painter
- Karel Hlaváček (1874–1898), Czech poet
- Ladislav Hlaváček (1925–2014), Czech footballer
- Leoš Hlaváček (born 1963), Czech sport shooter
- Martin Hlaváček (born 1980), Czech politician
- Michaela Hlaváčková (born 1989), Slovak model
- Oldo Hlaváček (1934–2025), Slovak actor and screenwriter
- Petr Hlaváček (1950–2014), Czech footwear researcher
