= Ministry of Religious Affairs and Public Education (Poland) =

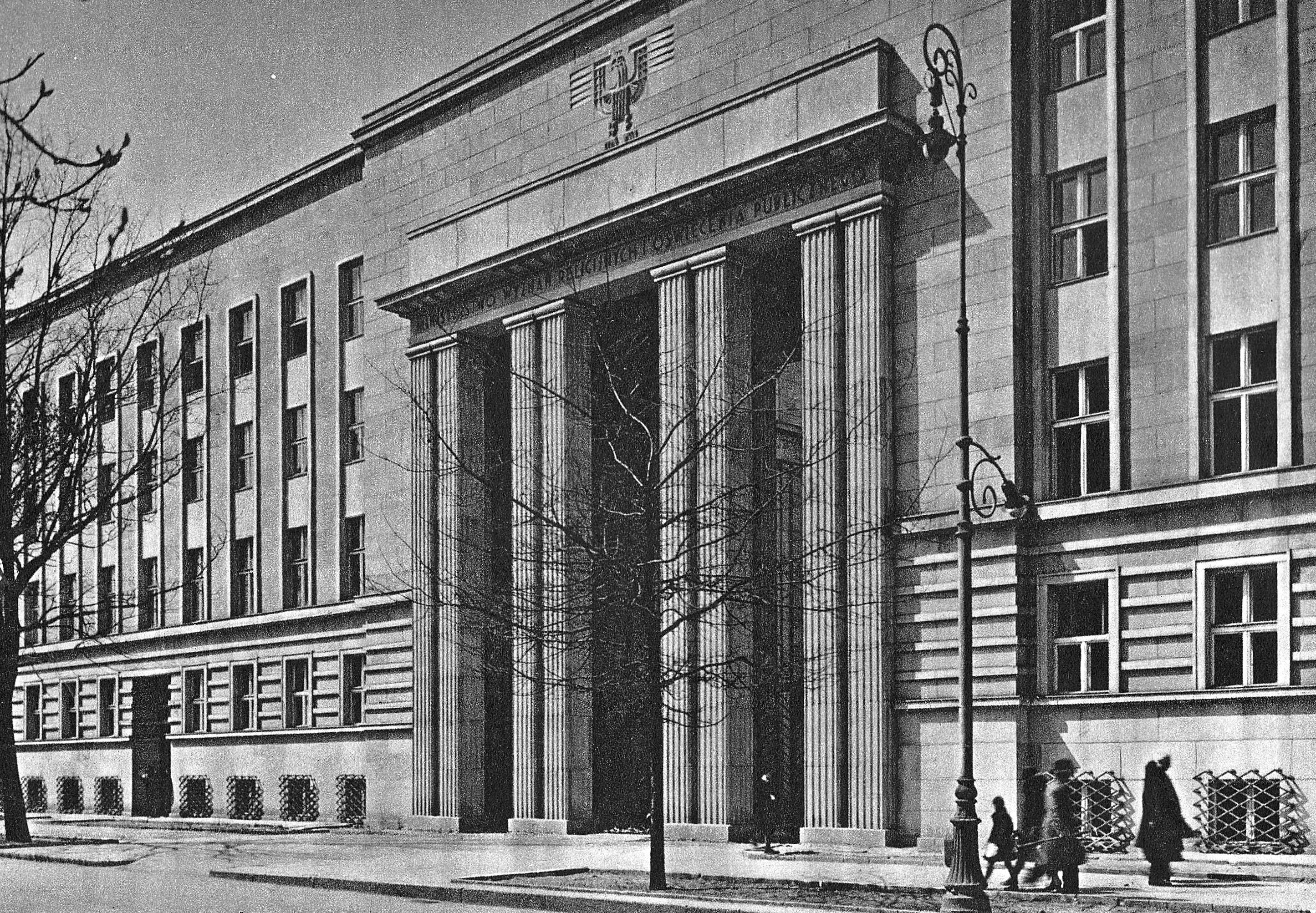
Ministry of Religious Affairs and Public Education, al. J.Ch. Szucha 25

The Ministry of Religious Affairs and Public Education (Polish: Ministerstwo Wyznań Religijnych i Oświecenia Publicznego) was a Polish ministry that existed in the years 1918-1939. Following World War II, it was superseded by the Ministry of National Education.

== Ministers ==
1917–1918. Antoni Ponikowski
1918–1919. Ksawery Prauss.
1919. Jan Łukasiewicz
1919–1920. Tadeusz Łopuszański.
1920–1921. Maciej Rataj.
1921–1922. Antoni Ponikowski.
1922. Julian Nowak.
1922. Kazimierz Władysław Kumaniecki.
1922–1923. Józef Mikułowski-Pomorski.
1923. Stanisław Głąbiński.
1923. Stanisław Grabski
1923–1924. Bolesław Miklaszewski.
1924–1925. Jan Zawidzki
1925–1926. Stanisław Grabski.
1926. Józef Mikułowski-Pomorski.
1926. Antoni Sujkowski.
1926–1927. Kazimierz Bartel.
1927–1928. Gustaw Dobrucki.
1928–1929. Kazimierz Świtalski.
1929–1931. Sławomir Czerwiński.
1931–1934. Janusz Jędrzejewicz.
1934–1935. Wacław Jędrzejewicz.
1935. Konstanty Chyliński
1935–1939. Wojciech Alojzy Świętosławski.
