= Józef Kiedroń =

Polish politician (1879–1932)

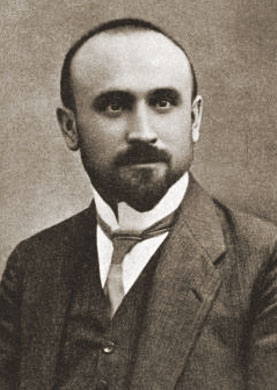
- Józef Kiedroń

Minister of Industry and Trade of Poland
- In office 17 December 1923 – 16 May 1925
- Prime Minister: Władysław Grabski
- Preceded by: Marian Szydłowski
- Succeeded by: Czesław Klarner

Personal details
- Born: 23 March 1879 Błędowice Dolne, Austria-Hungary
- Died: 25 January 1932 (aged 52) Berlin, Weimar Germany
- Resting place: Evangelical Lutheran cemetery, Cieszyn
- Spouse: Zofia Kirkor-Kiedroniowa
- Occupation: Mining engineer

Józef Kiedroń (23 March 1879 – 25 January 1932) was a Polish mining engineer and politician.

== Biography ==
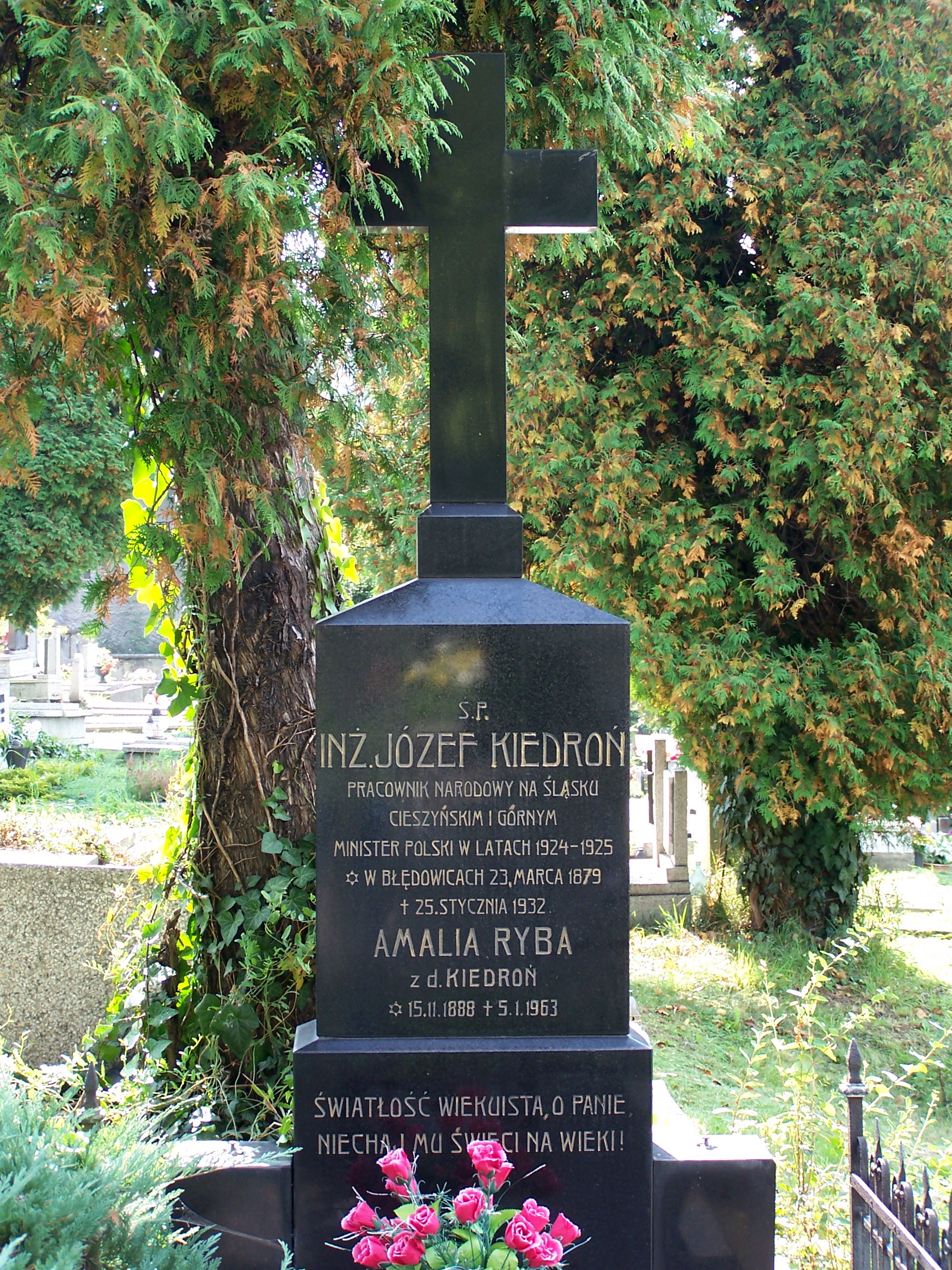
Grave of Józef Kiedroń at the Protestant cemetery in Cieszyn

Kiedroń was born to a peasant's family. Kiedroń graduated from a school in Cieszyn and then studied at the Lwów Polytechnic. In 1902 he graduated from a Coal Mining Academy in Leoben. Kiedroń worked as a director of two coal mines in Dąbrowa and was active in trade unions as well as in the Polish cultural and educational organizations. He had merit in establishment of Polish primary schools in the area, mining school in Doubrava and the Juliusz Słowacki Polish Grammar School in Orłowa. On 1 August 1905 he married Zofia Kirkor-Kiedroniowa, Polish activist and sister of noted politicians Stanisław and Władysław Grabski. Together with his wife he cooperated with Polskie Zjednoczenie Narodowe (Polish National Unity) political organization in Cieszyn Silesia of right-wing character. In 1918 Kiedroń prepared manifesto of the Rada Narodowa Księstwa Cieszyńskego (National Council of the Duchy of Cieszyn), a local Polish self-government council working to join Cieszyn Silesia to Poland.

In 1920, Cieszyn Silesia was divided between Poland and Czechoslovakia by the decision of Spa Conference, in which Kiedroń was present as a Polish delegate. His hometown and the workplace fell to Czechoslovakia and Kiedroń left the Trans-Olza area, as he was an active pro-Polish activist; and stayed in Poland, where worked in Upper Silesia and Warsaw. In 1923-1925 he was the Minister of Industry and Trade in the government of Władysław Grabski.

Kiedroń died on 25 January 1932 in Berlin and is buried at a Protestant cemetery in Cieszyn.

He has been awarded the Commander's Cross of the Order of Polonia Restituta (2 May 1923).

Government offices
Preceded by Marian Szydłowski	Minister of Industry and Trade of Poland; 1923–1925	Succeeded by Czesław Klarner
