= Hermanice, Ustroń =

District of Ustroń, Silesian Voivodeship, Poland

Coordinates: 49°44′25″N 18°47′58.5″E

Hermanice
- Osiedle
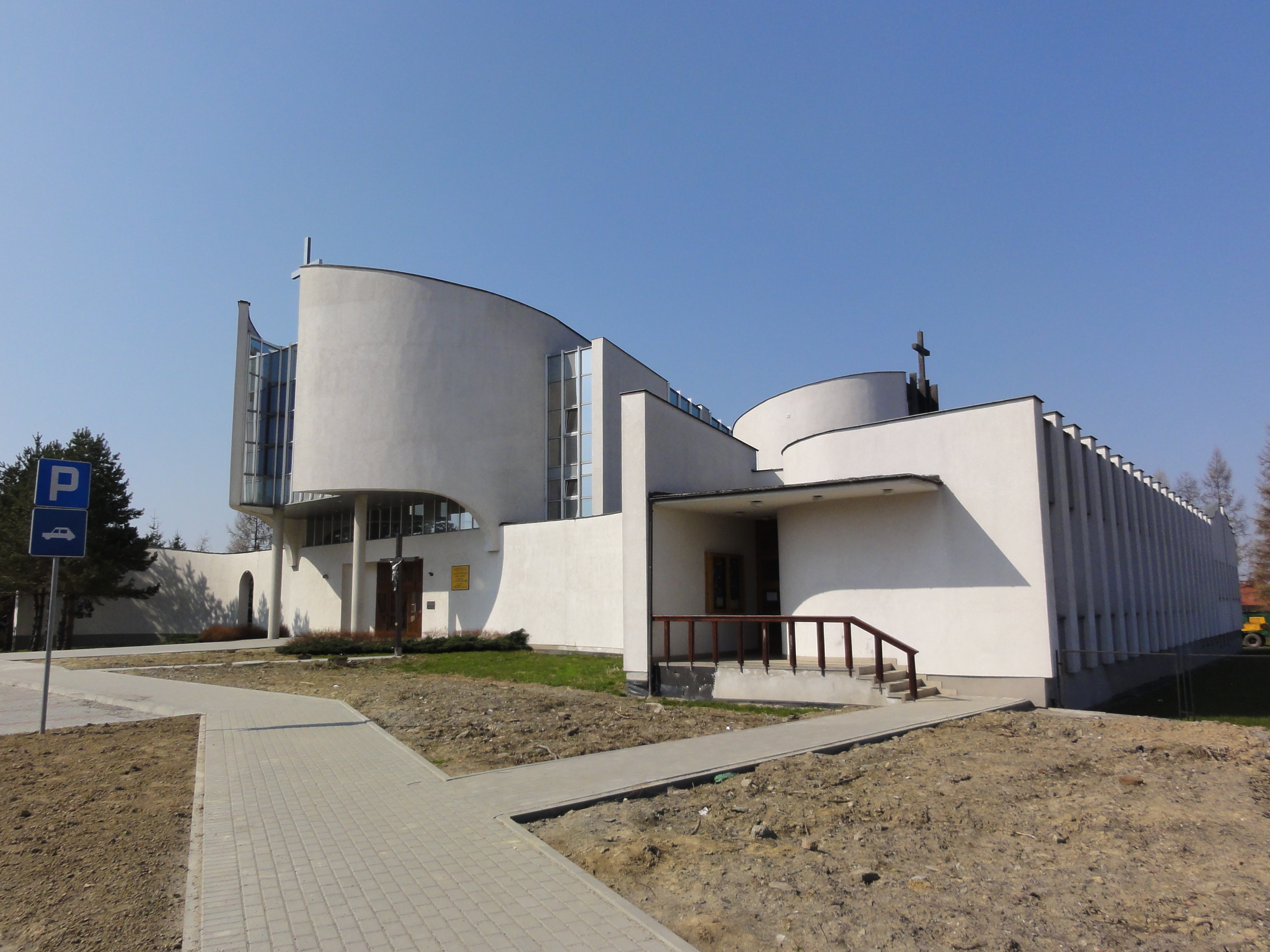
- Saint Mary Queen of Poland in Hermanice
- Interactive map of Hermanice
- Country: Poland
- Voivodeship: Silesian
- County: Cieszyn
- Town: Ustroń

Hermanice is an osiedle of Ustroń, Silesian Voivodeship, Poland. It was a separate municipality, but became administratively a part of Ustroń in 1945.

== History ==
The village was first mentioned in 1484, when it belonged to the Duchy of Teschen, a fee of the Kingdom of Bohemia. After 1526 it became part of the Habsburg monarchy.

In 1837, a paper mill was moved here from Ustroń. In the 1870s, a housing estate was built here to accommodate 80 families of workers of a forge in nearby Ustroń.

After Revolutions of 1848 in the Austrian Empire a modern municipal division was introduced in the re-established Austrian Silesia. The village as a municipality was subscribed to the political district of Bielsko and the legal district of Skoczów. According to the censuses conducted in 1880, 1890, 1900 and 1910 the population of the municipality grew from 749 in 1880 to 917 in 1910, with a growing majority of the inhabitants being native Polish-speakers (85.5% in 1880 and 94.9% in 1910) and dwindling minority German-speaking (11.5% in 1880 and 5.1% in 1910) and Czech-speaking (22 or 3% in 1880 and zero since 1900), with a majority of Protestants (54.7% in 1910), followed by Roman Catholics (44.8% in 1910) and Jews (5 people). The village was also traditionally inhabited by Cieszyn Vlachs, speaking the Cieszyn Silesian dialect.

After World War I, fall of Austria-Hungary, Polish–Czechoslovak War and the division of Cieszyn Silesia in 1920, it became a part of Poland. It was then annexed by Nazi Germany at the beginning of World War II. After the war it was restored to Poland.
