= Borów, Łowicz County =

Borów
- Village
- Location within Poland
- Coordinates: 52°5′N 19°35′E
- Country: Poland
- Voivodeship: Łódź
- County: Łowicz
- Gmina: Bielawy
- Population (approx.): 350

Borów [ˈbɔruf] is a village in the administrative district of Gmina Bielawy, within Łowicz County, Łódź Voivodeship, in central Poland.

The village has an approximate population of 350.

The manor of the Grabski family, where the politicians of the Second Polish Republic Władysław Grabski, Stanisław Grabski and Zofia Kirkor-Kiedroniowa were born, is located there.
