= Paweł Hulka-Laskowski =

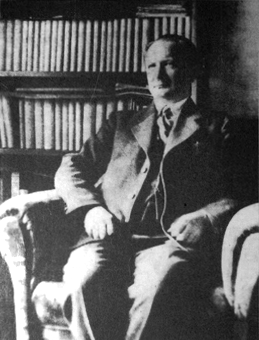
Paweł Hulka-Laskowski

Paweł Hulka-Laskowski (25 June 1881 – 29 October 1946) was a Polish writer, translator, journalist and social worker.

He was born in Żyrardów in working class, Protestant family of Czech ancestry. His parents were textile factory workers. In 1903 he enrolled to the University of Heidelberg. After his return to Poland, he settled with his wife Kazimiera and daughter Elżbieta in Grodzisk Mazowiecki. In June 1910 Hulka-Laskowski and his wife were arrested by Tsarist Russian authorities, being accused on complicity in the assassination attempt of a local Russian gendarmerie commander. After their release from prison they moved to Żyrardów.

In the interwar period, Hulka-Laskowski contributed to many newspapers and magazines, such as Bluszcz, Echo Literacko-Artystyczne, Sfinks, Myśl Niepodległa, Wiadomości Literackie and Jednota. He was a prolific translator, translating i.a. the works of Karel Čapek, Božena Němcová, Jonathan Swift, James Fenimore Cooper, Dmitry Merezhkovsky, Ernst Kretschmer, Emil Ludwig and Roger Martin du Gard. He is most known for the Polish translation of Jaroslav Hašek's The Good Soldier Švejk.

He died in a hospital in Cieszyn from a brain stroke, and was buried at the Evangelical Lutheran cemetery, Cieszyn.

== Works ==
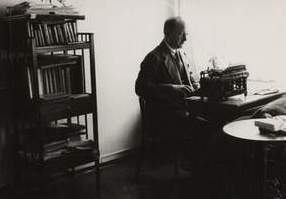
Hulka-Laskowski at work

- 1927 Porucznik Regier (Lieutenant Regier)
- 1934 Mój Żyrardów (My Żyrardów)
- 1938 Śląsk za Olzą (Silesia Behind Olza)
- 1946 Księżyc nad Cieszynem (Moon over Cieszyn)
