= Jan Szwarc =

Polish politician (born 1946)

member of Sejm 2005-2007
- In office 19 October 2001 – 4 November 2007

Personal details
- Born: 8 July 1946 (age 79) Ustroń, Poland
- Party: Democratic Left Alliance

Jan Szwarc (born 8 July 1946 in Ustroń) is a Polish politician. He was elected to Sejm on 25 September 2005, getting 7642 votes in 27 Bielsko-Biała district as a candidate from Democratic Left Alliance list.

He was also a member of Sejm 2001-2005.

== See also ==
- Members of Polish Sejm 2005-2007
