= Karol Stryja =

Polish conductor (1915–1998)

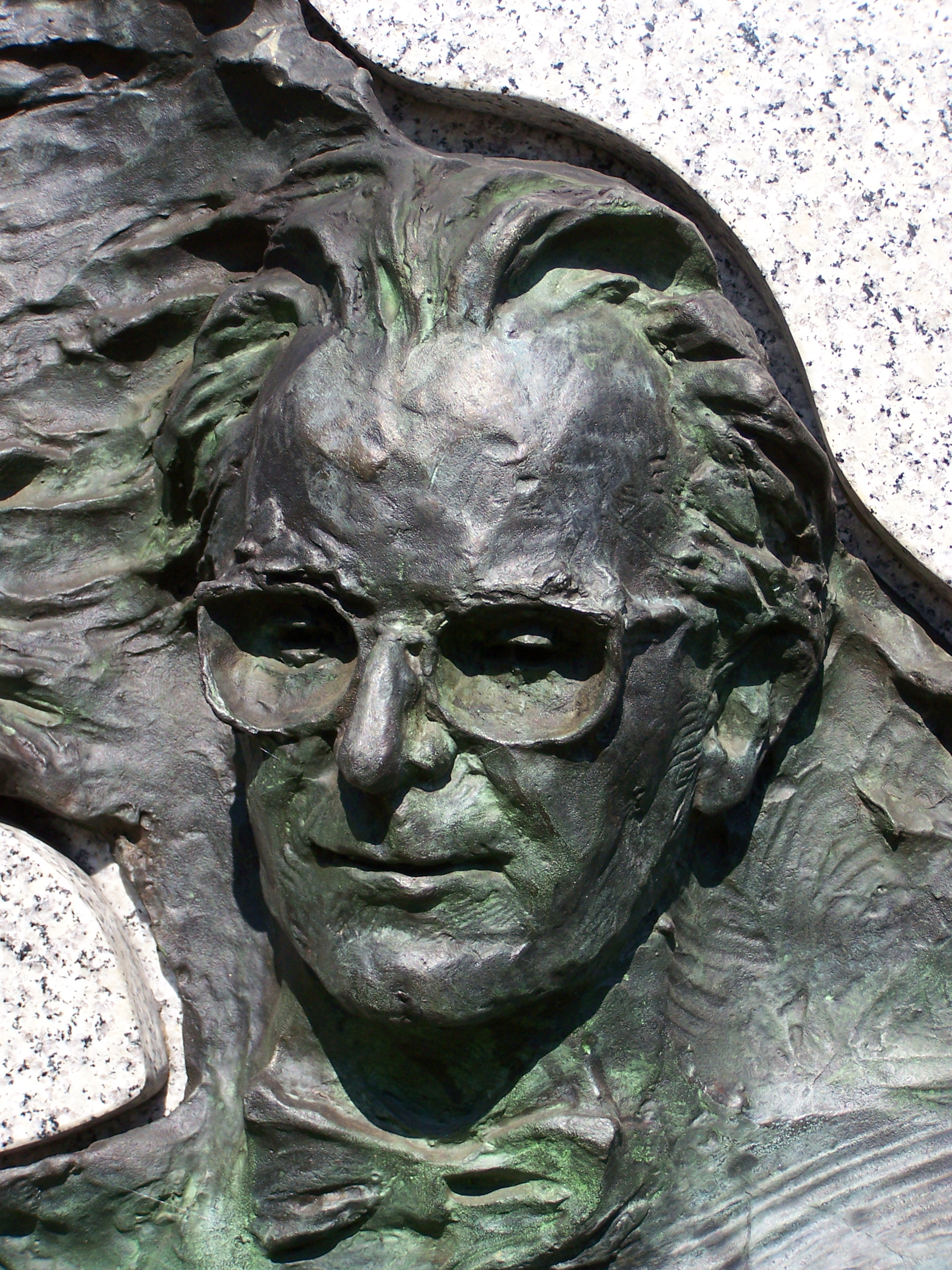
- Bust of Karol Stryja at the Grunwald Square in Katowice
- Born: 2 February 1915; Cieszyn, Austria-Hungary
- Died: 31 January 1998 (aged 82); Katowice, Poland
- Education: University of Music in Katowice
- Occupations: Conductor; educator

Karol Stryja (2 February 1915 in Cieszyn – 31 January 1998 in Katowice) was a Polish conductor and teacher.

Stryja, son of a tailor, was born in Cieszyn and finished elementary school, gymnasium and teachers' seminary there. Since 1934 he worked as a teacher and simultaneously studied at the University of Music in Katowice. In 1939 he graduated from the Department of Pedagogy, in 1951 from the studies in conducting.

In 1937 he started his conducting career with the Echo choir in Łaziska Górne. Stryja later worked at the Silesian Philharmonic in Katowice, where he became the art director and conductor in 1953. From 1968 to 1983 he was the art director of the Odense Symfoniorkester in Odense, Denmark. With the Silesian Philharmonic, Odense Symfoniorkester and other orchestras, Stryja toured many European countries, as well as the United States, Argentina, Israel, Japan and Cuba. He also conducted at various international music festivals. Stryja also taught conducting in Katowice.

In 1979 Stryja founded the Grzegorz Fitelberg International Competition for Conductors in Katowice, in 1980 he founded the Carl Nielsen International Violin Competition in Odense.

In 1984 he was given the academic title of professor. In March 1995 he was awarded Grand Cross of the Order of Polonia Restituta by the President Lech Wałęsa. K. Stryja was also awarded Order of Cyril and Methodius 1st Class (communist Bulgaria). Karol Stryja died on 31 January 1998 in Katowice and is interred at the Evangelical Lutheran cemetery, Cieszyn .
