= Leopold Skulski =

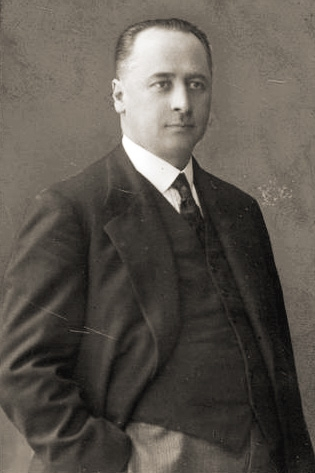
- Leopold Skulski

Prime Minister of Poland
- In office 13 December 1919 – 9 June 1920
- Chief of State: Józef Piłsudski
- Preceded by: Ignacy Paderewski
- Succeeded by: Władysław Grabski

Minister of Internal Affairs
- In office 24 July 1920 – 28 June 1921
- Prime Minister: Władysław Grabski; Wincenty Witos
- Preceded by: Józef Kuczyński
- Succeeded by: Władysław Raczkiewicz

Personal details
- Born: 15 November 1878 Zamość, Lublin Governorate, Congress Kingdom of Poland, Russian Empire
- Died: 11 June 1940 (aged 61) Brest, Soviet Union
- Party: Polish People's Party "Piast"
- Occupation: Politician, chemist

Leopold Skulski pronounced [lɛˈɔpɔlt ˈskulskʲi]; (15 November 1878, Zamość – Brest, 11 June 1940) served as prime minister of Poland for six months from 13 December 1919 until 9 June 1920 in the interim Legislative Sejm during the formation of sovereign Second Polish Republic following World War I.

== Early life ==
He began his education in a gymnasium in Zamość in 1891. During his time in fifth grade, he began to work in a pharmacy in Zamość. On 21 December 1894 when he passed his exams in Latin, Russian, German and arithmetic as well as being able to write. For passing these exams he was issued the title of pharmacy student from the Lublin Governorate Medical Department. After receiving the title of pharmacy student he became an intern in pharmacies in Lublin and Krasnystaw from 1894 to 1897.

After completing his internships in January 1898 he left for Warsaw where he completedPharmaceutical courses in the Imperial University of Warsaw. After completing the course he became a pharmacy assistant.

== National politics ==
Skulski was involved in politics from at least the mid 1910s, and served as mayor of Łódź between 1917 and 1919. During the rebirth of sovereign Poland, he was active in the conservative Zjednoczenie Narodowe, representing the interests of landowners from Liga Narodowa.

=== Member of the Sejm ===
He became a deputy in the Polish parliament (Sejm) after the 1919 elections from the parliamentary wing of Narodowe Zjednoczenie Ludowe (NZL) which split from Zwiazek Ludowo Narodowy (ZLN) under his leadership.

He was regarded as a highly influential Member of the Sejm which led to him being considered for Minister of Internal Affairs in the government of Ignacy Jan Paderewski. Though he did not receive the appointment due to the supporters of Józef Piłsudski opposing his appointment to the post which led him to nominating himself for the post of Prime Minister of Poland.

=== Prime Minister of Poland (1919-1920) ===
On 13 December 1919, he became the Prime Minister of Poland. His government resigned on 9 June 1920, in the aftermath of the failure of the Kiev offensive and the success of the Bolshevik counteroffensive, in as much as the constitutional impasse resulting from the split of PSL "Wyzwolenie".

During Skulski's time as Prime Minister his government supported the position of Chief of State Józef Piłsudski in the Polish–Soviet War who was in favour of continuing the war with Soviet Russia. The Polish Socialist Party which was in the opposition in the Sejm was against continuing the war. The Sejm was also opposed to the draft laws presented by the government regarding the sequestration of the crops which eventually led to his resignation as prime minister.

Skulski resigned at the beginning of the Soviet counteroffensive to the Polish Kiev offensive which eventually led to Polish soldiers being pushed back to the outskirts of Warsaw.

=== Minister of Internal Affairs (1920-1921) ===
Skulski was also the Minister of Internal Affairs under the government of Wincenty Witos (from 24 July 1920 to 28 June 1921).

== Later life ==
He was a member of the State Tribunal of Poland from 1925. President of the Polish Radio in the 1930s, he did not take an active role in political life in the last decade of his life.

== Death ==
During the Invasion of Poland he was arrested in Pińsk by the Soviet NKVD; shortly thereafter he died in the NKVD prison in Brest.

Political offices
Preceded by Ignacy Paderewski	Prime Minister of Poland; 1919–1920	Succeeded by Władysław Grabski
