= Hlaváč =

Hlaváč (feminine: Hlaváčová) is a Czech surname. Notable people with the surname include:

- Jan Hlaváč (born 1976), Czech ice hockey player
- Jana Hlaváčová (1938–2024), Czech actress
- Jana Galíková-Hlaváčová (born 1963), Czech orienteerer
- Miloslav Hlaváč (1893–1975), Czech sport shooter
- Vít Hlaváč (born 1997), Czech racewalker
- Yvette Tulip Hlaváčová (born 1975), Czech swimmer
