= Oldo Hlaváček =

Slovak actor (1934–2025)

- Born: 26 January 1934; Bratislava, Czechoslovakia
- Died: 17 August 2025 (aged 91); Bratislava, Slovakia
- Occupations: Actor, Screenwriter
- Children: Ivo Hlaváček; Michaela Hlaváčková

Oldo Hlaváček (26 January 1934 – 17 August 2025) was a Slovak actor and screenwriter.

== Early life and career ==
Hlaváček began performing in the theatre, and graduated from the Academy of Performing Arts in Bratislava. During his military service, actor Ivan Krajíček came across him when looking for a scriptwriter. The two formed a cabaret duo which would perform on radio and television. From 1971, the duo hosted the entertainment show Funnier Wins.

In 1957, he was imprisoned for one year for sedition against the republic.

In 1963 he became a member of the Drama Department of the Slovak National Theatre, where he would remain for the rest of his career.

In 2004, the President of Slovakia, Rudolf Schuster, awarded him the Cross of the President of the Slovak Republic of the Second Degree.

== Personal life and death ==
His son, Ivo Hlaváček and granddaughter Michaela Hlaváčková are both actors.

Oldo Hlaváček died on 17 August 2025, at the age of 91.
