= Ustroń =

Ustroń Ustrůńe
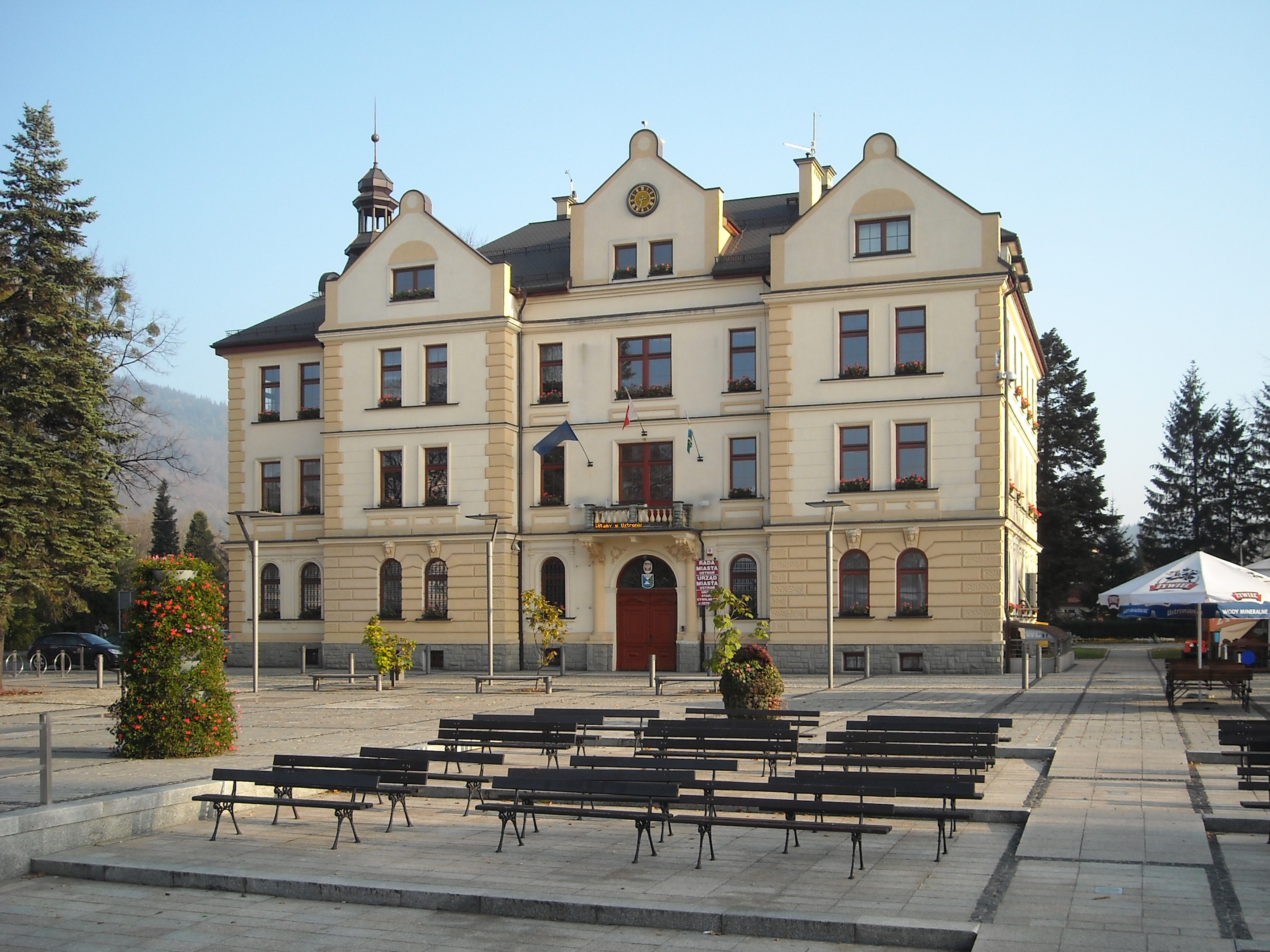
- Town Hall

- Flag Coat of arms

- Location within Poland
- Coordinates: 49°43′10″N 18°48′43″E
- Country: Poland
- Voivodeship: Silesian
- County: Cieszyn
- Gmina: Ustroń (urban gmina)
- First mentioned: 1305
- Town rights: 1956

Government
  - Mayor: Paweł Sztefek

Area
  - Total: 58.92 km^{2} (22.75 sq mi)

Population (2019-06-30)
  - Total: 16,073
  - Density: 272.8/km^{2} (706.5/sq mi)
- Time zone: UTC+1 (CET)
  - Summer (DST): UTC+2 (CEST)
- Postal code: 43-450
- Car plates: SCI
- Website: http://www.ustron.pl

Ustroń ([ˈustrɔɲ]; Silesian: Ustrůńe; German: Ustron) is a health resort town in Cieszyn Silesia, southern Poland, in the Silesian Voivodeship. It lies on the Silesian Beskids mountain range. The Równica and Czantoria mountains are nearby.

== History ==
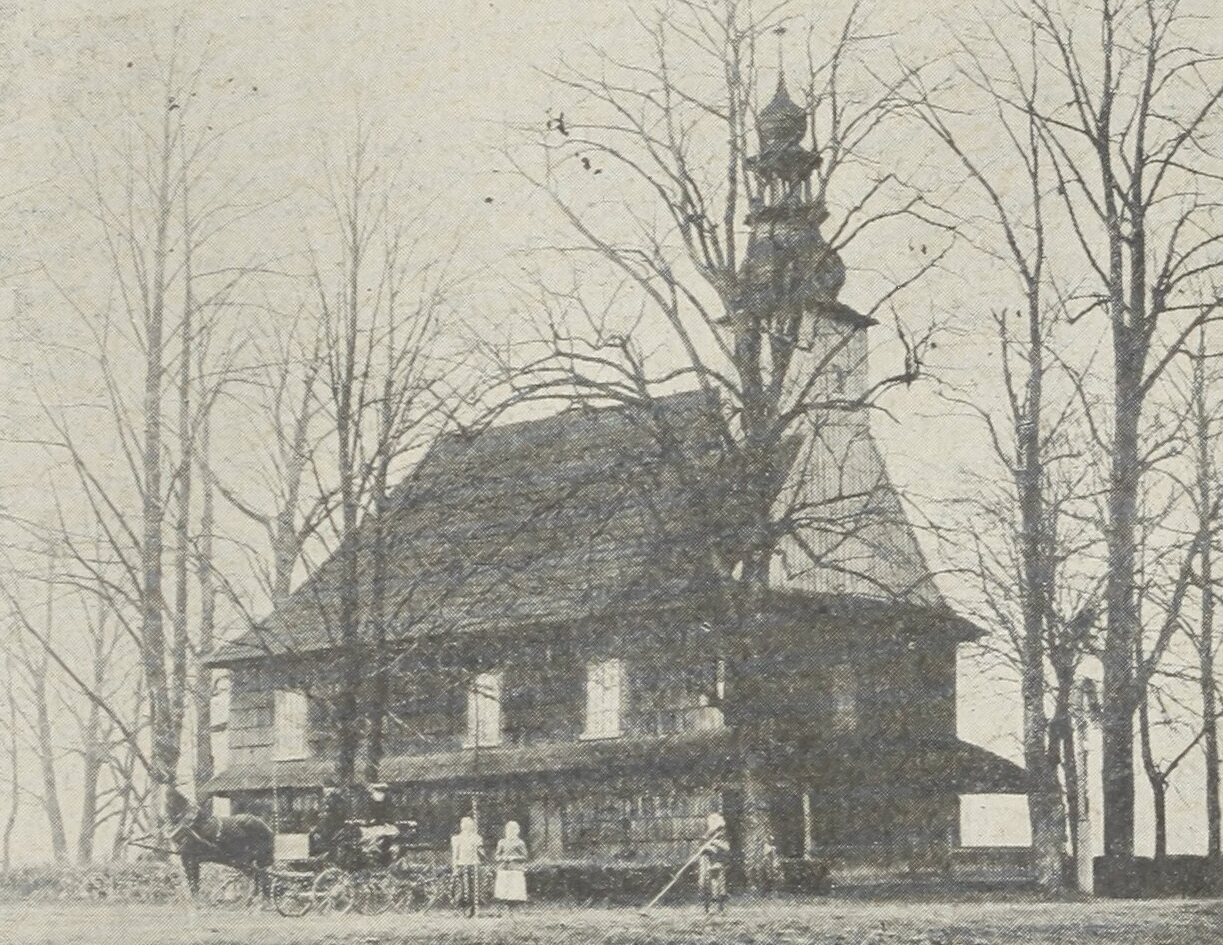
Saint Anne church, before 1932

The settlement was first mentioned in a Latin document of Diocese of Wrocław called Liber fundationis episcopatus Vratislaviensis from around 1305 as item in Ustrona. It meant that the village was in the process of location (the size of land to pay a tithe from was not yet precise). The creation of the village was a part of a larger settlement campaign taking place in the late 13th century in the area that would later be known as Upper Silesia.

Politically, the village belonged initially to the Duchy of Cieszyn, formed in 1290 in the process of feudal fragmentation of Poland, and was ruled by a local branch of Piast dynasty. In 1327, the duchy became a fee of Kingdom of Bohemia, which, after 1526, became part of the Habsburg monarchy.

The village became a seat of a Catholic parish, mentioned in the register of Peter's Pence payment from 1447 among the 50 parishes of Cieszyn deanery as Wstrowe.

In 1772, the Klemens Steel Works was opened and the village was gradually industrialised. When the steel work was closed in 1897 the market town switched to be more orientated towards a health and spa resort.

After the Revolutions of 1848 in the Austrian Empire, a modern municipal division was introduced in the re-established Austrian Silesia. Ustroń as a municipality was subscribed to the political district of Bielsko and the legal district of Skoczów. In 1856, it gained market town rights. According to the 1880–1910 censuses, the population of the municipality dropped from 4,375 in 1880 to 4,275 in 1910, with a majority being native Polish-speakers (91.5–92.8%), a growing minority speaking German, (Note: Population went from 267 or 6.2% in 1880 to 333 or 7.8% in 1910.) and dwindling Czech-speaking population. (Note: Population went from 99 or 2.3% in 1880 to 15 or 0.4% in 1910.) In terms of religion, in 1910, the majority were Protestants (57.1%), followed by Roman Catholics (40.4%) and Jews (2.5%). Ustroń was also traditionally inhabited by Cieszyn Vlachs, speaking Cieszyn Silesian dialect.

After World War I, the fall of Austria-Hungary, the Polish–Czechoslovak War and the division of Cieszyn Silesia in 1920, it became a part of Poland. According to the 1921 census, Ustroń had a population of 3,998, 95.45% Polish, 3.48% German, 0.75% Jewish and 0.3% Czech.

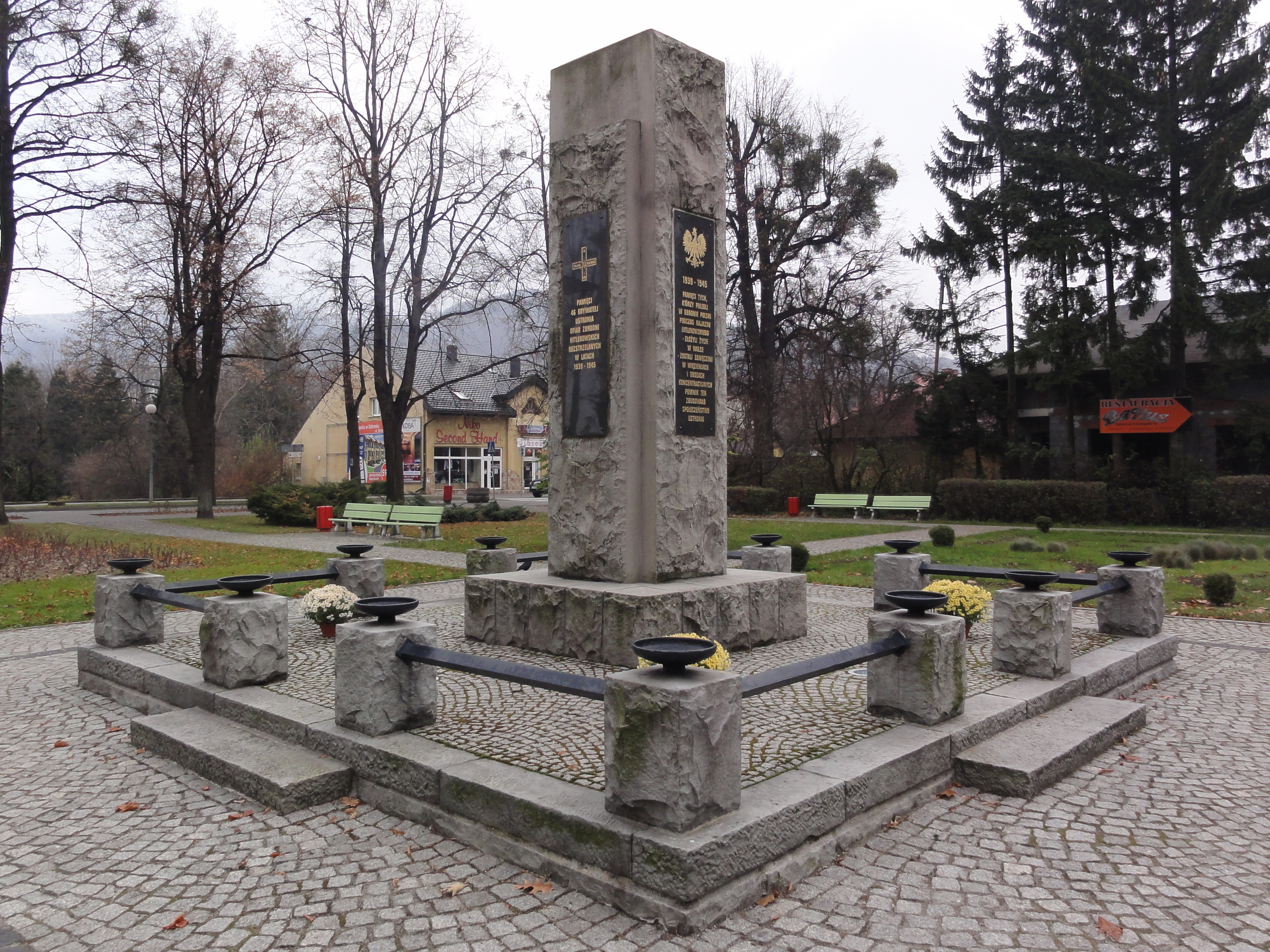
Memorial to local victims of World War II

It was then annexed by Nazi Germany at the beginning of World War II. After the war it was restored to Poland.

It gained town rights in 1956. Since the 1960s, Ustroń saw a large development of new hotels and health centers. A cluster of pyramid-shaped hotels were built in the town. It was also expanded by merger of the surrounding villages: Nierodzim in 1974, Hermanice and Lipowiec in 1975. It was administratively located in the Bielsko-Biała Voivodeship from 1975 to 1998.

Ustroń is the home of the Jan Jarocki Museum, which was founded in April 1986 as the Museum of Metallurgy. It is housed in an old building of the former Klemens Steel Works, which was in use between 1772 and 1897. The museum collects technical tools, as well as historical and ethnographic artifacts.

== Sport ==
- Kuźnia Ustroń – football club founded in 1922 and chess club in 2023
- TRS Siła Ustroń – volleyball club

== Hiking and recreation ==
Ustroń and the areas surrounding it play host to many hiking trails, including either the start (if one travels eastward) or finish (if one travels westward) of the Main Beskid Trail.

== Education ==
- The Alfred Meissner Graduated School of Dental Engineering and the Humanities

== Notable people ==
- Karol Hławiczka (1894–1976), composer and educator
- Theodor Kotschy (1813–1866), Austrian botanist
- Jan Szwarc (born 1946), politician

== Twin towns – sister cities ==
Ustroń is twinned with:

- Frenštát pod Radhoštěm, Czech Republic
- Hajdúnánás, Hungary
- Kalety, Poland
- Luhačovice, Czech Republic
- Neukirchen-Vluyn, Germany
- Piešťany, Slovakia
- Újbuda (Budapest), Hungary
- Ustronie Morskie, Poland

== Gallery ==
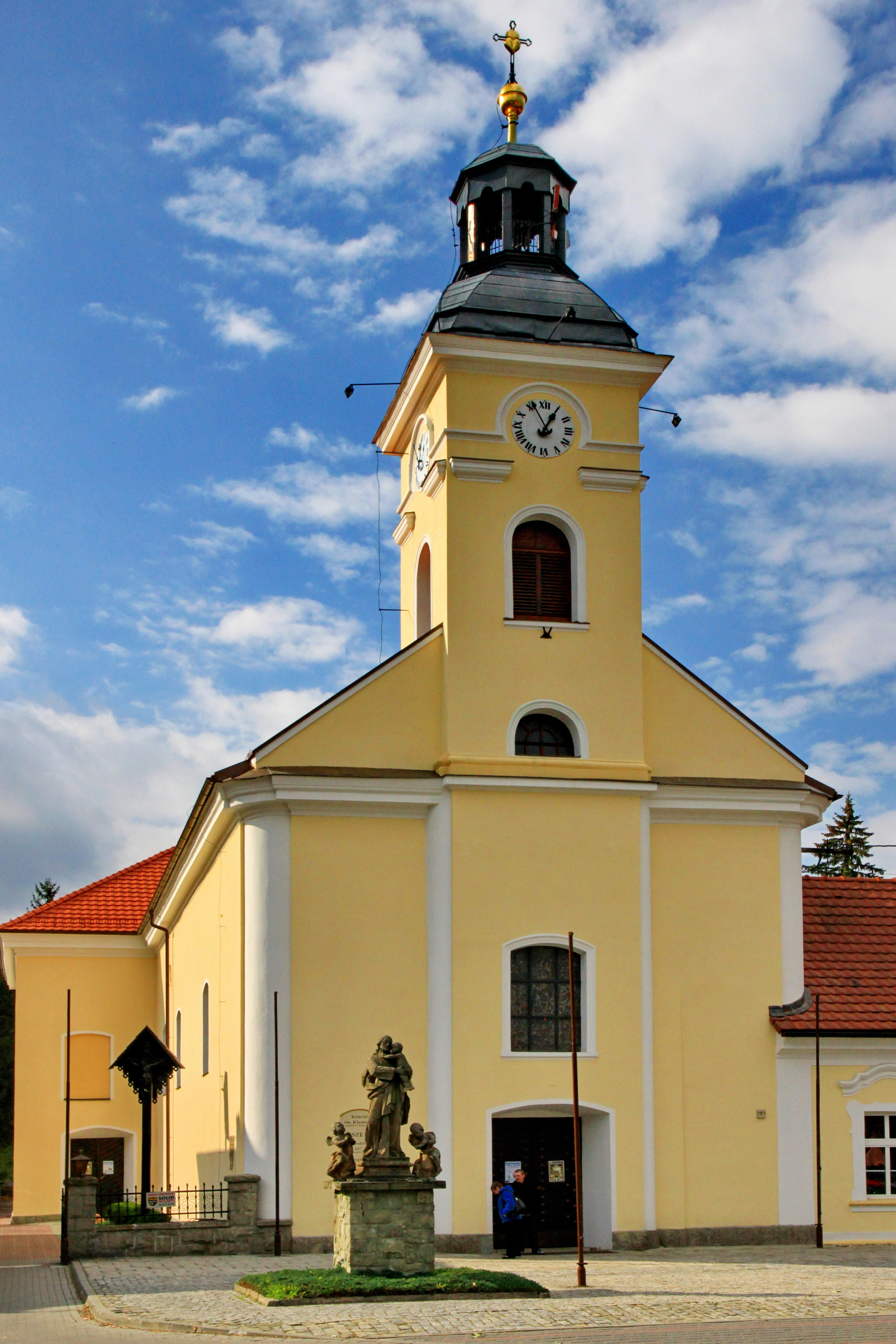
Catholic parish church of St. Klemens

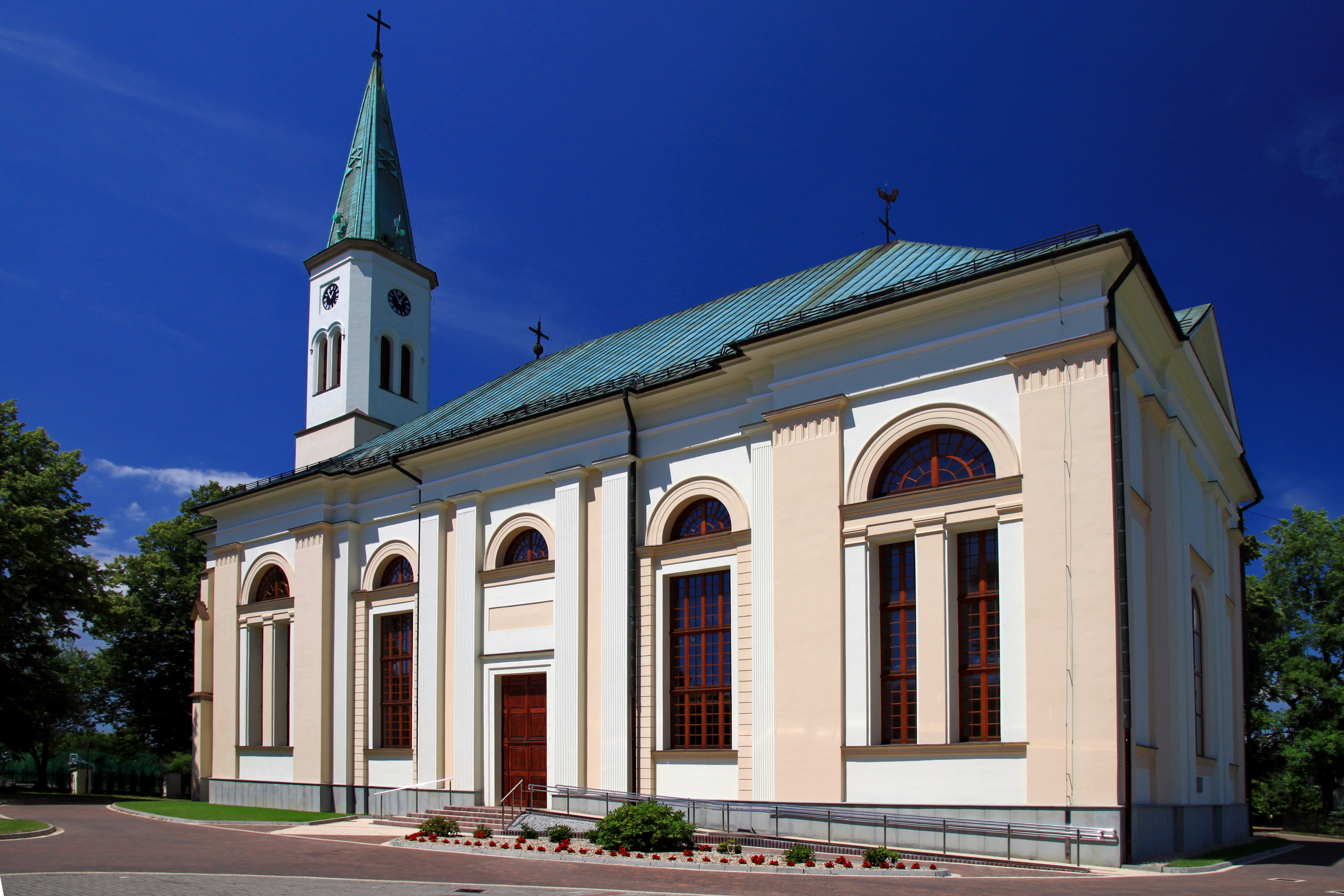
Lutheran church of the Apostle James
