= Stanisław Głąbiński =

Polish politician (1862–1941)

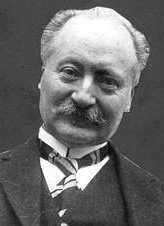

Minister of Foreign Affairs of the Kingdom of Poland in 1918

Personal details
- Born: 25 February 1862 Skole, Austrian Empire
- Died: 14 August 1941 (aged 79) Kharkiv, Ukrainian Soviet Socialist Republic
- Party: National Party
- Profession: Political scientist, Politician

Stanisław Głąbiński (25 February 1862 – 14 August 1941) was a Polish politician, academic, lawyer and writer who served in 1918 as the Minister of Foreign Affairs of the Kingdom of Poland.

== Early years ==
Głąbiński was born on 25 February 1862 in Skole, in the Stryi district, Eastern Galicia, in what was then the Austrian Empire. His father, Jan Głąbiński, was a participant in the Krakow Uprising in 1846 and the Revolutions of 1848. Jan worked as a tax official in Brzozów, Czortków, Sambór and Skole. He became a town councillor and assessor in Sambor. Little is known about Stanisław Głąbiński's mother, Teofila, née Niedzielska.

After graduating from grammar school in Sambór in 1880, Stanisław Głąbiński's was admitted to the Faculty of Law at the University of Lwów. He was a member of the Academic Reading Room and of the Brotherly Aid of Law Students of the Lwów University of Technology, and participated in the meetings of the scientific "Tourist Circle". In 1882, Głąbiński's published his first work in "Wędrowiec" [Wanderer]. It discussed the situation of Poles in Silesia.

== Academic career ==
After graduating from university in 1885, Głąbiński began legal training in Sambór. In 1887, he received his doctorate in Lwów. At the same time, he completed his studies in economics in Berlin and Munich.

In 1888, Głąbiński' started lecturing on social economy, economic policy and statistics at the National Agricultural College in Dublany, In 1889, he became a lecturer at the University of Lwów on the history of socialism and social legislation in the 19th century, and later on social economics. He got his postdoctoral lecturing qualifications on the basis of a small dissertation entitled "On the Physiocratic System in Social Economics". He also dealt with treasury, financial and fiscal policy, and economic history. He also published his articles, studies and dissertations in Oesterr. ung. Revue, Polski ekonomista [Polish Economist], Przegląd Prawa i Administracji [Review of Law and Administration], and Kraj [Country].

Głąbiński became a member of the Academy of Social Sciences in Philadelphia; the Scientific Society in Lwów, the National Statistical Council, and the Institute of Science for Emigration and Colonization. He co-founded the General Academic Lectures and the Society of Academic Courses.

In 1892, Głąbiński became an associate professor at the Lwów University of Technology, and three years later (from 5 September 1895) a full-time professor. From 1899 to 1900 he held the office of dean of the Faculty of Law, and from 1908 to 1909 he was the rector of the University of Lwów.

Głąbiński helped establish the Raiffeisen Credit Unions in Galicia. He took part in organizing the General National Exhibition in Lwów in June 1894. He was a city councillor in Lwów (chairman of the budget committee).

== Political career ==
=== Advocacy for Galicia ===
Around 1890, Głąbiński started working with Gazeta Narodowa [National Newspaper], a Galician daily newspaper closely linked to the Eastern Galician conservatives (the so-called Podolacy). Between 1890 and 1892, he served as deputy editor-in-chief and manager of the paper.

In 1896, Głąbiński tried to run as an independent candidate in the supplementary elections to the National Sejm (Parliament) in Lwów, but was defeated In 1897 Przegląd Wszechpolski [The All-Polish Review] printed his work entitled "Economic Development and National Culture" (1 April 1897, No. 7). Soon after, the paper started publishing his other work.

In 1897, Głąbiński became part of the National Democracy Party. However, he was not admitted to the National League, possibly because he opposed their illegal activity. From 1901 onwards, Głąbiński published in Słowo Polskie [Polish Word], where he promoted the building of a national-democratic group in the Austrian partition.

In 1903, using the structures of the National League, OKN and Towarzystwo Szkół Ludowych, Głąbiński joined in organising National Democracy in Eastern Galicia. On 6 January 1904, Głąbiński held a meeting in his flat with Jan Gwalbert Pawlikowski, Jan Ludwik Popławski, Ernest Adam, Leonard Tarnawski and the Galician democrats Tadeusz Dwernicki and Michał Grek. The men decided to set up the Galician National Democratic Party (NDP). On 17 January 1904, Głąbiński participated in the First Congress of the NDP in Galicia. He became a member of the statutory (programme and organisation) committee and the so-called "tighter" committee - the one from Lwów. He was one of the co-organizers of the Second NDP Congress, which took place in Lwów on 8–9 December 1905. He was elected the president of the party.

In 1902, Głąbiński won a seat in the elections to the Council of State (he held it continuously until 1918). He spoke on Polish-Ukrainian relations, the budget, financial and economic policy, the reform of electoral law for parliament and the National Sejm, railway reform. He defended the Polish character of the University of Lwów ). In addition, he advocated the need to expand Galicia's autonomy, which he expressed in his brochure The Idea of Independence and Galicia's Finances (1902). Głąbiński also took part in the work of the program committee of the Polish Circle (he co-wrote the economic program). Głąbiński was the president of the Polish Circle (12 November 1907 – 9 January 1911); later he was one of the vice-presidents; he was also the president of the NDP parliamentary club and the president and later the vice-president of the Joint Delegation to the Imperial Council in Austria and the Hungarian Parliament.

Głąbiński was in favor of extending political and economic autonomy for Galicia. During the negotiations on electoral reform for the Council of State, he was the Circle committee's electoral law specialist, and also took part in negotiations with the Government. Like most of the members of the Circle, he was regarded as an opponent of the four-party electoral system. After the electoral reform to the State Council was passed, he took part in the negotiations on electoral reform to the National Sejm as a member of the electoral reform commission. On 20 September 1908, Głąbiński was elected the chairman of the new commission, but on 28 December 1910, he resigned from the commission in the Sejm and on 12 January 1911 from its chairmanship. He also spoke on budgetary, fiscal and financial matters, as well as on education. He fought the national demands of Ukrainians, and spoke out against strikes and slogans for far-reaching social reforms raised by socialists.

Between 1904 and 1918, Głąbiński was a member of the National Sejm, and between 1910 and 1918 a member of the Bukovina Sejm. He worked in three committees: the Tax Committee, the Budget Committee, and the Railway Committee. In the Sejm (as well as in his journalistic texts), Głąbiński dealt with the railways, taxes, finance, education, and sought to extend the scope of Galician autonomy. In 1906-1907, throughout Galicia, the NDP (including Głąbiński) organised about 200 political rallies, during which they called for a reform of electoral law, "separation" of Galicia, liberating it from economic dependence on Vienna, and gaining legislative independence.

Głąbiński opposed the so-called Blok Namiestnikowski (Governor’s Bloc) created by Michał Bobrzyński. Głąbiński opposed the plans of the new Governor to conclude a Polish-Ukrainian agreement. He demanded that a Polish-national state of ownership be maintained in Galicia. He participated in works on a new national program for Galicia. Głąbiński advocated broadening the scope of powers of the National Sejm. increasing the powers of the National School Council and establishing a special National Administrative Court at the Governor's Office. In 1910. Głąbiński was considered as a possible Minister for Galicia. However, his candidature met with immediate opposition from Bobrzyński. Instead, he took up the post of Minister for Railways in Bienerth's cabinet. As a minister, against the stance of the Viennese financial and political circles (including the military), he decentralised and commercialised the railways, and Polonised the administration in Galicia.

Between 1912 and 1913, Głąbiński worked to establish a People's National Coalition. As a result, in September 1913, the National Christian and People's Union was established. Despite this success, his position in the structures was not stable. The national democratic movement underwent internal decomposition. Secession was made by the "Fronda" group within the "Zet" brothers, demanding independence from LN and SDN. In 1908-1909 another group of dissenters formed - the so-called "Rzeczpospolita" group.

Głąbiński was still perceived as the leader of the Galician NDP, but SDN was led by the tandem of Stanisław Grabski and Jan Gwalbert Pawlikowski. Before the outbreak of World War I, in opposition to the activists of National Democracy from the Congress Kingdom, Głąbiński advocated a loyal policy towards Austria-Hungary (he was skeptical about the orientation towards Russia, and was also seen as a critic of neo-Slavism). However, the decisions taken at the SDN conventions of May 1910 and March 1912 maintained Roman Dmowski's strategy.

=== World War I ===
On 28 July 1914. Głąbiński took part in the establishment of the so-called Committee for the Implementation of the "Unification and Independence of the Polish Lands" - then in the Central National Committee established in Lwów. As a delegate, Głąbiński took part in talks in Vienna with Count Leopold Berchtold, Austro-Hungarian Foreign Minister, and General Franz Conrad Hotzendorf, Chief of General Staff, regarding the creation of a Polish army. However, the talks ended in a fiasco. After the formation of the Supreme National Committee, Głąbiński became its member, but after a conflict with the socialists (also over the oath of the Eastern Legion), he resigned.

After Lwów was occupied by the Imperial Russian Army, Głąbiński moved to Vienna, where he was very active in the Polish Circle for the Polish cause. In 1915, he established contact with the Central Polish Agency in Lausanne, headed by Erazm Piltz (a former member of the Party for Real Politics from the Kingdom of Poland) and Marian Seyda (a member of the LN and SDN board in the Prussian partition). He supported the agency by sending texts and expert opinions on economic policy, national economics and commentaries on current political events. In the same year, he also established close cooperation with the "Rok Polski” [Polish Year] - a magazine promoting national ideas. Głąbiński also participated in a series of programme and discussion meetings with activists from the Inter-Party Political Circle in the Kingdom of Poland, seeking to build a broader agreement with the agrarian members of the PSL "Piast" and other circles and groups of the political centre-right. In Galicia, such a half-hearted agreement was reached in July 1917. At that time the SDN, PSL Piast and the National Union set up the Inter-Party Union.

After the proclamation of the Act of 5th November 1916 announcing the creation of a Polish state from the Russian partition (occupied by German troops), Głąbiński started to clearly distance himself from Austria-Hungary. Among other things, he announced a project on behalf of the Polish Circle in Vienna, which counteracted the imperial plans to separate Galicia and create the Kingdom of Lesser Poland, subordinated to the Austro-Hungarian monarchy.

Głąbiński belonged to the initiators of the so-called May Resolutions passed by the Polish Circle and the Polish Sejm Circle, which announced the construction of a united, independent Poland with access to the sea. Conservatives remained opposed, which led to the break-up of the coalition within the Polish Circle (4 November 1917) and the departure of the National Democrats in March 1918. Głąbiński consistently spoke out publicly against Austrian policy, e.g. in the context of the Brest Peace Treaty (on 23 January 1918, he submitted an interpellation on this matter to the Prime Minister Ernest Seidler, and protested in a letter signed to the Emperor. He argued that the Brest Peace was an act contrary to international law and the provisions of the London Conference of 1879, and announced that he would send orders and decorations, including the Leopold Order, back to the Emperor in protest).

On 2 October 1918, in the State Council, Głąbiński, Ignacy Daszyński and Tadeusz Tertil presented a motion attacking the pro-Austrian policy of the conservatives. He again announced the building of a united and independent Poland with access to the sea. He submitted a motion to the State Council to establish a Polish-Austrian-Hungarian Liquidation Commission, which was to deal with abolishing the occupation and handing over Galicia and Cieszyn Silesia to Poland. In the spring of 1918, as an SDN delegate, he held talks with Czech politicians (in Prague) on the issue of Cieszyn Silesia, and together with Aleksander Skarbek took part in the Conference of South Slavs in Ljubljana, Slovenia.

=== Polish independence ===
Głąbiński entered Józef Świeżyński's government as Minister of Foreign Affairs (23 October 1918 – 4 November 1918), which was discounted by the NDP leaders. At a meeting of the SDN leadership in Lwów, on 30 October 1918, Głąbiński explained that entering the government appointed by the Regency Council, which he had criticised earlier, was fully justified, as the Council had gained full sovereignty by virtue of the Address of 7 October. He also believed that 7 October 1918, and not 11 November, should be seen as the date on which Poland regained independence. As a Minister, Głąbiński sent telegrams to all the partitioning states, informing them of the breaking of ties with the occupying authorities on the territory of the Kingdom of Poland. He also prepared a draft of the 5-adjectives’ election law, which was later adopted by the government of Jędrzej Moraczewski. He also took part in the organisational work of the Kraków-based Polish Liquidation Commission and the Lwów-based Ruling Commission as Government Superintendent. Both institutions had the task of taking power from the hands of Austrian offices and administration.

After Józef Piłsudski returned to Poland and took over the power delegated by the Regency Council, Głąbiński, as one of the few leaders of the ND camp remaining in the country, took part in talks with Piłsudski. He demanded that the Provisional Head of State immediately removes the red banner from the tower of the Royal Castle in Warsaw and that a national government be set up soon, with representatives of all the major political parties.

After the appointment of the cabinet of Ignacy Jan Paderewski's cabinet, Głąbiński in January 1919 (at the express request of General Lucjan Żeligowski) was sent to an outpost in Bucharest. He obtained permission from the Romanian government and the French delegate to assemble Polish troops in Istanbul, Odessa and Bessarabia, and march them through Romania to Poland. They were to take part in fighting the Ukrainians in Galicia. He completed the mission successfully on 10 February 1919.

He did not participate in the campaign of the National Electoral Committee of Democratic Parties for the Legislative Sejm (26 January 1919). However, he was elected as an MP and took the oath only on his return to the country on 20 February 1919, and then became a member of the authorities of the new parliamentary club - the People's National Parliamentary Union. Głąbiński joined in the process of building the organisational structures of ZLN. Głąbiński was a member of the Supreme Council, and he also remained chairman of the ZLN parliamentary club. The actual leadership of the National Democracy policy in Poland remained in the hands of Stanisłąw Grabski. After Dmowski's return to Poland in February 1920, this division of political roles and responsibilities was maintained. Apart from his involvement in parliamentary work, Głąbiński was also active at that time in Galicia and the Borderlands. He co-founded, among other things: The Union of National Organisations of Eastern Lesser Poland, the Society for the Protection of the Borderlands and the League for the Defence of the Vilnius Land and the Republic as a whole.

In the Sejm, Głąbiński . sat on the Treasury and Budget Committee (as its chairman) and the Constitutional Committee. On 30 May 1919, on behalf of the ZLN, he submitted a draft constitution to the Constitutional Committee, of which he was the author. It was criticised not only by the opposition, mainly socialists, who did not agree with the provisions concerning the Roman Catholic Church, the restriction of the rights of national minorities, and bicameralism. He drafted the section of the Constitution on Citizens' Rights and Duties in the Sejm and was also the draftsman of the Citizenship Act. He proposed a number of laws in the areas of treasury, economy, and the labour question. He was one of the co-authors of the Act on the exchange and stamping of crowns, and he initiated the activities of the State Railway Council.

Głąbiński also participated in the struggle for the territorial shape of the state. Taking into account the historical and ethnographic arguments, he saw the Polish state as consisting of Eastern Borderlands with Vilnius and Grodno, Galicia, Greater Poland, Upper Silesia (with access to mines), Cieszyn Silesia, Spisz, Orava, Pomerania with Gdańsk, Warmia and Masuria. He also wrote in the press about the historical links between West Pomerania and the Republic of Poland. However, he saw the incorporation of this area into the Polish state as a long historical process, taking into account possible future changes in European politics. Głąbiński strove for such a shape of borders in the parliamentary forum, in dozens of journalistic texts, but also by supporting various local initiatives (mainly in the Borderlands and Galicia). In May 1921, together with Stanisław Zieliński, he travelled to the United States. There, he strove with the Polish community, opinion-forming circles (mainly journalists), and "governmental factors" for broad support for the Polish territorial programme.

=== Polish Majority Government ===
Between 1919 and 1926, Głąbiński participated in the work to build the so-called Polish Majority Government. Initially, this seemed extremely difficult, not least because there were secessions within ZLN. In July 1920, he joined the Council for State Defence (he attended only three sittings, between 15 and 22 July 1920). After the collapse of Władysław Grabski's government, Głąbiński was mentioned as a possible candidate for Minister of Foreign Affairs. However, he did not take up the portfolio. After the resignation of Wincenty Witos's government, Trąmpczyński, Speaker of the Sejm, offered Głąbiński a mission to form a government. In a letter to the Speaker, Głąbiński outlined the plans for the new government. He promised, among other things, to organise new elections to parliament (within 4 months), to carry out currency reform (the introduction of the Polish zloty), to increase the income of state enterprises (mainly on the railways), to tighten up tax policy, etc. He also presented his programme in the Sejm, during the Convention of Seniors. However, Głąbiński's candidature was not accepted. The only clubs to vote for him were the ZLN, the National Christian Party and Christian Democracy.

Between 1921 and 1922, Głąbiński strove to establish the so-called Polish Majority Government. He also actively participated in the parliamentary and presidential election campaigns (1922). His name was mentioned in the corridors as a presidential candidate. In the parliamentary elections, he ran for the Sejm from two electoral lists, traditionally from the Lwów list and the "capital" list - Warsaw list. The ChZJN leadership believed that his name, experience and popularity could strengthen the list in the capital. As a result, Głąbiński obtained a "double" mandate. He soon relinquished the latter in favour of Władysław Rabski.

After the assassination of the first President of the Second Republic Gabriel Narutowicz, Głąbiński took part in talks with the PSL "Piast" on the formation of a coalition government. After the government was formed, with Witos as Prime Minister, Głąbiński received the portfolio of Deputy Prime Minister and Minister of Religious Denominations and Public Education.

During his time as Minister, he carried out a number of major reforms, including the introduction of concessions for children on railway travels, the introduction of a uniform system of assessment, a uniform curriculum for the State Higher Teacher Training Course, the introduction of regulations defining the competences of pedagogical councils, regulations on the application of penalties against teachers by school district superintendents, the expansion of vocational and technical education (e.g. railway schools in Sosnowiec). He expanded vocational and technical education (e.g. railway schools in Sosnowiec and Radom, agricultural schools in Żyrowice, the Faculty of Crafts and Industry was established in the State Industrial School in Bydgoszcz).

In education for national minorities, he conducted a radical Polonization course. He changed Ukrainian grammar schools into Utraquist ones (with Polish inscriptions on the buildings), limited the number of hours of the Ukrainian language, and also initiated the creation of a Ukrainian university in Warsaw. Polonisation was also to be extended to Eastern Orthodox seminaries (with Polish as the language of instruction). Moreover, he strove to introduce the Polish language to rites and liturgy in the Orthodox Church and put forward a postulate of autocephaly, which was supposed to make the Orthodox Church independent from the Moscow Patriarchate. In education, especially at universities, he did not abolish the discriminatory numerus clausus principle (restrictions on admitting Jewish students), transferring the right to decide on these matters to individual faculty councils of universities. In the case of German education, he announced the liquidation of schools (mainly rural), where the number of students did not exceed 30, and he also liquidated a few secondary schools for young people of German origin (e.g. in Toruń). On 14 November 1923, in protest against the government's economic and fiscal policy, Głąbiński tendered his resignation.

After the collapse of the Witos government on 14 December 1923, Głąbiński was again considered a candidate for Prime Minister. In October 1924, during the 4th All-Polish Congress, he proposed a reform of the constitution and electoral law. He demanded that the powers of the President be increased, the age limit for parliamentary elections be raised, and voting rights for national minorities "disloyal to the Polish state" be restricted. He also put forward similar proposals in a series of articles published in the Lwów-based Słowo Polskie [Polish Word]. He was also questioned by the Sejm's Commission of Inquiry into Secret Organisations, in connection with the charge of collaborating with the radical Pogotowie Patriotów Polskich [Polish Patriots’ Rescue]. In May 1926, he took part in the talks on appointing the third Wincenty Witos cabinet.

After the May Coup of 1926, Głąbiński's position in the national camp visibly weakened. Like Władysław Grabski, he was accused of incompetent policies and wrong decisions. In June 1926, during a meeting of the ZLN Supreme Council in Poznań, Głąbiński remained on the Board, but only as President of the ZLN Sejm Circle. In spite of this, his candidacy appeared again in the presidential elections (1926). Głąbiński concentrated on his parliamentary work. He repeatedly spoke at the Sejm, especially on budgetary, fiscal and economic issues. He also drafted a revision of the Constitution and electoral laws (based on a draft by the ZLN of March 1926). The changes he postulated were intended to build a national state and to limit the political role of national minorities. As the author of the chapter of the March Constitution entitled On the Rights of Citizens, he now advocated their restriction (mainly with regard to national minorities).

In the election campaign of 1927-1928, Głąbiński participated in talks on the formation of a broader coalition with ChD, NPR, PSL "Piast", SChN. Ultimately, this agreement was not reached. Głąbiński ran for the Senate and won a seat. Roman Rybarski was elected chairman of the ZLN parliamentary club, and the Senate club was headed by Głąbiński. He was also put forward as a candidate for Speaker of the Senate but received only 8 votes. In his parliamentary work, he spoke out on budgetary and fiscal matters and participated in the work of the Treasury and Budget Committee. He criticised the government and Sanation economists for their statist policy, state interventionism, and lack of a broad and long-term plan for the country's economic development.

Głąbiński also maintained close contact with the Lwów nationalist milieu. He was a patron of the local Young People's Party Youth Movement, headed by Zdzisław Stahl. He also took part in the organisational work of the SN. He was a member of the National Party Organisational Committee (29 June 1928); the Programme Council; took an active part in setting up the SN Organisational Committee in Lwów (September 1928); was a delegate to the SN Main Board meeting in Warsaw (October 1928), and was elected to the Political Committee there. He also co-initiated the formation of the National Defence League (a military arm of the SN).

In the so-called Brześć elections of 1930 Głąbiński ran for Senate and won a seat again (he became Chairman of the SN Senate Club). In his parliamentary work, he traditionally dealt with economic and budgetary issues. He was critical of the April Constitution (e.g. his speech in the Senate on 4 July 1935). After Słowo Polskiewas taken over by the "Team of One Hundred", which cooperated with Sanation, Głąbiński launched a new magazine Lwowski Dziennik Narodowy ("The National Daily in Lwów"), which disappeared from the press market after less than two years. Later, he also supported the establishment of the Słowo Narodowe [National Word ](1937 -1939). Between 1937 and 1939 Głąbiński was mainly active in politics in Lwów, but he also periodically and systematically published texts in the national press: local (e.g. in "Lwowski Dziennik Narodowy" and "Słowo Polskie") and nationwide (e.g. in "Warszawski Dziennik Narodowy" [Warsaw National Daily], "Myśli Narodowej" [National Idea] and "Kurier Poznański" [Poznań Courier]). He also did some academic work, publishing successive texts on national economics, fiscal issues and budgetary policy. He also wrote legal (systemic) expert opinions, in which he evaluated the Polish constitutional system.

In 1939, Głąbiński published his political memoirs in Pelplin and started to work on the history of Polish economics. In May 1939, he participated in the campaign for the municipal elections in Lwów. He co-founded the Electoral Committee of the National-Catholic Camp which ran under the slogan: "Lwów was, is and will be Polish". He did not get involved in the internal disputes within the SN between the opposing factions: Jędrzej Giertych and Kazimierz Kowalski with Tadeusz Bielecki's group.

=== Final years ===
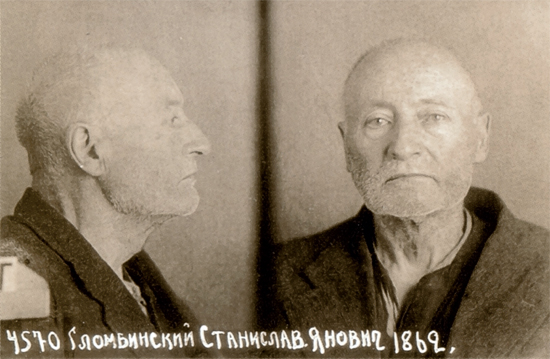
Photographed in an NKVD internment camp, 1940

In the first days after the outbreak of World War II, Głąbiński got involved in the activities of the Social Self-Defence Committee in Lwów and the Civic Committee for the Defence of Lwów. On 11 September 1939, Głąbiński was about to leave Lwów in the direction of the Romanian border, but he had a car accident and was forced to return to Lwów again.

On 17 September 1939, Głąbiński was arrested by Soviet agents and locked up in the NKVD headquarters in Lwów. A few days later, he was taken to the Brygidki prison. Głąbiński was accused of leading a counter-revolutionary organization and attempting to illegally cross the border.

In the spring of 1940 Głąbiński was transported to Moscow. He was moved to the Lubyanka prison, then in Butyrka prison. On 14 June 1941, the Supreme Court of the Russian Federal Soviet Socialist Republic passed a sentence in his case. He was accused of anti-Soviet activity, an attempt to illegally cross the border and was sentenced to eight years' imprisonment. On 14 August 1941, Stanisław Głąbiński died in prison in Kharkov in what is today Ukraine at the age of 79.

He was married to Maria Głąbińska, nee Zadurowicz (1872-1926), who is buried in Lwów, on Lychakiv Cemetery.

== Memberships ==
- the Parceling Society
- the Trade and Geographical Society
- the National Industrial Association (chairman until 1902)
- the Society of Academic Courses for Women
- Society of Agricultural Circles (vice-president)
- Union of Commercial and Economic Associations
- Union of 30 Galician Cities
- National Railway Council
- Supervisory Board and Board of Directors of the Society of People's School (president)
- 4th district of Sokół Association (president)

== Published works ==
- The concept of treasury science (1889 and 1890),
- The reform of currency in Austria ("Ekonomista" [Economist], 1890),
- Views on the present state of agriculture ("Przegląd Prawa i Administracji" [Review of Law and Administration],
- "Niwa" [Field], 1893),
- History and Statistics of the Austro-Hungarian Monarchy (together with L. Finkel, 1897),
- Lecture on Social Economy (1912)
- Treasury Science (1925),
- National Economics (1927-8),
- Polish Treasury Law (1928),
- History of Economics (2 vols. 1939).
