= Andrzej Hławiczka =

Polish musicologist (1866–1914)

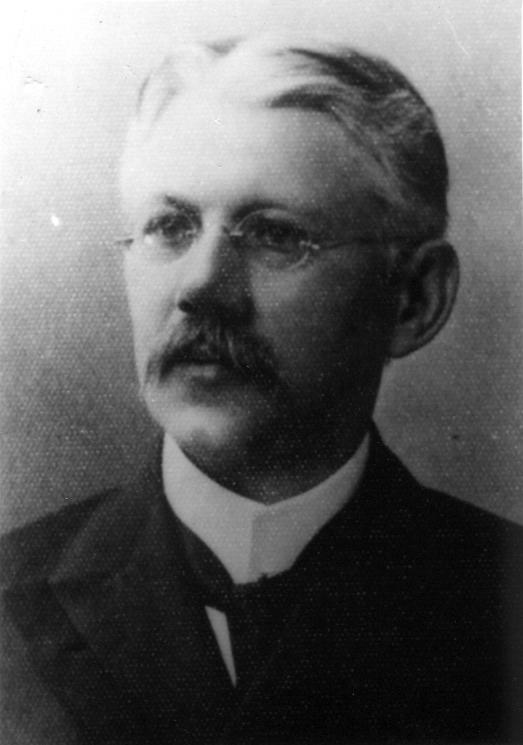
- Andrzej Hławiczka
- Born: 3 May 1866; Dzięgielów, Austrian Empire
- Died: 13 July 1914 (aged 48); Teschen, Austria-Hungary
- Citizenship: Austrian
- Occupation(s): Musicologist, educator
- Children: Karol, musicologist Jan, geographer Adam, pastor

Andrzej Hławiczka (3 May 1866 in Dzięgielów – 13 July 1914 in Cieszyn) was a Polish musicologist, ethnographer, teacher and one of leaders of spiritual revival of Lutheran church in Cieszyn Silesia.

He was a son of a peasant. Andrzej Hławiczka attended a primary school in Puńców and in 1886 graduated from a teachers' seminary in Cieszyn). He then taught in Protestant primary schools in Ustroń and Cieszyn and also worked in several other schools. Hławiczka was also active in collecting information about musical life of Cieszyn Silesia, he collected also many folks songs. Hławiczka published articles about regional music and also several song books.

Hławiczka was killed by his former student.

He was father of musicologist and composer Karol Hławiczka; geographer Jan; and pastor Adam.

== Song books ==
- Pieśni religijne (1904)
- Pieśni śląskie i towarzyskie (1905)
- Śpiewnik szkolny (vol. 1–3) (1901–1914)
