= Stanisław Grabski =

Polish economist and politician (1871–1949)

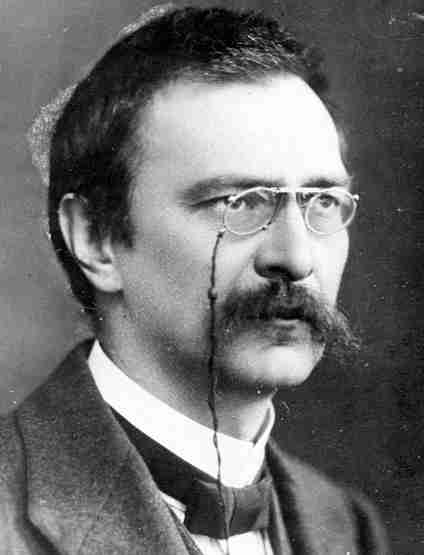
- Stanisław Grabski in c. 1919

Minister of Religious Affairs and Public Education
- In office 25 March 1925 – 15 May 1926
- President: Stanisław Wojciechowski
- Prime Minister: Władysław Grabski; Aleksander Skrzyński; Wincenty Witos
- Preceded by: Bolesław Miklaszewski
- Succeeded by: Antoni Sujkowski
- In office 27 October 1923 – 15 December 1923
- President: Stanisław Wojciechowski
- Prime Minister: Wincenty Witos
- Preceded by: Stanisław Głąbiński
- Succeeded by: Bolesław Miklaszewski

Personal details
- Born: April 5, 1871 Borów, Congress Poland, Russian Empire
- Died: May 6, 1949 (aged 78) Sulejówek, Poland
- Resting place: Powązki Cemetery, Warsaw
- Party: National-Democratic Party; Popular National Union
- Spouse(s): Ludmiła Rożen (1895–1915); Zofia Smolikówna (1916–1949)
- Occupation: Politician, economist

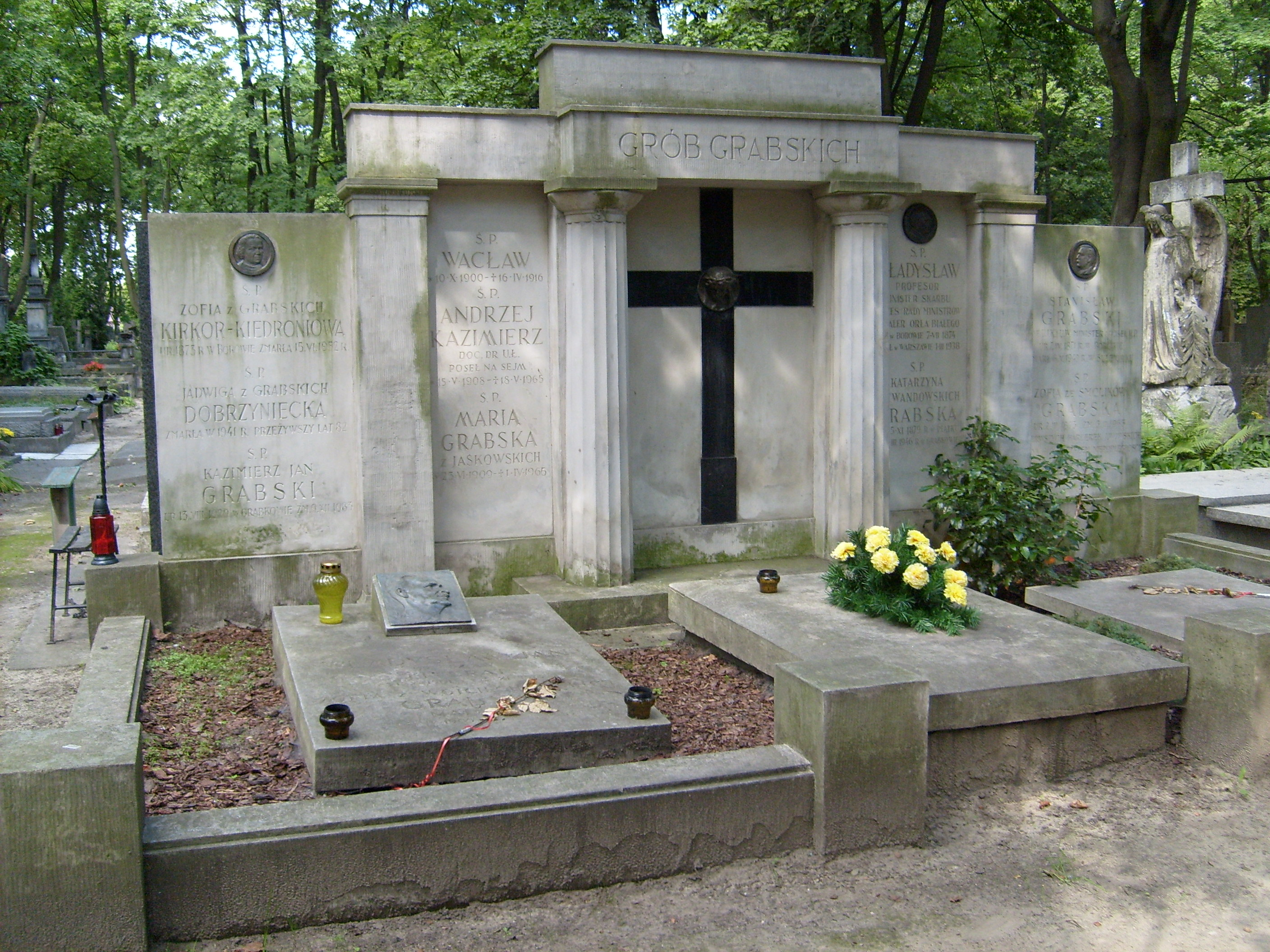
Grave of Stanisław Grabski at Grabski family grave at Powązki Cemetery in Warsaw

Stanisław Grabski (pronounced [staˈɲiswaf ˈɡrapskʲi]; 5 April 1871 – 6 May 1949) was a Polish economist and politician associated with the National Democracy political camp. As the top Polish negotiator during the Peace of Riga talks in 1921, Grabski greatly influenced the future of Poland and the Soviet Union.

Stanisław Grabski was the brother of Władysław Grabski, another prominent Polish economist and politician who served as prime minister, and of political activist Zofia Kirkor-Kiedroniowa.

== Biography ==
Stanisław Grabski became a political activist early in his life. In 1890, in Berlin, he edited Gazeta Robotnicza (The Workers' Gazette). In 1892 he cofounded the Polish Socialist Party (PPS), but in 1901 he detached himself from that political movement to become a member of Roman Dmowski's "nationalist" camp (later known as National Democracy).

A member of the National League since 1905, a year later he became one of its leaders. From 1907 he was a member of Dmowski's party, the National-Democratic Party. During World War I Grabski, like Dmowski, supported the idea that Poles should ally with Russia, and later he joined Dmowski's Polish National Committee (Komitet Narodowy Polski) in Paris.

From 1919 to 1925, in newly independent Poland (the Second Polish Republic), he was a deputy to the Sejm (the Polish parliament) from the right-wing Popular National Union (Związek Ludowo-Narodowy).

During the Polish-Soviet War (1919–1921), he strongly opposed the alliance between Poland and the Ukrainian People's Republic (represented by Symon Petliura). He resigned as chair of the parliamentary commission on foreign relations in protest of this alliance. During the negotiations of the Peace of Riga (1921), he was the most influential Polish negotiator and was largely responsible for their outcome. The peace treaty resulted in partitioning of Ukraine and Belarus between Poland and the Soviet Union. While peace with Soviet Russia had been accomplished, the "federalist" objectives of Józef Piłsudski had thus been defeated.

In 1923 and from 1925 to 1926 he was the Minister of Religious Beliefs and Public Education. In that time he further pursued nationalist policies, especially Polonization. He was the architect of the 1924 Lex Grabski, which de facto sought to eliminate the Ukrainian language from Polish schools. These policies resulted in a dramatic increase in Ukrainian private schools and served to alienate Ukrainian youths from Polish authority. In 1926 he was also one of the first Poles to speak on radio, during the Polish Radio inauguration ceremony. He was also one of the principal Polish negotiators for the Concordat of 1925.

After Piłsudski's May Coup in 1926 he distanced himself from politics and concentrated on academic research into economics. Before the Second World War, he was a professor at the Lwów University, Dublany Agricultural Academy, and Jagiellonian University.

When the Soviet Union took control of Eastern Poland (Kresy) in 1939, following the Invasion of Poland, Grabski was arrested by the Soviets and imprisoned, like many prominent Polish intellectuals. Following the Sikorski-Mayski Agreement, he was released and moved to London, where he joined the Polish government in exile. He returned to Poland in 1945. Working closely together with Polish communist Wanda Wasilewska, Grabski (who referred to Stalin as "the greatest realist of all") sought to use Stalin to create a compact and ethnically homogenous Poland and helped to design a program for implementing policies to insure an ethnically pure Polish state. He proposed Polish and Ukrainian resettlement plans to Stalin, and traveled to Lviv in order to urge Poles to leave. He became one of the deputies to the president of the quasi-parliament State National Council, until the new Sejm was elected in the 1947 Polish legislative election. Afterwards he returned to his teaching career, becoming a professor at the University of Warsaw.

He died in Sulejówek and was buried at Powązki Cemetery in the family grave of the Grabski family.

== Views ==
Grabski was an outspoken exponent of nationalist ideology in the interwar period. Agreeing with Roman Dmowski on the goal of assimilating the non-Polish population of the Kresy, Grabski differed in his approach. Whereas Dmowski apparently sought to recognize Ukrainians and Belarusians as folk variants of Poles, Grabski's approach was to reduce the non-Polish population to the status of second-class citizens and limiting their contact with the Polish majority. By creating a contrast between an advanced Polish culture and a primitive minority culture Grabski hoped that long term assimilation would be assured.

== Family ==
In 1895, Grabski married Ludmiła Rożen. The couple had five children – three daughters (Feliksa, Ludmiła, Janina) and two sons (Stanisław and Zbigniew). Stanisław died in 1920 during the Polish-Soviet War. Zbigniew (1907–1943) was a scoutmaster, jailed until 1941 by Soviets, he died as a result of an accident during his military duties. After the death of his wife in 1915, Stanisław Grabski married Zofia Smolikówna in 1916. They had two daughters – Anna (born 1919) and Stanisława (1922–2008).

== Quotes ==
- "We want to base our relationships on love, but there is one kind of love for countrymen and another for aliens. Their percentage among us is definitely too high (...) The foreign element will have to see if it will not be better off elsewhere. Polish land for the Poles!" (1919)
- "The transformation of the state territory of the Republic into a Polish national territory is a necessary condition of maintaining our frontiers."

== Works ==
- Zarys rozwoju idei społeczno-gospodarczych w Polsce (A sketch of the Development of Socioeconomic Ideas in Poland) (1903)
- Ekonomia społeczna (Social Economy) (1927–1929)
- Państwo narodowe (A Nation State) (1929)
- Ku lepszej Polsce (Toward a Better Poland) (1937)
- Na nowej drodze dziejowej (On a New Path of History) (1946)
- Pamiętniki (Memoirs), prepared for print and edited by W. Stankiewicz (1989)
