= Hlavečník =

- Municipality
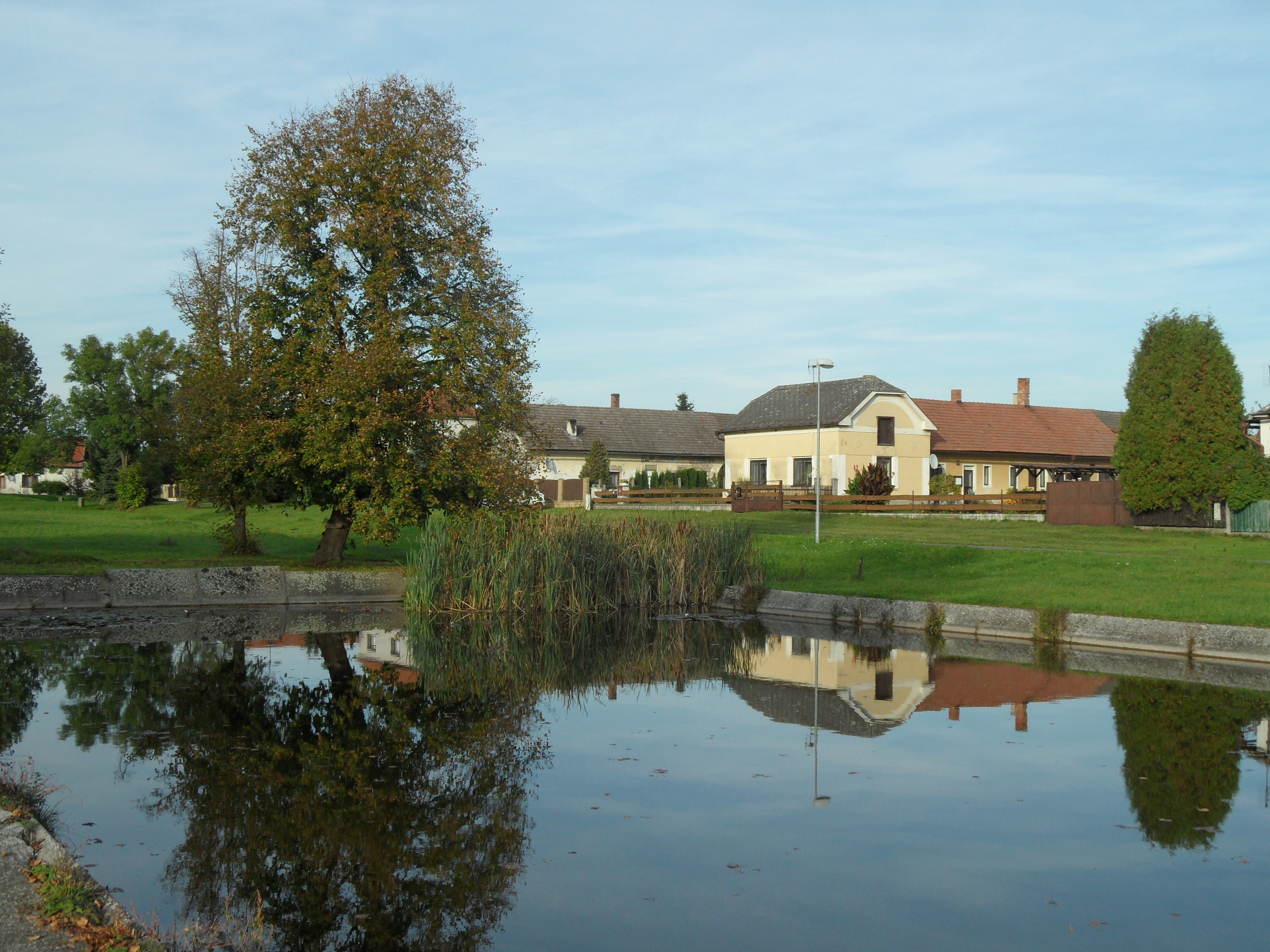
- Centre of Hlavečník

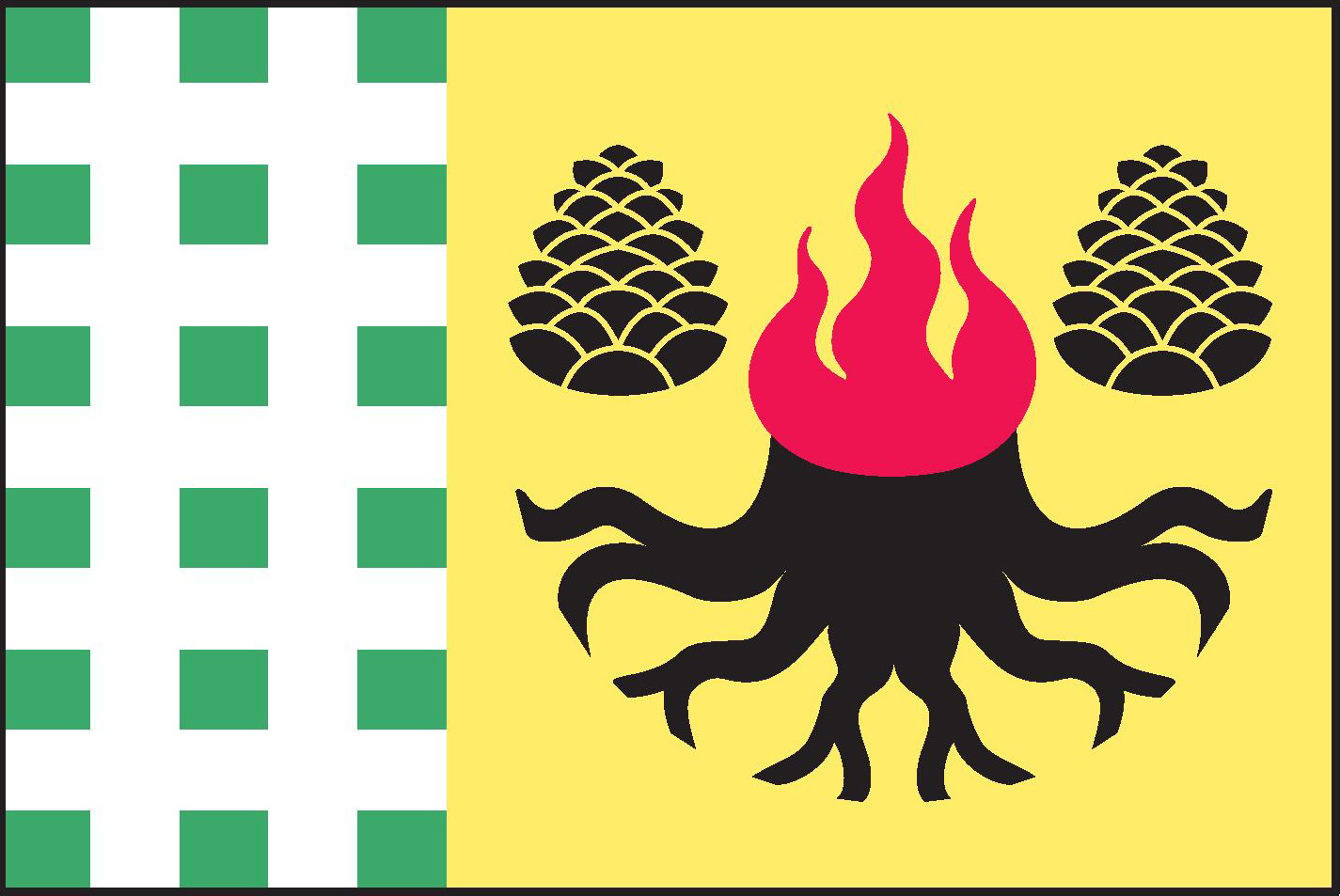
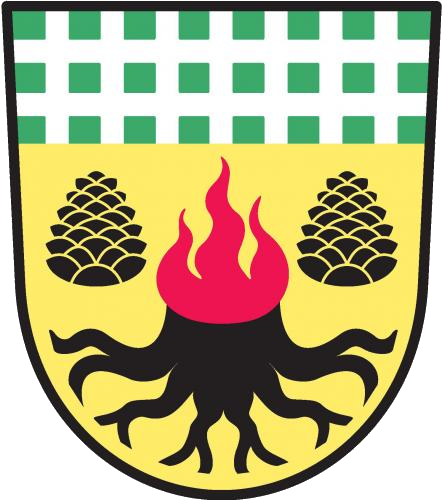
- Flag Coat of arms

- Location in the Czech Republic
- Coordinates: 50°4′32″N 15°25′36″E
- Country: Czech Republic
- Region: Pardubice
- District: Pardubice
- First mentioned: 1229

Area
  - Total: 6.40 km^{2} (2.47 sq mi)
- Elevation: 214 m (702 ft)

Population (2026-01-01)
  - Total: 288
  - Density: 45.0/km^{2} (117/sq mi)
- Time zone: UTC+1 (CET)
  - Summer (DST): UTC+2 (CEST)
- Postal code: 533 15
- Website: www.hlavecnik.cz

Hlavečník is a municipality and village in Pardubice District in the Pardubice Region of the Czech Republic. It has about 300 inhabitants.

== Demographics ==
Historical population
Year	Pop.	±%
1869	513	—
1880	531	+3.5%
1890	556	+4.7%
1900	603	+8.5%
1910	620	+2.8%
1921	610	−1.6%
1930	557	−8.7%
1950	424	−23.9%
1961	424	+0.0%
1970	386	−9.0%
1980	295	−23.6%
1991	260	−11.9%
2001	237	−8.8%
2011	285	+20.3%
2021	265	−7.0%
Source: Censuses
