= Zofia Kirkor-Kiedroniowa =

Polish national activist

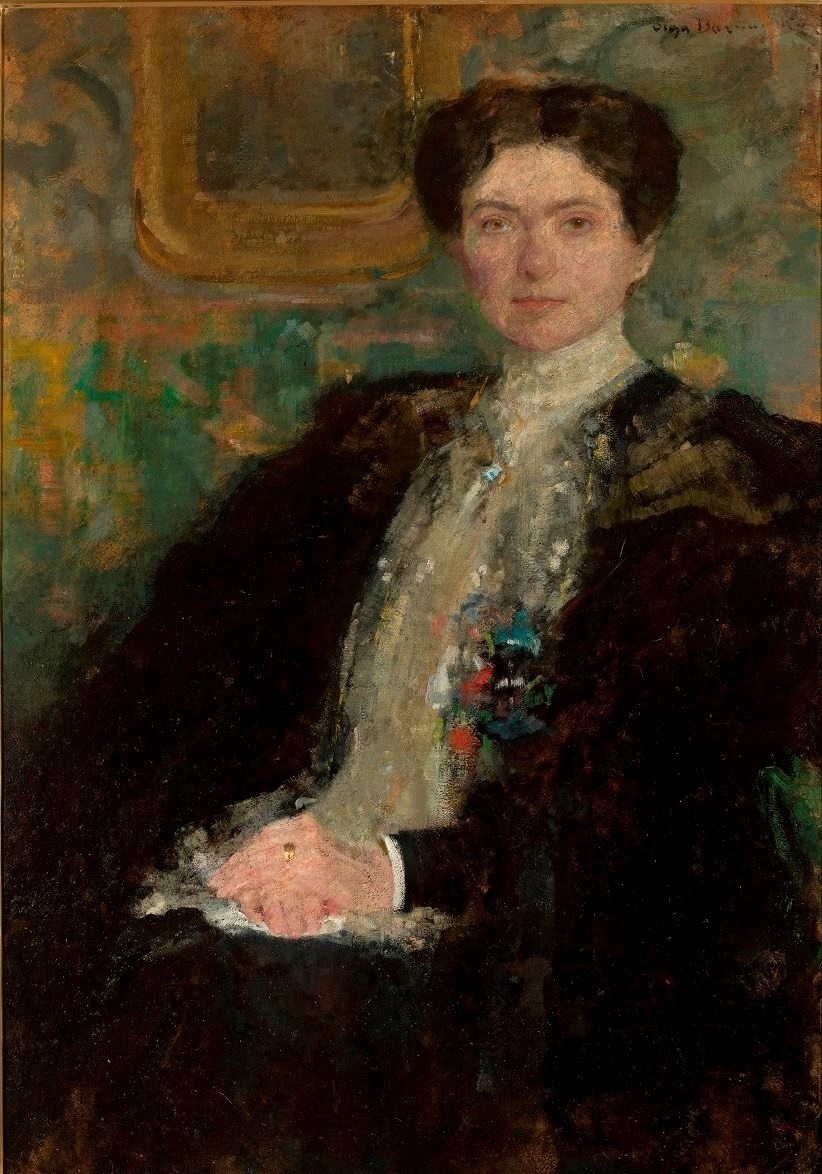
- Portrait of Zofia Kirkor-Kiedroniowa by Olga Boznańska, 1903–1905
- Born: Zofia Grabska; 14 May 1872; Borów, Congress Poland
- Died: 15 June 1952 (aged 80); Warsaw, Poland
- Resting place: Powązki Cemetery, Warsaw
- Occupation: Activist
- Spouse(s): Dymitr Kirkor (1896–1900); Józef Kiedroń (1905–1932)
- Relatives: Stanisław Grabski (brother); Władysław Grabski (brother)

Zofia Kirkor-Kiedroniowa (née Grabska; 14 May 1872 – 15 June 1952) was a Polish national activist.

== Life and career ==
Zofia Grabska was born to Feliks and Stanisława Grabski at the family possession in the village of Borów. Her brothers were Stanisław Grabski, politician and economist; and Władysław Grabski, Prime Minister of Poland. Until the age of ten, she attended school in her village, later moving to Warsaw. She graduated from a university there and passed the state exam for the mathematics teacher.

Grabska was an activist of the Polish Socialist Party, for that she was arrested by Russian authorities and in 1894 sent to Perm and Yekaterinoslav. In 1896 she returned to Warsaw, and since 1900 cooperated with Liga Narodowa (National League), a political organization of the right-wing National Democracy camp. From 1905 to 1920 she resided in Cieszyn Silesia, where she was active together with her husband Józef Kiedroń in Polskie Zjednoczenie Narodowe (Polish National Unity) political organization of right-wing character. In 1918 she became a member of the Rada Narodowa Księstwa Cieszyńskego (National Council of the Duchy of Cieszyn), a Polish self-government council working to join Cieszyn Silesia to Poland. Zofia Kirkor-Kiedroniowa also edited the Dziennik Cieszyński (Cieszyn Daily) newspaper.

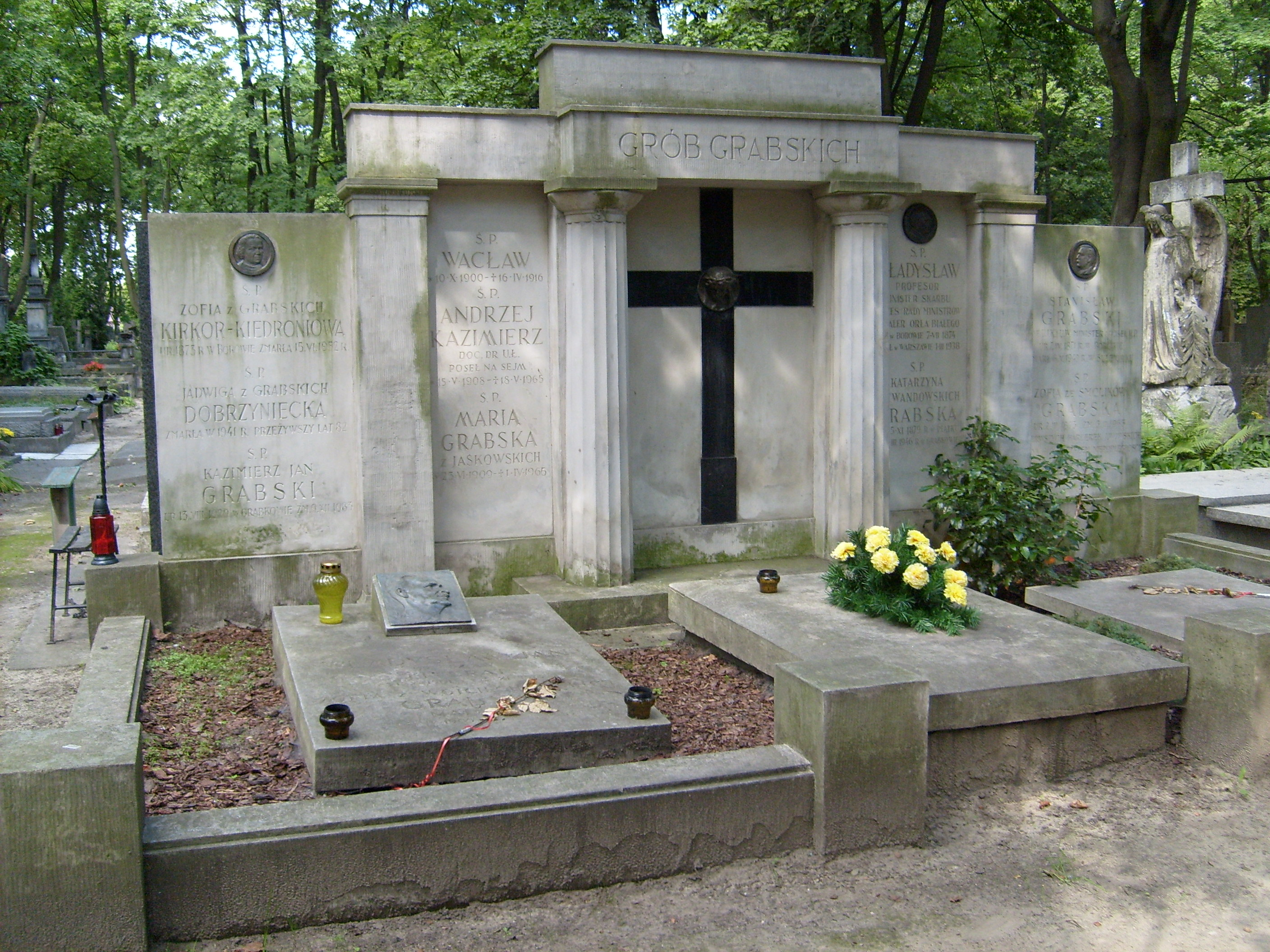
Grave of Zofia Kirkor-Kiedroniowa at Grabski family grave in Warsaw

In 1896 she married socialist activist Dymitr Kirkor. Her husband died in December 1900. Her son from the first marriage, Dr. Stanisław Kirkor, was a civil servant in the Ministry of Treasury. On 1 August 1905 she married Józef Kiedroń, Polish engineer and politician from Cieszyn Silesia, and settled down with him in Dąbrowa. In 1920, Cieszyn Silesia was divided between Poland and Czechoslovakia by the decision of Spa Conference, in which Kiedroń was present as a Polish delegate. Dąbrowa fell to Czechoslovakia and Zofia Kirkor-Kiedroniowa together with her husband left the Trans-Olza area, as they were active Polish activists; and stayed in Warsaw. Since May 1925 she lived in Siemianowice Śląskie. In 1932, after the death of her second husband, Zofia Kirkor-Kiedroniowa retired from public life.

During the Warsaw Uprising she stayed in Warsaw, in 1945 moved to her birthplace of Borów. Zofia Kirkor-Kiedroniowa died on 15 June 1952 in Warsaw and is buried in the Grabski family grave at the Powązki Cemetery in Warsaw.

From 1986 to 1989 her memoirs and notes were published in three volumes as Memoirs. They serve as an important source of knowledge about the daily life and political life of Congress Poland, Cieszyn Silesia and the Second Polish Republic. They also offer an insight into the life of Grabski family and the highest-ranked politicians of interwar period.

== Works ==
- Włościanie i ich sprawa w dobie organizacyjnej i konstytucyjnej Królestwa Polskiego (Peasants and Peasant Question during the Organizational and Constitutional Period of the Kingdom of Poland) (1912)
- Wspomnienia (Memoirs)
  - Wspomnienia (vol. I, 1986)
  - Wspomnienia. Ziemia mojego męża (The Land of My Husband) (vol. II, 1988)
  - Wspomnienia. Lata 1920-1932 oraz wspomnienia i notatki pisane w czasie Powstania Warszawskiego (Years 1920-1932 and Memoirs and Notes Written during the Warsaw Uprising) (vol. III, 1989)
