= Władysław Grabski =

Polish politician, historian (1874-1938)

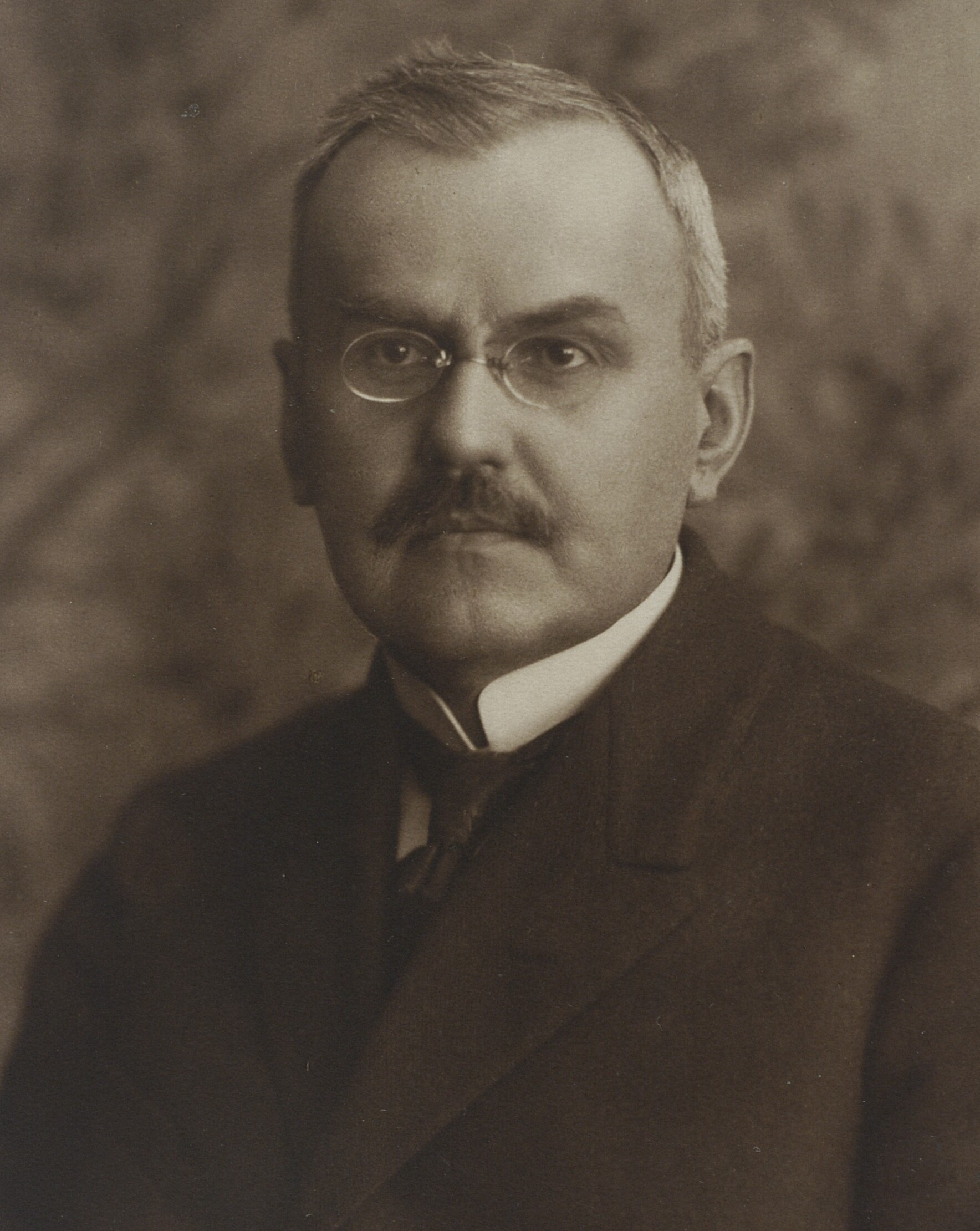
- Grabski c. 1930

Prime Minister of Poland
- In office 19 December 1923 – 14 November 1925
- President: Stanisław Wojciechowski
- Deputy: Stanisław Thugutt
- Preceded by: Wincenty Witos
- Succeeded by: Aleksander Skrzyński
- In office 27 June 1920 – 24 July 1920
- Chief of State: Józef Piłsudski
- Preceded by: Leopold Skulski
- Succeeded by: Wincenty Witos

Minister of Finance of Poland
- In office 19 December 1923 – 14 November 1925
- Prime Minister: Himself
- Preceded by: Władysław Kucharski
- Succeeded by: Jerzy Zdziechowski
- In office 13 January 1923 – 1 July 1923
- Prime Minister: Władysław Sikorski; Wincenty Witos
- Preceded by: Bolesław Markowski
- Succeeded by: Hubert Linde
- In office 13 December 1919 – 25 November 1920
- Prime Minister: Leopold Skulski; Himself; Wincenty Witos
- Preceded by: Leon Biliński
- Succeeded by: Jan Kanty Steczkowski

Personal details
- Born: Władysław Dominik Grabski; 7 July 1874 Borów, Congress Poland, Russian Empire
- Died: 1 March 1938 (aged 63) Warsaw, Second Polish Republic
- Resting place: Powązki Cemetery, Warsaw
- Party: National-Democratic Party; Popular National Union
- Spouse: Katarzyna Lewandowska (since 1902)
- Children: 4, including Władysław Jan
- Relatives: Małgorzata Kidawa-Błońska (great-granddaughter)
- Occupation: Politician, economist
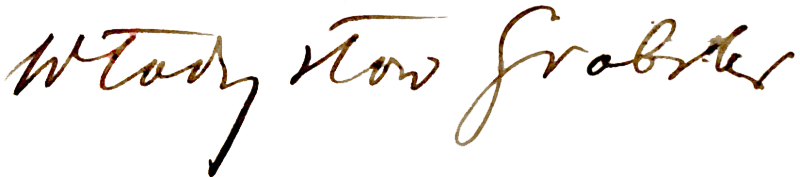
- Signature

Władysław Dominik Grabski (pronounced [vwaˈdɨswav ˈɡrapskʲi]; in official Russian documents Владисла́в Фе́ликсович Гра́бский; 7 July 1874 – 1 March 1938) was a Polish National Democratic politician, economist and historian. He was the main author of the currency reform in the Second Polish Republic and served as Prime Minister of Poland in 1920 and from 1923 to 1925. He was the brother of Stanisław Grabski and Zofia Kirkor-Kiedroniowa.

He was responsible for the creation of the Bank of Poland and implementing the zloty. Grabski's cabinet became the longest-standing cabinet in interwar Poland. At the same time, however, Grabski's cabinet was severely criticized. Stanisław Głąbiński, for example, criticized Grabski's inefficiencies in the sphere of international relations, and Wincenty Witos disapproved of Grabski's deficient agricultural reform, as well as his inability to inform the public of the state's real financial situation.

== Life ==
Władysław Grabski was born in 1874, in a family manor in Borów (a part of Gmina Bielawy) near Łowicz, Congress Poland, Russian Empire. He studied politics at the École Libre des Sciences Politiques (today: Sciences Po) and history at the University of Sorbonne. While in Paris, Grabski's political views changed. He abandoned the socialist ideas and turned more towards the right.

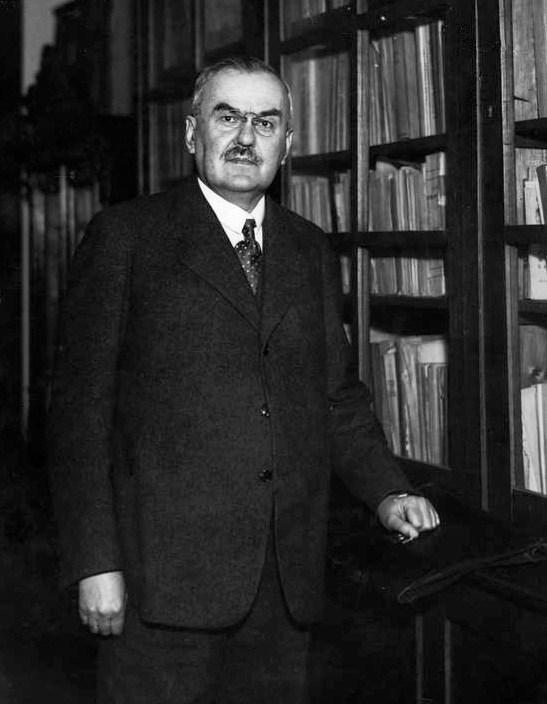
Władysław Grabski as rector of Warsaw University of Life Sciences

The years Władysław Grabski had spent in Paris became an impetus behind Grabski's desire for his involvement in the Polish government. Soon after Grabski's return from Paris, in 1905, he founded the Agricultural Society in Łowicz, in central Poland. The Society quickly won the support of many peasants, which in turn led to the creation of the National Labor Union.

Due to the growing autonomy and strength of Grabski's Agricultural Society and the Union, in 1905, Grabski was arrested by the Russian authorities and imprisoned in Warsaw. Grabski's imprisonment, however, lasted less than a year. In 1905, Grabski was elected on behalf of National Democracy as a member of three successive sessions of the Duma, the legislative assembly of the Russian Empire. He was a deputy in Duma until 1912. It was at that time that he became involved in the work of the budgetary commission with the Russian Ministry of Agriculture. Grabski's involvement in the budgetary Commission became a reason for his later desire to become the finance minister in the Polish parliament.

When World War I broke out, he organized the Central Citizens' Committee, which was responsible for restoring order into the life of a society devastated by the Polish partitions, and to represent the interests of Polish people before the Russian authorities. He also became a member of the Polish National Committee. In 1919, he entered the government of the newly restored Poland as Minister of Agriculture.

Grabski's influence on Polish affairs increased when he became Treasury Minister and Prime Minister in 1920. However, his first cabinet lasted for only one month. In December 1923, he was again appointed Prime Minister and served as Treasury Minister in a specialist cabinet (appointed by but not necessarily composed of elected parliamentary representatives). Grabski managed to implement reforms that alleviated Poland's economic situation and managed to preserve his cabinet for twenty-three months, a relatively long period for a Polish cabinet in interwar Poland. Until the end of 1924, Grabski's government enjoyed great popularity.

Yet Grabski remained a controversial figure for the twenty-three months he remained in office. Stanisław Głąbiński, for example, argued that in the sphere of foreign relations, Grabski did not show the desired assertiveness. At the League of Nations conference, Grabski did not mention the League's unresponsiveness to the Polish-Soviet War of 1919–1921. According to the tenth article of the treaty of Versailles, "The Members of the League undertake to respect and preserve as against external aggression the territorial integrity and existing political independence of all Members of the League". However, the League of Nations remained aloof and impassive in 1920.

Grabski's decision not to raise the issue of the League's lack of action resulted in severe criticism from the Polish parliament. Głąbiński was not the only critic of Grabski's cabinet. Wincenty Witos criticized Grabski for his excessively optimistic attitude regarding the financial reforms and so did others; nevertheless, the reform stopped the hyperinflation in its tracks.

On 13 November 1925 Grabski was forced to resign following a disagreement with the President of the Bank of Poland, who refused to help him with the backing of the industrialist 'Lewiatan' organization.

=== Currency reform ===
Grabski's (and the ministerial cabinet's) great achievement in those years was the foundation of the Bank of Poland and the creation of the new Polish currency – the gold-based zloty which replaced the Polish mark. The Act of 11 January 1924 on the improvement of the state's treasury and currency reform introduced a new monetary system and established the issuing bank. The Bank of Poland was founded as a joint stock company, which was supposed to guarantee its 'independence' from the government and the state treasury. The Act also abolished the Polish National Savings Union which had acted as an issuing bank. Its functions were taken over by the Bank of Poland. Stanisław Karpiński became the first president of the Bank of Poland. On 14 January, the organizing committee of the Bank of Poland was established, and, on 26 January, the sale of the bank's shares began. Payments could only be made in foreign currencies and in gold. On 15 April, during the first shareholders' meeting, the Bank of Poland Joint Stock Company was established.

Grabski went further than just establishing the Bank of Poland and the currency. He built a network of state banks and founded the Bank for National Economy. He also initiated far-going changes in the structure of Polish exports and industrial output. He also established the Border Defence Corps.

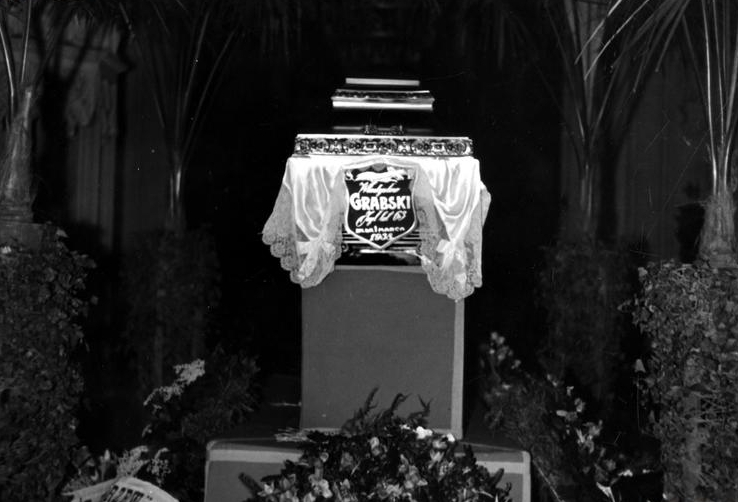
Grabski's coffin on a funeral bier, 4 March 1938

Nevertheless, criticism continued over aspects of Grabski's reforms. In 1925, Grabski himself commented that he was too optimistic about his economic reforms and that he should have realized that given the circumstances of depression and the recuperation from World War I, a complete recovery of the Polish economy was virtually impossible. There were enormous price discrepancies between agricultural and manufactured goods. The Bank of Poland was faced with both a commercial deficit and an increasing national debt.

The government made numerous unfavourable investments and in 1925, the Sejm approved a proposal for an excessively high budget, despite frequent warnings from Grabski's cabinet. On 29 July 1925, the value of the Polish złoty declined significantly. A tariff war broke out between Poland and Germany. Grabski resigned from his post in active politics in November of that year. He subsequently devoted himself to pedagogic and academic work at the Warsaw Agricultural University (SGGW). In 1926, he became its rector. In 1936 on his motion the Rural Sociology Institute was established, of which he remained the head until his death in 1938.

Władysław Grabski died from cancer on 1 March 1938 in Warsaw. The Holy Mass was led by Cardinal Aleksander Kakowski in the Saint John's Cathedral. His body was interred in the family grave at the Powązki Cemetery.

== Perception among Polish Jews ==
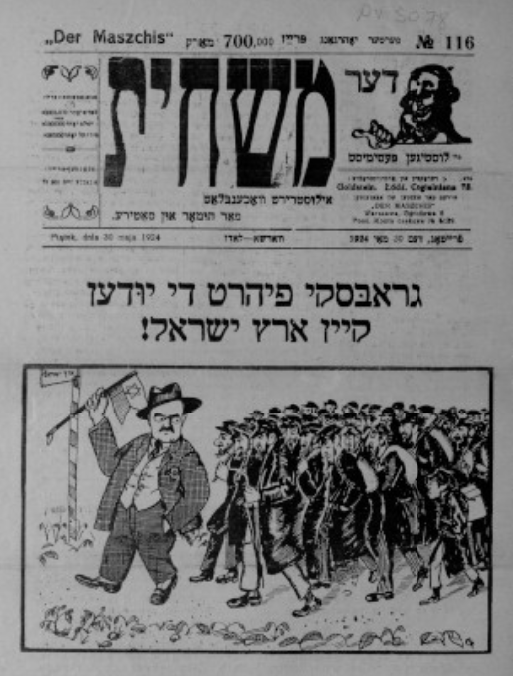
1924 Yiddish cartoon depicting "Grabski's Aliyah"

Between 1924 and 1926, mass emigration of Polish Jews to Palestine took place following the economic restrictions placed on Jews in Poland. This wave of Jewish migration became known as "Grabski's Aliyah" (Aliyah being the traditional Hebrew word for immigration to the Land of Israel) owing to the financial reforms conducted by Władysław Grabski at that time. In American Jewish media sources, Grabski's reforms were described as "an anti-Jewish taxation policy so severe that it resulted in a great immigration movement to Palestine, known as 'the Grasski Aliyah.'"

Scholars assessing the Grabski financial reforms note how the introduction of new finance policies strengthened political institutions. In the case of the 1924-25 reform program, fundamental changes were made to taxation policy and led to the increase of direct taxation that required increased state-citizen interactions. One effect of these reforms was that the state gathered extensive information on business activities and demanded taxation payments. The enactment of these policies was not without consequence as many citizens, especially Jewish merchants, perceived the reform as an unfair reform that demanded undue levels of taxation.

== Legacy ==
In 2004, Poland celebrated the 130th anniversary of Władyslaw Grabski's birthday and the 80th anniversary of the public finance reforms he introduced. In September 2003, the Sejm of the Republic of Poland passed a resolution proclaiming 2004 as Władyslaw Grabski's Year.

In 2004, a statue was unveiled in his birthplace village of Borów.

The Warsaw Agricultural University labelled him as a "great Pole, great statesman, social activist and a man of great heart and mind, one of the brightest Poles of the interwar period".

In July 2006, the newly opened Main Library of the Warsaw Agricultural University was named after Grabski, and in front of the library, the statue of Grabski was placed.

His grandson, Andrzej Feliks Grabski (1934–2000), became a historian.

== Works ==
- Historia Towarzystwa Rolniczego 1858–1861 (1904)
- Bilans Królestwa Polskiego w finansach Rosji (1909)
- Rocznik Statystyczny Królestwa Polskiego 1914 (ed.) (1915)
- Cel i zadania polityki agrarnej w Polsce (1918)
- O własnych siłach (1926)
- Dwa lata pracy u podstaw państwowości naszej (1927)
- Historia wsi w Polsce (1929)
- Kryzys rolniczy (1929)

== Decorations and awards ==
- Knight of the Order of the White Eagle (12 April 1924)
- Knight Grand Cross of the Order of the Crown (Romania)
- Order of Orange-Nassau (Netherlands)
- Knight of the Order of Saints Maurice and Lazarus (Italy)
- Order of the White Lion, 1st class (Czechoslovakia)
- Grand Cross of the Order of Pius IX (Vatican City)
- Order of the Cross of Liberty, 1st class (Civil) (Estonia)

Political offices
Preceded by Leopold Skulski	Prime Minister of Poland; 1920	Succeeded by Wincenty Witos
Preceded by Wincenty Witos	Prime Minister of Poland; 1923–1925	Succeeded by Aleksander Skrzyński
