= Karol Hławiczka =

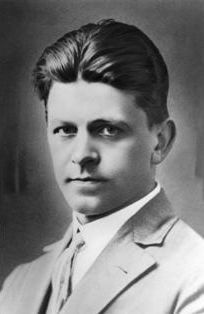
- Born: 14 February 1894; Ustroń, Austria-Hungary
- Died: 22 July 1976 (aged 82); Cieszyn, Poland
- Occupations: Composer; pianist; educator
- Parent: Andrzej (father)
- Relatives: Adam (brother)

Karol Hławiczka (14 February 1894 – 22 July 1976) was a Polish composer, pianist, teacher and Chopinologist.

== Biography ==
Hławiczka was born on 14 February 1894 in Ustroń to Andrzej Hławiczka, a teacher and musicologist. His family later relocated to Cieszyn. After graduation from high school Hławiczka went to Vienna to study law. However he did not finish the studies and returned to Cieszyn to work as organist in Lutheran church and teacher of singing in seminary for teachers. During World War I he led the marching band of Polish Legions in Cieszyn. Since 1925 he often performed as a pianist, and in 1928-1931 worked as a music teacher in Mysłowice. Since 1931 Hławiczka settled in Warsaw.

After World War II he moved to Czechoslovakia, where he established choirs Harfa in Český Těšín and Lutnia in Třinec. Hławiczka was active in Literary-Artistic Section of the Polish Cultural and Educational Union (PZKO). In 1958 he returned to Cieszyn, Poland, where he worked as a piano teacher until his retirement in 1964. He died on 22 July 1976 in Cieszyn.

He was a keen collector of regional and Protestant songs. He authored several school textbooks and songbooks; and also contributed to musical and pedagogical journals in Poland and abroad. Hławiczka also researched works of Fryderyk Chopin. He was awarded Knight's Cross of Polonia Restituta.

== Books ==
- Śpiewnik szkolny (1922, 1925)
- Główne zadania metodyczne nauki śpiewu w szkole powszechnej (1925)
- Solfeż polski (1926)
- 75 pieśni marszowych do użytku młodzieży szkolnej, harcerskiej i przysposobienia wojskowego (1931)
- Pieśni na uroczystości państwowe do użytku szkolnego (1933)
- Nauczanie śpiewu w szkole powszechnej (1934)
- Kaszuby : pieśni ludowe kaszubskie / na 2 i 3 głosy (1935) - Coauthor: Marjan Kuhn, Kashubia
- Wesołe piosenki (1936)
- Leć pieśni w dal (1936)
- Moja piosenka (1938)
- Pieśni znad Olzy (1939)
