= October 1922 =

Month of 1922

<<	October 1922					>>
Su	Mo	Tu	We	Th	Fr	Sa
1	2	3	4	5	6	7
8	9	10	11	12	13	14
15	16	17	18	19	20	21
22	23	24	25	26	27	28
29	30	31

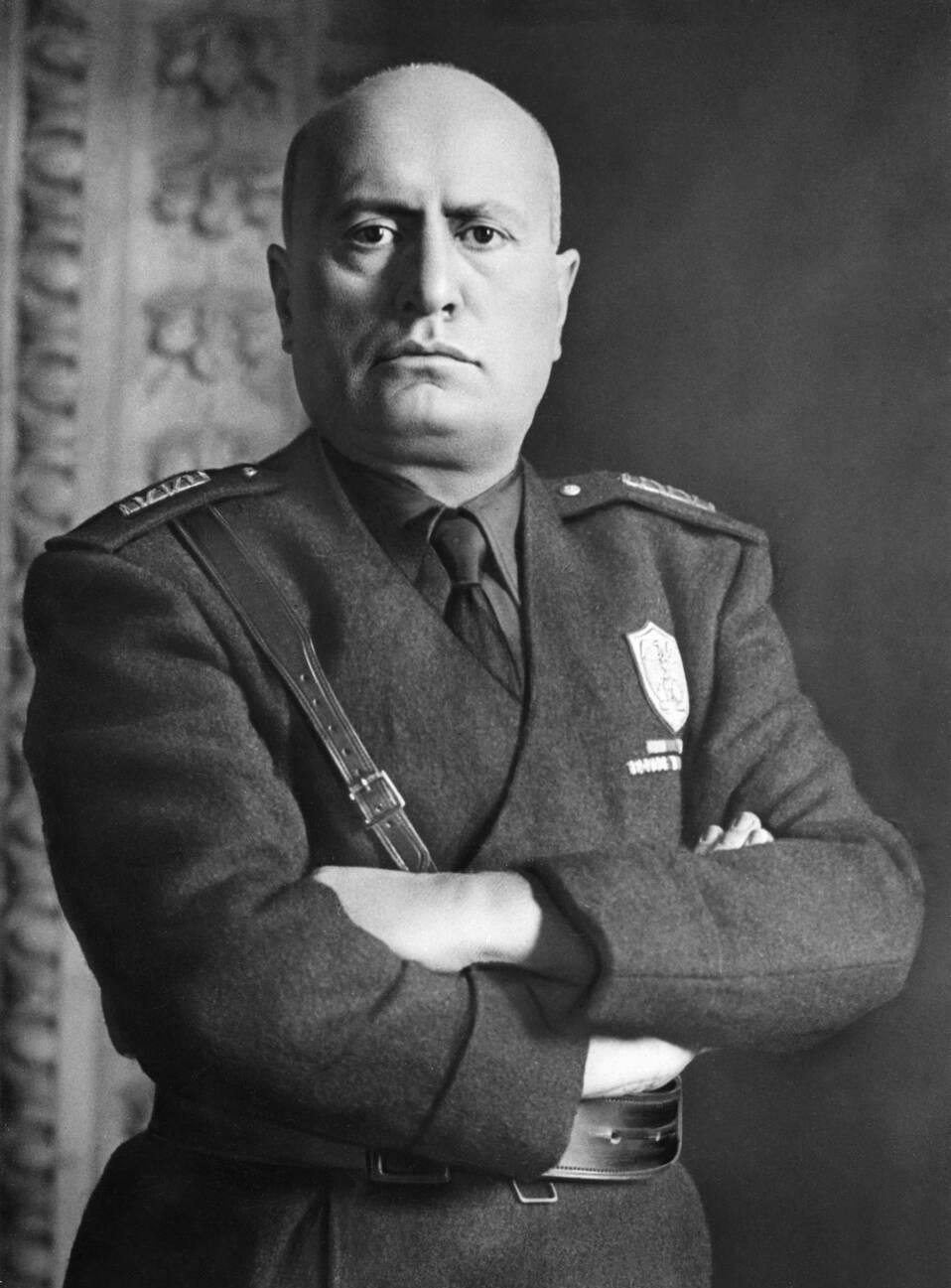
October 31, 1922: Fascist leader Benito Mussolini becomes Prime Minister of Italy

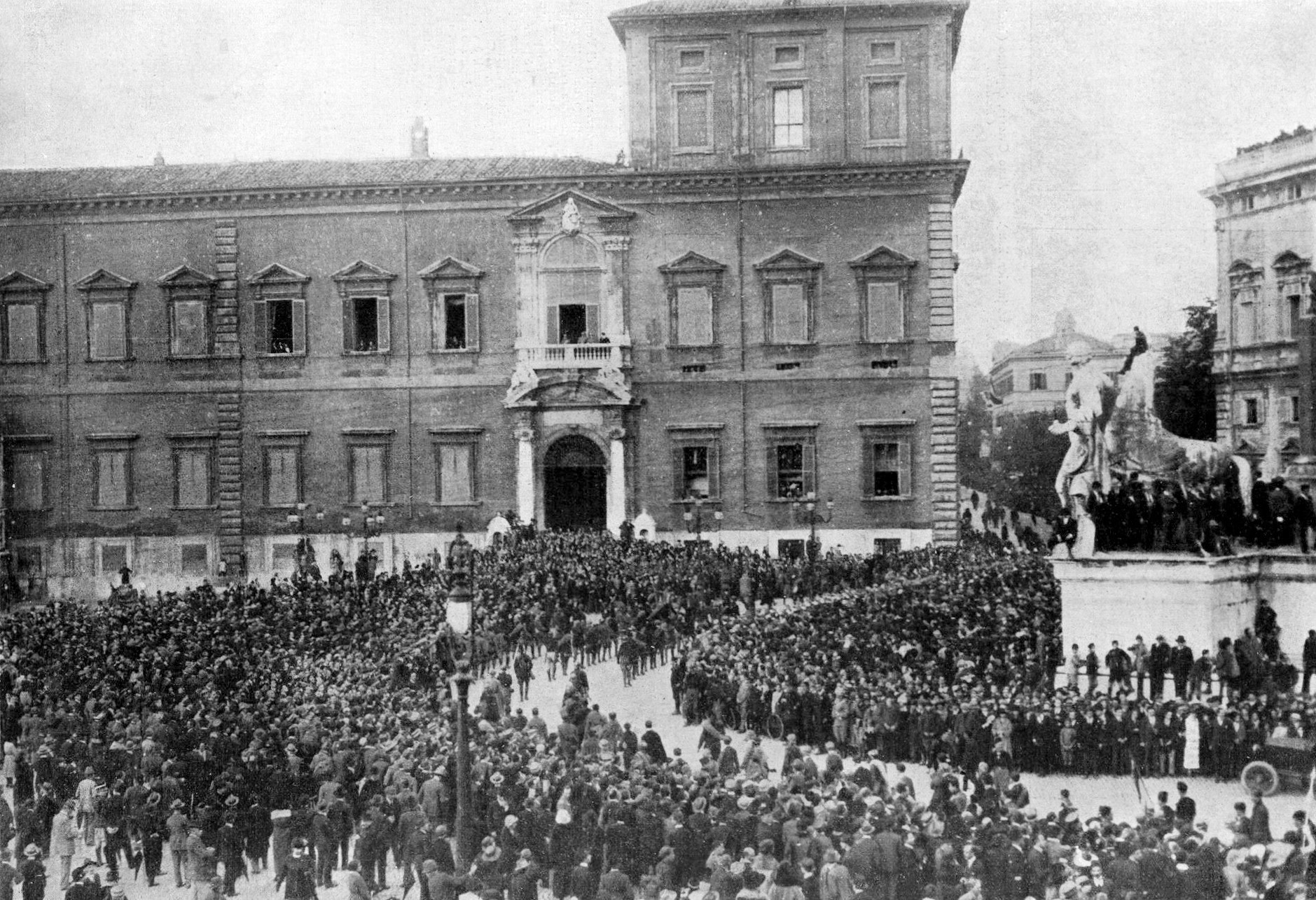
October 27, 1922: Italian Fascists begin the March on Rome

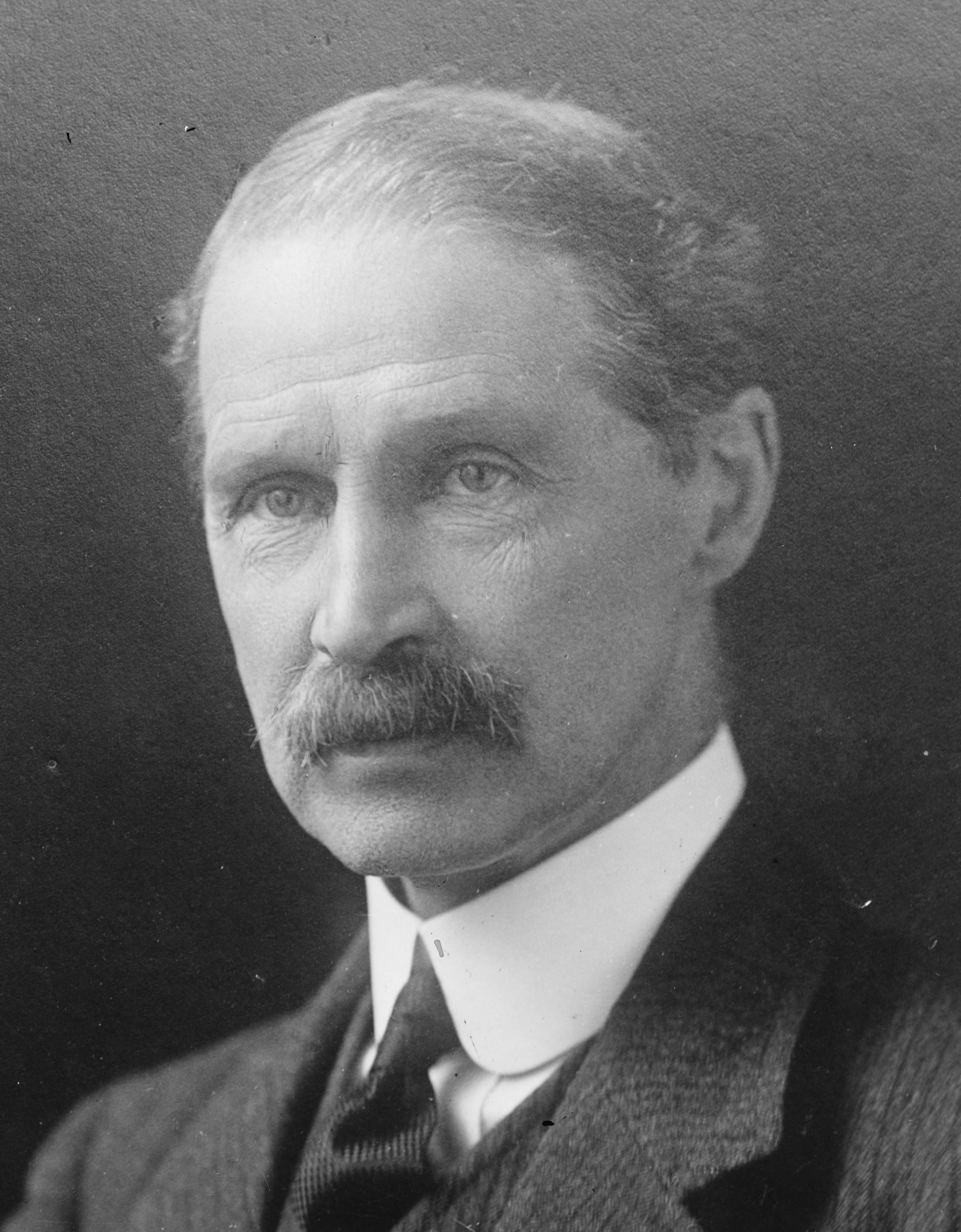
October 23, 1922: Bonar Law becomes new Prime Minister of the United Kingdom

The following events occurred in October 1922:

== October 1, 1922 (Sunday) ==
- Fascists in Italy marched on Bolzano demanding the resignation of its German-speaking mayor, the introduction of Italian into schools and public offices, and bilingualism on all public signs and notices. By October 3 they had complete control of the city.
- In accordance with the results of the 1920 Carinthian plebiscite, exchanges were made of territory between the Republic of Austria and the Kingdom of Yugoslavia. Austria ceded the area around Leifling, which became Libeliče in what is now Slovenia, and Yugoslavia ceded Rabštajn (now Rabenstein) and Šentlovrenc (now Lorenzenberg).
- The Republic of Lithuania introduced its own currency, the litas, replacing the German ostmark and the German ostrubel. The litas coin was designed to have 0.150462 grams of pure gold in order for it to be valued at one-tenth of a U.S. dollar.
- Walter Simons was appointed as the Chief Judge of Germany's Supreme Court, the Reichsgericht.
- The White House Police Force was created by order of U.S. President Warren G. Harding. Placed under the jurisdiction of the U.S. Secret Service in 1930, it is now the United States Secret Service Uniformed Division. Initially the President or his appointed representative supervised the force.
- American-born dancer Isadora Duncan and her husband the Russian poet Sergei Yesenin were detained trying to enter the United States. They were not allowed to enter until authorities were satisfied that they had not come for the purposes of spreading communist propaganda.
- Born:
  - Chen-Ning Yang, Chinese-born American physicist and Nobel laureate; in Hefei
  - Hans Stern, German-born Brazilian jeweler and founder of the H. Stern chain of luxury jewelry stores; in Essen (d. 2007)
  - Burke Marshall, U.S. civil rights lawyer; in Plainfield, New Jersey (d. 2003)

== October 2, 1922 (Monday) ==
- Soviet Russia introduced conscription for all male citizens upon reaching the age of 20.
- Isadora Duncan and Sergei Yesenin were permitted to enter the United States after being detained at Ellis Island for twenty-four hours.

== October 3, 1922 (Tuesday) ==
- The Convention of Mudanya began as representatives of the Allied Powers and Turkey met to negotiate an end to the Chanak Crisis in the wake of Turkey's victory over Greece in the Greco-Turkish War.
- Ireland offered an amnesty to all irregulars who voluntarily surrendered their arms and ceased to engage in rebellious activities before October 15. Upon the expiration of the amnesty, the Irish Free State government authorized its military to begin the mass arrest of Irish republicans caught with illegal weapons.
- Italian Fascist Party activists took over the city of Bolzano and deposed Mayor Julius Perathoner, who had led the municipality since 1895 when it was the Austrian city of Bozen and then continued after its annexation by Italy following World War I.
- Ratifications of the "Little Entente" treaty between Czechoslovakia and the Kingdom of Serbs, Croats and Slovenes, signed on were exchanged. Both nations had earlier signed treaties with Romania.
- Died: Gregory of Kydonies, 57-58, Greek Orthodox bishop of the Anatolian city of Kydonies, honored as a martyred Saint in the Greek Orthodox Church; executed by the Turkish Land Forces along with other Orthodox priests after Kydonies was re-conquered by the Turks (b. 1864)

== October 4, 1922 (Wednesday) ==
- The Austrian government signed the Geneva Protocol, securing a major loan from the UK, France, Italy and Czechoslovakia in exchange for renouncing a political alliance with Germany.
- Ireland offered an amnesty to all irregulars who voluntarily surrendered their arms and ceased to engage in rebellious activities before October 15.
- The Allied and Turkish representatives at Mudanya agreed to allow Turkey to have all of Thrace and to place Constantinople under joint control.
- Radio Dunedin began broadcasting as the first radio station in New Zealand.
- Russian Bolshevik agitator Pyotr Kobozev was inaugurated as the fourth, and last Chairman of the Council of Ministers (Prime Minister) of the Far Eastern Republic, to preside over the Republic's annexation into the Soviet Union.
- The value of the German mark continued its fall and dropped to less than 1/20th of an American penny, as the exchange rate closed at 2,127.33 marks to a U.S. dollar.
- Fascists seized control of Trento.
- Born:
  - Dr. Donald Ross, South African-born British heart surgeon who developed the Ross procedure for using a patient's own pulmonary valve to replace a defective aortic valve, and then using a donor pulmonary valve to replace the one taken; in Kimberley, Northern Cape (d. 2014)
  - Saint Gianna Beretta Molla, Italian pediatrician canonized as a Roman Catholic saint in 2004; in Magenta, Lombardy (d. 1962)
  - Malcolm Baldrige Jr., United States Secretary of Commerce for President Ronald Reagan from 1981 until his accidental death in a rodeo accident in 1987; in Omaha, Nebraska.

== October 5, 1922 (Thursday) ==
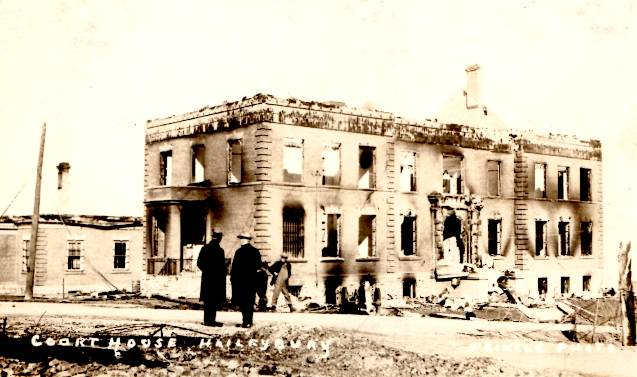
Ruins in Haileybury

- Forest fires in the Canadian provinces of Ontario and Quebec killed 43 people, as well as burning 650 square miles (1,700 km^{2}) of property. The blaze destroyed the communities of Haileybury and North Cobalt, Charlton, Thornloe and Heaslip in Ontario, and Notre-Dame-du-Nord and its neighbor, Notre-Dame-des-Quinze in Quebec. Rain and snow fell later in the day and put out the fires before they could spread further.
- The congress of the Italian Socialist Party in Rome descended into fistfights over the question of whether a communist revolution in Italy was still possible or desirable. This conference was the catalyst for the creation of the splinter party called the United Socialist Party.
- Game 2 of the World Series between the New York Yankees and New York Giants ended in a 3 to 3 tie, after ten innings. Umpire George Hildebrand called the game due to darkness at 4:43 p.m. even though the sun did not set that day for another 50 minutes. Hundreds of fans at the Giants' stadium, the Polo Grounds (attendance was 37,020), surrounded the field box of Commissioner Kenesaw Mountain Landis shouting threats and jeers at the decision. That night after a conference with the owners of both ballclubs, Landis announced that the $120,554 in gate receipts would be donated to disabled soldiers and sailors and New York charities. Only two other World Series had games end in a tie (in 1907 and in 1912), and although regular season games ended in a tie as late as 2016, a postseason draw never happened again.
- Born:
  - Robert Vallée, French cyberneticist and mathematician; in Poitiers (d. 2017)
  - José Froilán González, Argentine racing driver; in Arrecifes (d. 2013)
  - Jock Stein, Scottish football manager; in Burnbank (d. 1985)
  - Woodrow Parfrey, American character actor on film and TV; in New York City (d. 1984)

== October 6, 1922 (Friday) ==
- At the direction of U.S. President Warren G. Harding, U.S. Attorney General Harry M. Daugherty ordered liquor off of all American ships throughout the world and prohibited foreign ships carrying liquor from entering American waters. The new regulations went into effect eight days later, on October 14. A Supreme Court decision in 1923 would allow American ships three miles outside of American waters to sell liquor.
- Two U.S. Army pilots set a new record by staying in the air for almost one-and-a-half days, landing at Rockwell Field in California, near San Diego at 5:11 in the afternoon, 35 hours and 18 minutes after they had gone up from the same field before six in the morning the day before. During their time in the air, John A. Macready and Oakley G. Kelly spent the time circling San Diego in a Fokker T-2 monoplane and had enough fuel to stay aloft longer but chose to land before sunset. The previous record had been 26 hours.

== October 7, 1922 (Saturday) ==
- The United Kingdom and France agreed to Turkey's demand to be allowed to annex Eastern Thrace, formerly Greek territory that had been conquered by Turkey in the Greco-Turkish War, on condition that Greek troops in the area be allowed 30 days to withdraw while Allied troops occupied the region. The move came a day after Ismet Inonu issued a demand on behalf of Turkey to allow troops to occupy Eastern Thrace immediately.
- Mrs. Rebecca Latimer Felton became the first woman to be appointed as a United States Senator, as Georgia Governor Thomas W. Hardwick presented the necessary papers to signify her appointment to replace the late Thomas E. Watson, who had died on September 26. In that there were no scheduled sessions remaining for the U.S. Senate, Governor Hardwick requested U.S. President Warren G. Harding to call a special session of Congress in order for Mrs. Felton, the 87-year-old widow of former Congressman William H. Felton, to take office. The session took place on November 21 and Mrs. Felton was sworn in for a single day. Walter F. George, who had defeated Hardwick in a special senatorial election on October 17, was sworn in the next day.
- Antonín Švehla became Prime Minister of Czechoslovakia.
- Died: Marie Lloyd, 52, English music hall singer

== October 8, 1922 (Sunday) ==
- The New York Giants defeated the New York Yankees 5 to 3, to win their second straight World Series, four games to none with one tie.
- Miss Lillian Gatlin arrived in an airplane at 5:45 in the evening at Curtiss Field near Mineola, New York, becoming the first woman to cross the continental United States in an airplane, albeit as a passenger. The De Havilland 400 horsepower airplane was piloted by Elmer G. Leonhardt from San Francisco to New York City with nine stops in between, in order to support her unsuccessful campaign to have March 2 of every year to be a holiday to commemorate the death of U.S. flyers.

== October 9, 1922 (Monday) ==
- Nineteen-year-old Clifford Hayes was arrested and charged with first-degree murder in the Hall-Mills case. He would be released a month later and his accuser charged with perjury.
- The comic strip Fritzi Ritz, written and drawn by Larry Whittington, first appeared in newspapers as an offering of United Feature Syndicate. On May 14, 1925, the strip was taken over by Ernie Bushmiller, and on January 2, 1933, a new character, Fritzi's 8-year-old niece Nancy, was introduced, gradually becoming the focus of the daily strip, which was renamed for her. Fritzi Ritz continued as a Sunday comic until 1967.
- Born:
  - Major General Asaf Simhoni, Israeli Defense Forces commander in the successful Sinai War in 1956, but who died in an accident while on his way back from the victory parade; in Nahalal (d. 1956)
  - Fyvush Finkel, American actor, in Brooklyn, New York City (d. 2016)
  - Olga Guillot, Cuban singer, in Santiago de Cuba (d. 2010)
  - Alan R. White, Canadian-born British analytic philosopher; in Toronto (d. 1992)

== October 10, 1922 (Tuesday) ==
- Great Britain and Iraq signed the Anglo-Iraqi Treaty of 1922 to create "Irak" as an independent kingdom from former Ottoman Empire territory within the League of Nations Mandate for Mesopotamia. Iraq was allowed limited self-government while Britain controlled its foreign relations.
- Members of the Irish Republican Army were condemned by bishops of the Roman Catholic Church of Ireland and an order was issued to deny the sacraments of the Church to rebels, and threatening to suspend priests who aided rebels. The decision came after the meeting of the bishops at St Patrick's College, Maynooth near Dublin. "It is most inconceivable how decent irish boys could degenerate so tragically and reconcile such methods of criminality with their duties to God and Ireland," the bishops stated in a pastoral letter to Ireland's Catholic churches.
- The Karenni States (Bawlake, Kantarawaddy, and Kyebogyi) were placed under the administration of the Federated Shan States, established in 1900 within the northeastern portion of the British Empire's colony of Burma to handle the various princely states as one geographical unit. The federation would be split into the Shan State and the Kayah State in 1948 with the founding of the independent Union of Burma (now the Union of Myanmar).
- In the U.S., the acquisition by Bethlehem Steel of the Lackawanna Steel Company was finalized and made Bethlehem the second-largest steel company in the world. U.S. Steel remained the largest company.
- PWX began broadcasting in Havana as the first regular radio station in Cuba.
- Born:
  - Merv Pregulman, American football player, businessman and philanthropist, inductee to the College Football Hall of Fame; in Lansing, Michigan (d. 2012)
  - Wilhelmina Holladay, American art collector and co-founder of the National Museum of Women in the Arts; in Elmira, New York (d. 2021)
- Died:
  - Arnold Ehret, 56, German-born U.S. nutritionist and alternative health medicine advocate of the "mucusless diet"; from a head injury sustained when he fell while walking
  - Luisa Capetillo, 42, Puerto Rican labor organizer and women's rights advocate; from tuberculosis

== October 11, 1922 (Wednesday) ==
- The Armistice of Mudanya was signed after midnight between Turkey and the Allied powers to end the Greco-Turkish War, after an agreement was reached between the parties at 11:00 pm local time the day before (20:00 UTC) in the town of Mudanya in Turkey. İsmet İnönü signed on behalf of the Grand National Assembly of Turkey while Lieutenant General Charles Harington Harington and French General Charles Antoine Charpy signed for Britain and France, respectively. Greece would agree to recognize Turkish claims to Smyrna and eastern Thrace and was given 15 days to withdraw west of the Maritsa River. A mass exodus began in Thrace, as Greeks and Armenians who feared living under the Turks fled westward. In return, Turkey agreed to abolish the Sultanate permanently and to exile 150 former Ottoman Empire officials.
- Fascists invaded the offices of the Housing Commissioner in Rome and had all the women clerks dismissed and replaced with ex-service men. The Fascists sent a letter to Prime Minister Facta stating they had taken justice into their own hands.
- Born:
  - Thomas Hal Phillips, American novelist and screenwriter; in Alcorn County, Mississippi (d. 2007)
  - Nonda (artistic name of Epaminondas "Nonda" Papadopoulos), Greek painter and sculptor; in Athens (d. 2005)
- Died: Anton Kolm, 57, Austrian film director

== October 12, 1922 (Thursday) ==
- Marcelo Torcuato de Alvear was inaugurated to a six-year term as the President of Argentina.
- The Los Angeles Steamship Company liner City of Honolulu, formerly the German ocean liner SS Friedrich der Grosse, caught fire on its first voyage, 670 miles southwest of San Pedro, California. All aboard were rescued and the ship was abandoned to sink.

== October 13, 1922 (Friday) ==
- France released its last German prisoners of war, eight years after World War I had started in 1914 and almost four years after the Armistice of 1918.
- France founded its Colony of Niger to govern members of the Hausa and the Songhai and Zarma ethnic groups within French West Africa. Colonial rule would continue until the Republic of Niger's independence in 1960.

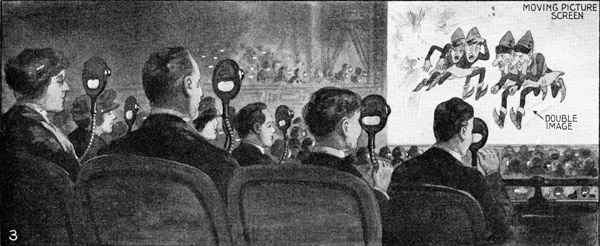
3-D glasses in 1922

- The 3-D silent film Mars Calling, with a 95-minute running time was presented in New York City's Selwyn Theatre to demonstrate the Teleview process invented by Laurens Hammond. The process used alternate frame sequencing viewable with motorized stereopticons used by the audience and ran at the Selwyn Theatre for a few weeks.
- Born: Nathaniel "Sweetwater" Clifton, American professional basketball player, one of the first African Americans to play in the National Basketball Association; as Clifton Nathaniel, in England, Arkansas, United States (d. 1990)

== October 14, 1922 (Saturday) ==
- The government of Greece acceded to the terms of the October 11 Armistice of Mudanya, ceding Greece's territories east of the Maritsa River to Turkey, including Adrianople, Dardanella, Sarànta Ekklisiès and Rhaedestos (which became Edirne, Çanakkale, Kırklareli and Tekirdağ respectively).
- The conspirators in the Walther Rathenau assassination who were still alive were given sentences of up to 15 years in prison. Ernst Werner Techow received the maximum penalty.
- A group of terrorists of the U.S. Ku Klux Klan kidnapped Theodore Schierlman, the mayor of the small town of Liberty, Kansas from his office after he had publicly denounced the Klan, took him four miles out of town and beat him with a whip 30 times before warning him of a worse fate if he spoke out again. Kansas Governor Henry J. Allen ordered an investigation by the state attorney general and said "The responsibility rests on the shoulders of those who employ the disguise and preach the right of mobs to take the law in their hands."
- Born: Eugene Goldwasser, American biochemist who developed the process to synthesize the hormone erythropoietin (EPO) to produce red blood cells as a cure for anemia; in Brooklyn, New York (d. 2010)

== October 15, 1922 (Sunday) ==
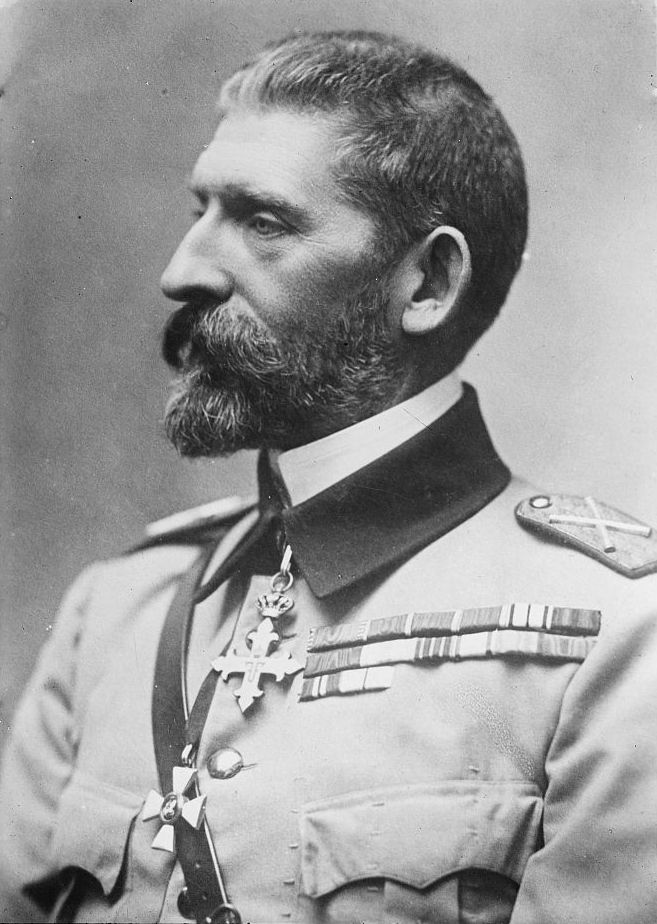
King Ferdinand

- Ferdinand I was formally crowned King of Romania and his wife Marie was crowned as his Queen consort, in an elaborate ceremony at the Coronation Cathedral in Alba Iulia.
- Upon the expiration of an amnesty, the Irish Free State Government authorised its military to begin the mass arrest of Irish republicans caught with illegal weapons.
- New York City inaugurated direct dial phone service for the first time, taking the switchboard operator out of the PEnnsylvania exchange at one minute after midnight "for local calls by means of dials instead of giving numbers orally" About 1,700 phones had the dial capability, including those at the Pennsylvania Hotel and the Waldorf Hotel.
- Born:
  - Luigi Giussani, Italian Catholic priest who started the "Communion and Liberation" movement in 1954; in Desio (d. 2005)
  - Tommy Edwards, African-American singer and songwriter known for "It's All in the Game"; in Richmond, Virginia (d. 1969 from cirrhosis of the liver)
  - Mary V. Ahern, American TV and radio producer; in Cambridge, Massachusetts (d. 2021)
- Died: James Hastings, 70, Scottish Protestant minister and Biblical scholar known for producing Hastings' Dictionary of the Bible and the Encyclopædia of Religion and Ethics, and establishing the academic journal Expository Times.

== October 16, 1922 (Monday) ==
- A mandatory population exchange between Greece and Turkey was proposed to the League of Nations by former Greek Prime Minister Eleftherios Venizelos as a means of avoiding further massacres of Christians and Muslims who had been made refugees during the Greco-Turkish War. Venizelos asked that Fridtjof Nansen of Norway, the League's High Commissioner for Refugees and winner of the Nobel Peace Prize, oversee the operation. The "Convention Concerning the Exchange of Greek and Turkish Populations" would be carried out in 1923 with over 1.6 million people (1.2 million Greek Orthodox civilians in Turkey, and 400,000 Muslims in Greece) being moved.
- U.S. Bureau of Prohibition agents made their first seizure of a foreign ship transporting liquor, capturing the Canadian schooner Emerald 8 miles (13 km) off of the coast of New Jersey and prompting a protest by the British Embassy. An attache of the British Embassy protested that the Emerald was not using its own boats to transport rum to the Jersey shore, but unloading it instead to other boats. Ambassador Auckland Geddes informed the United States that Britain rejected the American proposal to be given the right to search British ships within 12 miles of American shores.
- The construction and installation of the 30 cm Irving Porter Church Memorial Telescope was completed at Cornell University's Fuertes Observatory.
- Died: Florence Kate Upton, 49, American-born British children's author who created the "Golliwog" doll, died from complications after surgery

== October 17, 1922 (Tuesday) ==
- U.S. Navy Lieutenant Virgil C. Griffin became the first pilot to make a takeoff from an American aircraft carrier, departing from the carrier USS Langley (at anchor in the York River) in a VE-7 "Bluebird" biplane and landing at an airfield. Eugene Ely had been the first to pilot an airplane off of a U.S. ship, departing from a "temporary platform" 83 feet (25 m) long, erected over the bow of the light cruiser USS Birmingham on November 14, 1910, before the first aircraft carriers had been built.
- The first Los Angeles County Fair, one of the largest county fairs in the United States, began six days of operation, taking place in the county at Pomona, California.
- All 29 crew of the Netherlands steamer Cornelis drowned when the ship and its lifeboats sank in a gale while grounded on rocks in the Gulf of Bothnia near Sweden. Reportedly, the captain refused offers of aid from persons on shore, and the ship was unreachable when the gale reached it.
- The U.S. Army's largest airship, the dirigible C-2, exploded and was destroyed by fire as it was preparing for takeoff at Brooks Field near San Antonio, Texas. C-2, with hydrogen gas providing its buoyancy, had been on its way back from California to Virginia after making the first transcontinental flight across the U.S. in September. Seven of the eight crew on board were injured when they jumped from the hangar.
- With no prospect of salvage, the ruined ocean liner SS City of Honolulu was deliberately sunk by the U.S. Coast Guard cutter Shawnee off of the California coast, five days after its passengers and crew were rescued from a fire at sea.
- Born: Luiz Bonfá, Brazilian composer and guitarist; in Rio de Janeiro (d. 2001)

== October 18, 1922 (Wednesday) ==
- The British Broadcasting Company, Ltd., a short-lived British commercial company unrelated to the British Broadcasting Corporation (BBC), was incorporated by four British and two American companies (including General Electric and Western Electric) for radio broadcasts in Britain, and began broadcasting four weeks later on November 14. The company would go bankrupt in 1926 and its assets and BBC trademark would be bought by the British government.

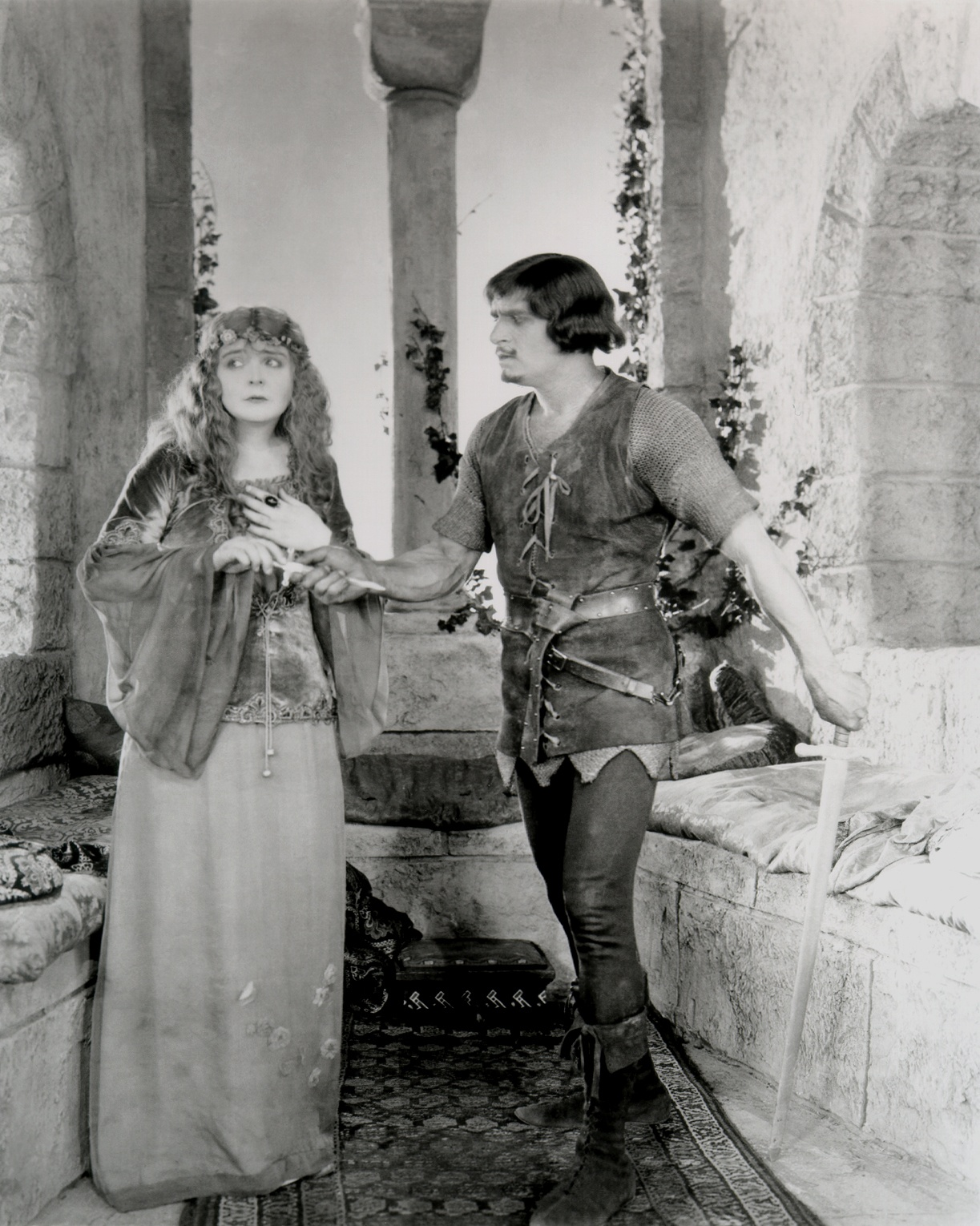
Fairbanks as Robin Hood

- U.S. Army Brigadier General Billy Mitchell set the new official flight airspeed record as he piloted a Curtiss R-6 at a speed of 224.05 miles per hour (360.57 km/h) at Selfridge Field near Mount Clemens, Michigan, as recognized by the Fédération Aéronautique Internationale (FAI). Army Lieutenant R. L. Maughan had flown at 248.5 miles per hour (399.9 km/h) on October 16, "traveling at a greater speed than any human being ever attained as timed electrically by the U.S. Army but the FAI refused to accept the record.
- The most popular film of the year, Robin Hood, premiered in Chicago. Starring Douglas Fairbanks in the title role, the film ran 2 hours and 7 minutes on 11 reels, and earned $2.5 million in North America.
- Died:
  - August Gaul, 52, German sculptor, died of cancer
  - Marie Grisier-Montbazon, 63, French actress and singer

== October 19, 1922 (Thursday) ==
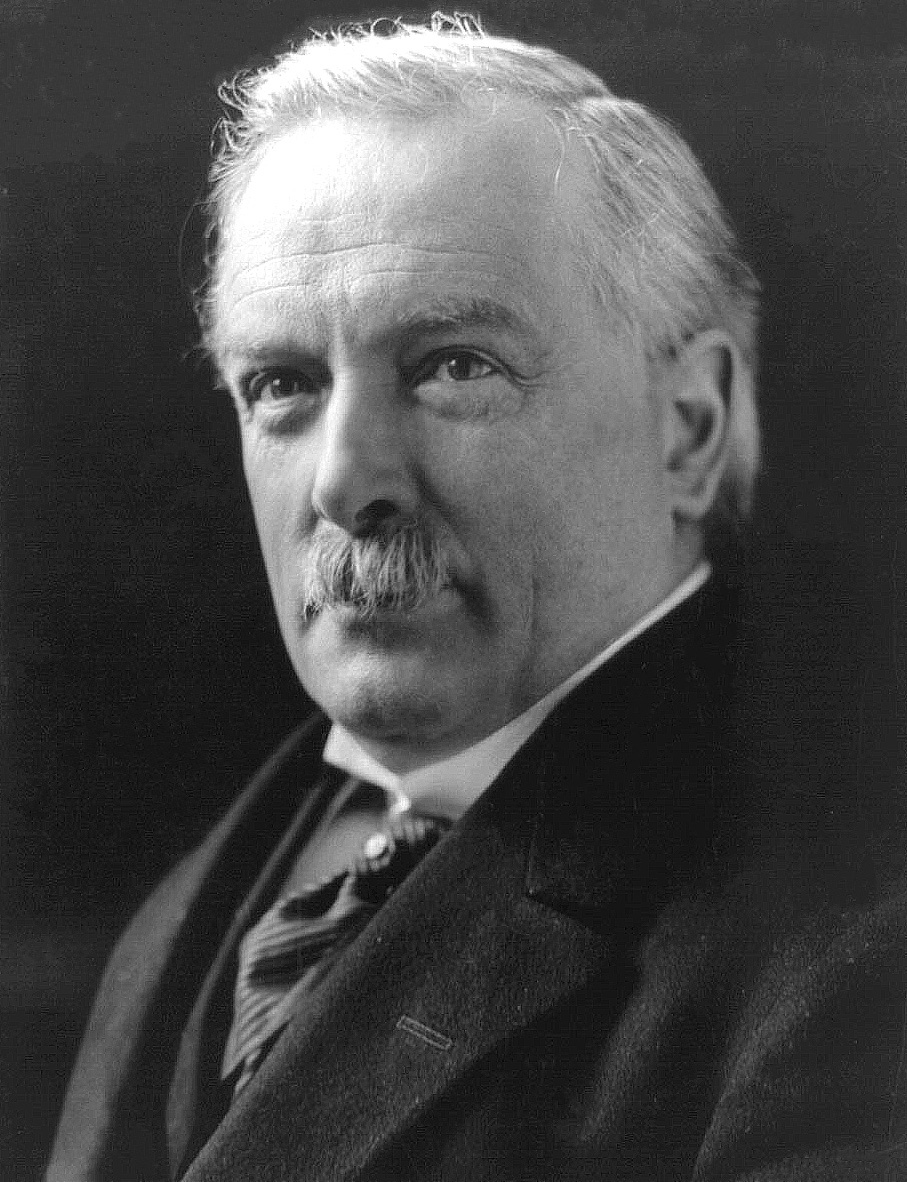
Lloyd George

- The Conservative Party members of parliament in the United Kingdom gathered for the Carlton Club meeting to discuss whether to end their role in a coalition government with Prime Minister David Lloyd George's Liberal Party. The Conservatives voted, 186 to 87, to end their participation, bringing the downfall of the coalition government. Lloyd George handed his resignation as Prime Minister to King George V that day.
- Born:
  - Jack Anderson, U.S. investigative journalist and newspaper columnist; in Long Beach, California (d. 2005)
  - Benjamin Franklin Scott, African-American chemist and technician on the secret Manhattan Project during World War II; in Florence, South Carolina (d. 2000)
  - Ebrahim Golestan, Iranian filmmaker, in Shiraz (d. 2023)
- Died:
  - Gavin Campbell, 1st Marquess of Breadalbane, 71, Scottish nobleman and former Lord Steward of the Household, 1892 to 1895
  - Sir William Meyer, 62, British High Commissioner for India since 1920

== October 20, 1922 (Friday) ==
- U.S. Army test pilot Harold R. Harris became the first pilot to make an emergency escape of a falling airplane by parachute, bailing out after his Loening airplane went out of control over Dayton, Ohio. He landed in the backyard of a house at 335 Troy Street. His plane crashed at 403 Valley Street, a few blocks away, without injuring bystanders. Passengers had parachuted from piloted airplanes in non-emergencies since 1911. The Caterpillar Club, created by two Dayton reporters to honor persons "who have successfully used a parachute to bail out of a disabled aircraft", admitted Harris as its first member.
- Born:
  - Franco Ventriglia, American opera singer; in Fairfield, Connecticut (d. 2012)
  - Gaositwe Chiepe, one of the most powerful women in the African nation of Botswana and its Foreign Minister from 1984 to 1994; in the Bechuanaland Protectorate (d. 2025)
- Died:
  - Freeman Thorpe, 78, American portrait painter who was commissioned for portraits of five U.S. presidents and other famous Americans
  - Count Stephan Burián von Rajecz, 71, Austro-Hungarian Foreign Minister during World War I
  - Carl Strehlow, 50, German-born Australian anthropologist and missionary; from dropsy.
  - Adam "Stovepipe" Johnson, 88, American frontiersman and Confederate Army general, blinded during the Civil War

== October 21, 1922 (Saturday) ==
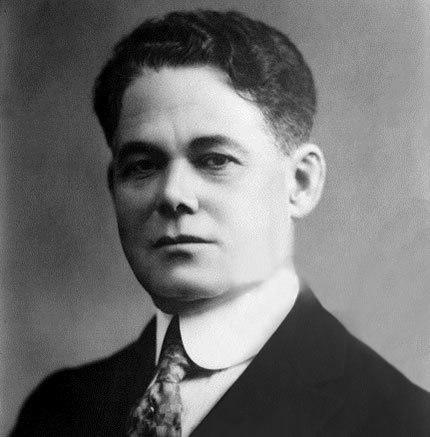
President Vicini

- Juan Bautista Vicini Burgos became the provisional president of the Dominican Republic as the U.S. administration of the country formally ended.
- The championship of the Victorian Football League in Australian rules football was won by the Fitzroy Maroons, who defeated the Collingwood Magpies with 11 six-point goals and 13 behinds (79 points) to the Magpies' 9 goals, 14 behinds (64 points).
- Former Emperor of China Puyi married Gobulo Wanrong at a royal wedding staged in the Republic of China at the Forbidden City.
- Born: Liliane Bettencourt, French businesswoman and heiress to the L'Oréal cosmetics company, and the richest woman in the world (US$44.3 billion) at the time of her death; as Liliane Schueller in Paris (d. 2017)

== October 22, 1922 (Sunday) ==
- An arsonist killed 15 people by setting fire to a five-story apartment building in New York City early in the morning.
- Italy's Minister of War, Marcello Soleri, concerned that the Fascists would attempt a takeover of the government, issued an order to all military commanders to be prepared to assume necessary powers for the defense of Rome and the maintenance of public order, but did not receive support from Prime Minister Facta.
- In Berlin, German engineer Heinrich Schieferstein demonstrated "the tickless clock... one of the boons promised humanity" at a press conference, a noiseless timepiece operated with an oscillating motor.
- Brazil won the South American Championship of football with a 3–0 win over Paraguay.
- Born: John Chafee, Governor of Rhode Island, U.S. Secretary of the Navy and later U.S. Senator; in Providence, Rhode Island (d. 1999)

== October 23, 1922 (Monday) ==
- Bonar Law was unanimously elected leader of the Conservative Party and then went to Buckingham Palace where he accepted the invitation of George V to take over as Prime Minister of the United Kingdom. Law was the first UK Prime Minister to have been born outside the British Isles, having been born in Canada in Rexton, New Brunswick in 1858.
- Italy and Yugoslavia signed the Treaty of Santa Margherita, which reaffirmed the Treaty of Rapello and the independence of the Free State of Fiume.
- Chancellor Joseph Wirth submitted a question for cabinet council discussion asking whether Germany should declare bankruptcy.
- The census of Palestine, which contained the modern State of Israel was carried out by Britain and reported a count of 757,182 people, of which nearly 591,000 were Muslims and a little more than 73,000 were Jewish.
- The mystery film One Exciting Night premiered at New York City's Apollo.
- Born:
  - Kiyoshi Ogawa, Japanese kamikaze pilot who killed 434 U.S. servicemen in a suicide attack on the aircraft carrier USS Bunker Hill; in Gunma Prefecture (d. 1945)
  - Coleen Gray (stage name for Doris Bernice Jensen), American film actress known for Red River and The Killing; in Staplehurst, Nebraska (d. 2015)

== October 24, 1922 (Tuesday) ==
- Benito Mussolini made a speech to 60,000 of his Blackshirt followers at the annual Fascist Party convention in Naples declaring, "Either we are allowed to govern, or we will seize power by marching on Rome." The march began three days later and brought Mussolini to power by the end of the week.
- Germany's Reichstag voted, 310 to 77, to postpone the 1924 presidential elections for one year, due to unrest in the nation, and to extend the term of President Friedrich Ebert further, to June 30, 1925, though Ebert would die before the completion of his term.
- Former German chancellor Bernhard von Bülow gave his first interview in seven years, in which he said there was no chance for the monarchy to be restored in Germany because "The republican majority is stronger than the nationalists." Of the country's economic problems he said that they "may lead to local riots, but from all I know of the German people I can say that they are too fond of quiet and order to allow bolshevism to sway the country."
- Born:
  - Werner Buchholz, German-born American computer scientist who coined the term "byte" to describe the number of bits necessary to create a single character in a computer; in Detmold (d. 2019)
  - Ratilal Chandaria, Kenyan-born Indian philanthropist an industrialist who modernized the Gujarati language; in Nairobi (d. 2013)
- Died: George Cadbury, 83, British businessman and philanthropist

== October 25, 1922 (Wednesday) ==
- Russian troops under the command of Ieronim Uborevich were able to recapture the city of Vladivostok in the far eastern part of the nation, as former Imperial Russian General Mikhail Diterikhs and his troops retreated and were evacuated by Japanese ships. With the loss of Vladivostok, Japan completed the withdrawal of its remaining occupational forces from the Russian mainland, after starting the pullout on June 24.
- In Ireland, the Dáil Éireann voted to approve the Irish Free State Constitution Act 1922 as a followup to its approval of the 1921 Anglo-Irish Treaty negotiated between Irish nationalists and the British government. The new constitution became effective on December 6 by proclamation of King George V and created the Irish Free State as an independent and "co-equal" member of the British Commonwealth.
- Responding to the pro-treaty vote that created the Irish Free State as an independent nation in the British Commonwealth, the Irish Republican Army (IRA) declared its formation of a republican government with Éamon de Valera as "President of Ireland" (including Northern Ireland), a cabinet of ministers and a 12-member Council of State. By then, the IRA had lost control of its strongholds in County Cork and other parts of Ireland.
- After beginning its takeover of governments in northern Italy, the Fascist Party, led by Benito Mussolini, delivered an ultimatum to the Italian government in which it demanded that it surrender all of its powers to them in order to prevent the March on Rome. In a farewell to the Fascists at Naples, Mussolini declared that "I take a solemn oath that either the Government of the country must be given peacefully to the Fascisti or we will take it by force."
- Prince Andrew of Greece, a Major General of the Greek Army, son of the late King George I and the father of the Prince Philippos, the future Prince Consort of the United Kingdom, was arrested at his home on the island of Corfu and charged with contributing to the disastrous loss by Greece in the Greco-Turkish War. Unlike other officers who were sentenced to long prison terms or executed, Andrew would be allowed to leave the country with his family after British intervention.
- Born:
  - Basile Adjou Moumouni, Beninese (Dahomeyan) physician who won the May 1968 Dahomeyan presidential election but never took office because the results were annulled due to a boycott of almost three-fourths of the voters; in Cotonou (d. 2019)
  - Nicholas Van Slyck, American classical music composer; in Philadelphia (d. 1983)
- Died:
  - Oscar Hertwig, 73, German zoologist and professor
  - Lloyd Warren, 52, American architect and founder (in 1916) of the Beaux-Arts Institute of Design in New York City, was killed after he fell out of a window of his sixth-floor apartment while he was sleepwalking.

== October 26, 1922 (Thursday) ==
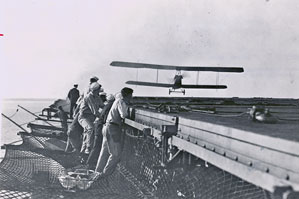
Chevalier lands the USS Langley

- Italy's prime minister Luigi Facta and his ministers formally turned in their resignations to King Victor Emmanuel III.
- The first landing of an airplane on an American aircraft carrier was made by U.S. Navy Lieutenant Commander Godfrey Chevalier, who piloted an Aeromarine 39 on to the USS Langley as the ship was moving. E. H. Dunning of Britain's Royal Naval Air Service had been the first person to land an airplane on a moving ship when he touched down on the deck of HMS Furious on August 2, 1917.
- King George V dissolved the British Parliament and scheduled new elections for November 15.
- Born:
  - Juli Lynne Charlot, American fashion designer who created the poodle skirt; in New York City (d. 2024)
  - Madelyn Dunham, maternal grandmother of future U.S. president Barack Obama; in Peru, Kansas (d. 2008)

== October 27, 1922 (Friday) ==
- The British colony of Southern Rhodesia (now the nation of Zimbabwe) held a referendum on whether or not it was to be joined with South Africa. With only white voters being allowed to participate, they overwhelmingly voted (59 percent to 41 percent) in favor of Rhodesia's continuation as a separate British colony instead of joining the Union of South Africa.
- Fascists in Italy mobilized and took possession of various cities around the country as the March on Rome truly began, though Mussolini remained in Milan. Among the cities that fell during the day were Florence, Pisa and Cremona.
- Born:
  - Ruby Dee (stage name for Ruby Ann Wallace), African-American stage, film and TV actress and activist; in Cleveland, Ohio (d. 2014);
  - Poul Bundgaard, Danish singer, comedian and film and TV character actor known for portraying "Kjeld Jensen" in 15 "Olsen Gang" films; in Hellerup (d. 1998)
  - Ralph Kiner, American baseball outfielder who led the National League in home runs for seven consecutive years, later inducted into the Hall of Fame; in Santa Rita, New Mexico (d. 2014)
- Died:
  - Rita Fornia (stage name for Regina Newman), 44, American opera singer
  - Julian Onderdonk, 40, American impressionist painter

== October 28, 1922 (Saturday) ==
- The first nationally broadcast football game was transmitted by KYW in Chicago and WEAF in New York City as the Princeton University Tigers and the University of Chicago Maroons, both unbeaten, played in Chicago. The Maroons had an 18 to 7 lead until the fourth quarter, and Princeton came back to win, 21 to 18.
- King Victor Emmanuel III of Italy refused to grant the still-acting Prime Minister Luigi Facta's request to declare martial law, on the advice of his generals, who warned that the army might not obey orders to fire on the Fascists. Instead, the king invited Mussolini to come to Rome and discuss the political situation.
- Antrim Castle in Northern Ireland, the home of Parliamentary Secretary Algernon Skeffington, 12th Viscount Massereene, caught fire while guests were being entertained and was a total loss. All but one of the guests was able to escape but a maid died in the blaze. The ruins would remain standing for almost 50 years before their demolition in 1970.
- Born: Butch van Breda Kolff, American basketball player and coach, in Glen Ridge, New Jersey (d. 2007)

== October 29, 1922 (Sunday) ==
- Benito Mussolini departed Milan for Rome on an overnight train upon receiving word that he would be asked to form a new government. The "Era Fascista" retroactively counted October 29 as day 1 of Anno I in the official calendar introduced in 1926.
- Elections were held in Switzerland for the 198-member National Council. The Free Democratic Party of Federal Chancellor Adolf von Steiger won a plurality of seats with 60.
- The Greek Army completed its withdrawal from Eastern Thrace, conceding the territory as its loss to Turkey in the Greco-Turkish War.
- Born: Neal Hefti, U.S. jazz trumpeter, composer, songwriter and arranger; in Hastings, Nebraska (d. 2008)

== October 30, 1922 (Monday) ==
- Benito Mussolini arrived in Rome at 10:50 a.m., spoke with King Victor Emmanuel for an hour and then went to a hotel where he made a speech from the balcony, saying, "The Fascisti are completely victorious. I have come to Rome not only to give Italy a ministry but a true government. In a few hours you will have such a government. Long live King Victor Emmanuel! Long live victorious Italy! Long live the Fascisti!" By 3 p.m. the members of the coalition cabinet had been chosen, and at 7 p.m. Mussolini and his ministers were sworn in.
- The Frank Lloyd-directed film Oliver Twist, starring Jackie Coogan and Lon Chaney, was released.
- Died: Géza Gárdonyi, 59, Hungarian writer and journalist

== October 31, 1922 (Tuesday) ==
- Fascist leader Benito Mussolini took the oath of office as Prime Minister of Italy along with his cabinet, as he was sworn in by King Victor Emmanuel III following the resignation of Luigi Facta.
- Born:
  - Barbara Bel Geddes, American stage, film and television actress; in New York City (d. 2005)
  - César Portillo de la Luz, Cuban musical composer and lyricist known for the filin music genre; in Havana (d. 2013)
  - Norodom Sihanouk, King of Cambodia from 1941 to 1955, later the Chief of State (1960-1970) and figurehead president (1975-1976); in Phnom Penh (d. 2012)
