= Honolulu (disambiguation) =

Honolulu is the capital and the most populous community of the state of Hawaii in the United States.

Honolulu may also refer to:

== Ships ==
- SS City of Honolulu, several Los Angeles Steamship Company ships
- USS Honolulu, several United States Navy ships

== Other uses ==
- Honolulu (film), a 1939 musical film starring Eleanor Powell and Robert Young
- Honolulu (magazine), covering Honolulu and the Hawaii region
- Honolulu (pool), a pocket billiards game
- Honolulu County, Hawaii (officially the City and County of Honolulu), encompassing the entire island of Oahu
- "Honolulu", a song by Australian band Last Dinosaurs from the 2014 album In a Million Years
- "Honolulu", a song by German record producer Felix Jaehn, featuring Matluck, from the 2018 album I (Felix Jaehn album)
- A guide dog belonging to blind hiker Trevor Thomas
- Teniku Talesi Honolulu, former acting governor-general of Tuvalu.
