= Mary Ahern =

Mary Ahern may refer to:

- Mary Eileen Ahern (1860–1938), American librarian
- Mary V. Ahern (1922–2021), American radio and television producer
