= November 1922 =

Month of 1922

<<	November 1922					>>
Su	Mo	Tu	We	Th	Fr	Sa
			1	2	3	4
5	6	7	8	9	10	11
12	13	14	15	16	17	18
19	20	21	22	23	24	25
26	27	28	29	30

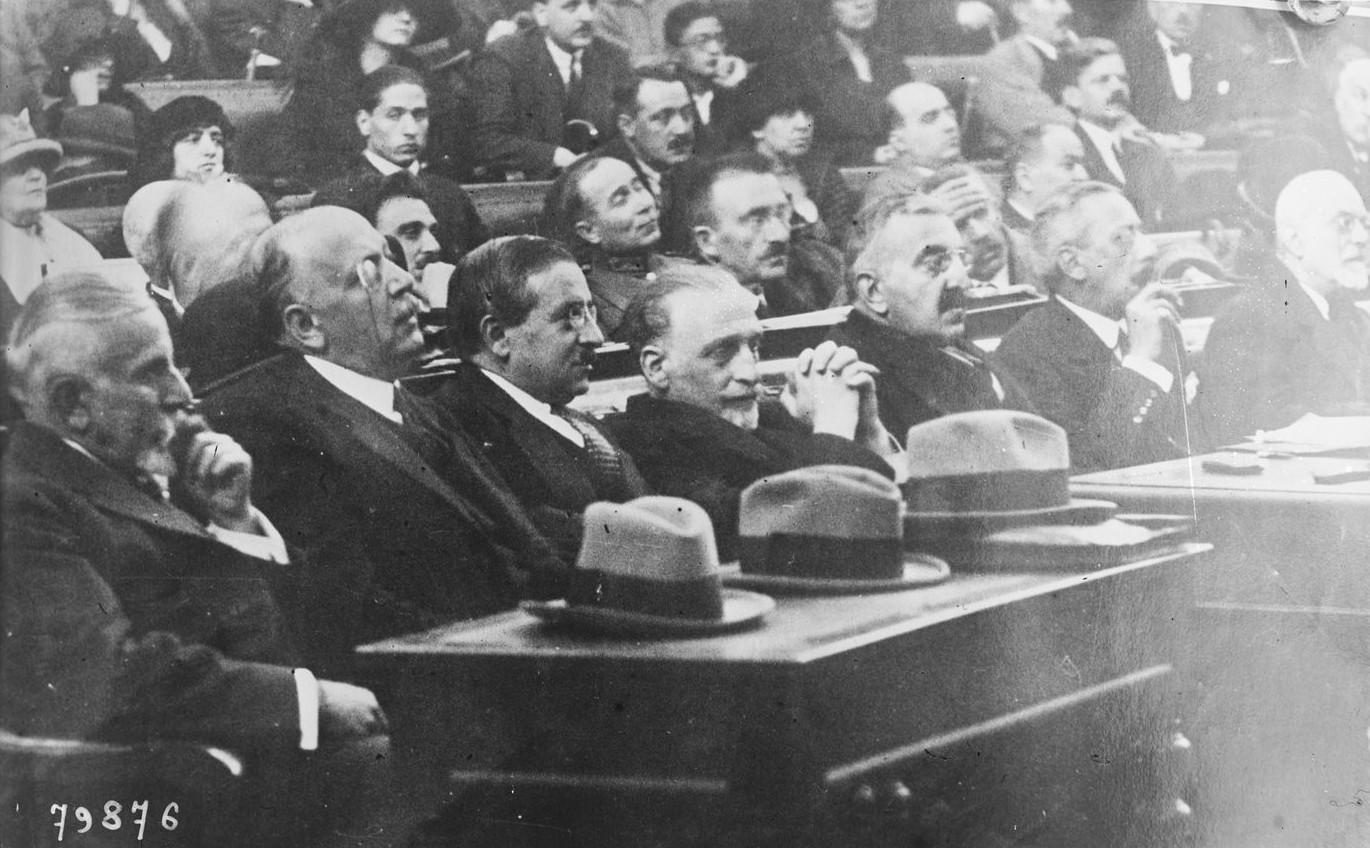
November 28, 1922: Death sentences carried out against five of six Greek leaders including (far right) former Prime Ministers Gounaris, Stratos, and Protopapadakis

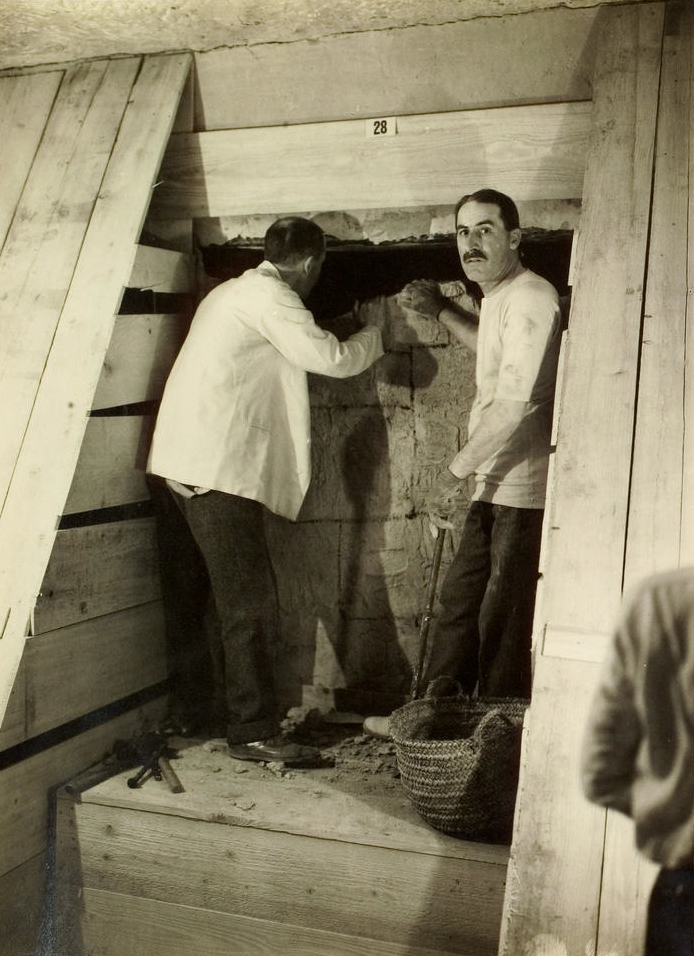
November 26, 1922: Howard Carter and Lord Carnarvon become the first persons in more than 3,000 years to enter the Tomb of Tutankhamen

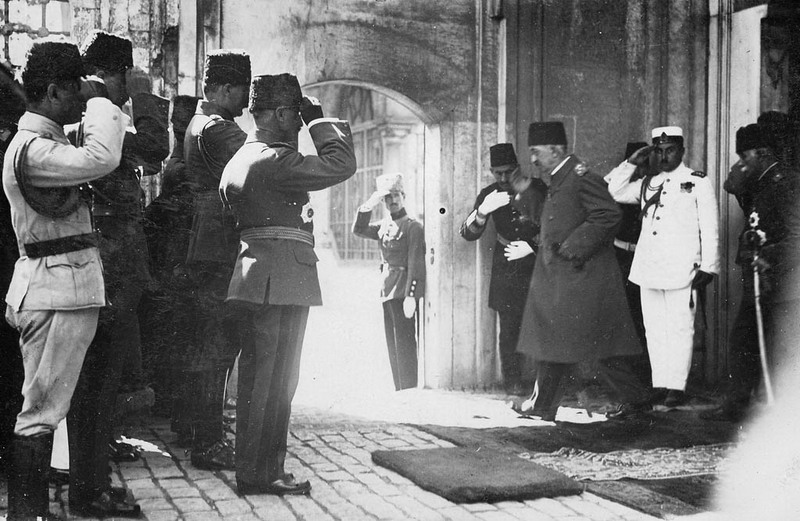
November 17, 1922: The Ottoman Empire comes to an end with the abdication and departure of the last Sultan, Mehmed VI

The following events occurred in November 1922:

== November 1, 1922 (Wednesday) ==
- In Ankara, the Grand National Assembly of Turkey voted to declare that the monarchy of the Ottoman Empire led by Sultan Mehmed VI, was abolished, and that since Constantinople was occupied, the city (now Istanbul) was no longer the capital of the Turkish people.
- Mickey Walker won the World Welterweight Title of boxing with a unanimous decision over Jack Britton at Madison Square Garden.
- Elections were held in Cuba for half of the 104 seats in the Chamber of Representatives.
- Died:
  - Lima Barreto, 41, Brazilian novelist and journalist
  - Francisco R. Murguía, 49, former Mexican Army General who attempted to overthrow Mexico's President Álvaro Obregón, was executed the day after his capture by federal troops. General Murguia was taken to the public square in Tepehuanes, where he had been captured, and shot by a firing squad.

== November 2, 1922 (Thursday) ==
- Regularly scheduled flying service began in Australia as the Queensland and Northern Territory Aerial Service (Qantas) pilot Hudson Fysh departed from the airfield at Longreach, Queensland in a Armstrong Whitworth F.K.8 biplane to transport passenger Alexander Kennedy on a flight to Cloncurry.
- Economic experts opened a conference in Berlin discussing the financial crisis in Germany.
- Died: Harry Hampton, 51, British Army war hero, was killed when he fell in front of an oncoming train at the Twickenham railway station.

== November 3, 1922 (Friday) ==
- The German mark fell to another record low of 6,156 to a U.S. dollar.
- Ratifications of the Concordat of 1922 were exchanged at the Vatican.
- The Walt Disney-directed animated short (9 minutes) film Puss in Boots was released as a Laugh-O-Gram cartoon.
- Born: Townsend Cromwell, U.S. oceanographer; in Boston, Massachusetts (d. 1958)
- Died: Jack Kennedy, 52, American train robber who had resumed his criminal career after 12 years incarceration, was shot and killed along with a partner, Harvey Logan, immediately after robbing a train near Wittenberg, Missouri.

== November 4, 1922 (Saturday) ==
- British archaeologist Howard Carter and his workmen discovered the entrance to the Tomb of Tutankhamun near Al-Uqsur (Luxor) in southern Egypt. Carter would later write that his team had cleared the remains of workmen's huts that had been "used probably by the labourers in the tomb of Rameses" on November 3 and that "Hardly had I arrived on the work next morning than the usual silence, due to the stoppage of the work, made me realize that something extraordinary had happened, and I was greeted with the announcement that a step cut in the rock had been discovered underneath the very first hut to be attacked. This seemed to be good to be true... we were actually in the entrance of a steep cut in the rock, some thirteen feet below the entrance to the tomb of Rameses VI..." Carter sent a telegram to the expedition's sponsor, Lord Carnarvon, that said "At last have made wonderful discovery in Valley; a magnificent tomb with seals intact; re-covered same for your arrival; congratulations."
- Ahmet Tevfik Pasha, the last Grand Vizier of the Ottoman Empire, resigned after the Grand National Assembly of Turkey abolished the post along with the sultanate.
- Former Turkish Interior Minister Ali Kemal was kidnapped from the barber shop of the luxurious Tokatlıyan Hotel in Istanbul on orders of General Nureddin Pasha, the military governor of Izmir.
- The Alabama Crimson Tide defeated the previously unbeaten Penn Quakers, 9 to 7, a major upset and one of the most important wins in Alabama (and Southern) college football history.
- Died: John William Gott, 56, British secularist and the last person to be convicted of blasphemy under British law, died less than three months after his release from prison.

== November 5, 1922 (Sunday) ==
- Former German Kaiser Wilhelm II married Hermine Reuss of Greiz at Doorn Castle in the Netherlands. Only 28 guests came to the private civil and religious ceremonies, including Doorn officials who were booed by the crowd.
- Parliamentary elections were held in Poland; the Christian Union of National Unity emerged as the largest bloc in the Sejm.
- The comedy and horror film The Headless Horseman of Sleepy Hollow, starring Will Rogers as Ichabod Crane, was premiered at the Symphony Theater in Los Angeles.
- The romantic drama film The Young Rajah starring Rudolph Valentino was released.
- Born:
  - Sydney Kentridge, South African lawyer; in Johannesburg (living in 2026)
  - Yitzchok Scheiner, American rabbi; in Pittsburgh (d. 2021)

== November 6, 1922 (Monday) ==
- A coal mine explosion killed 79 workers at the Reilly No. 1 Mine in Spangler, Pennsylvania.
- Born: Vivian Kellogg, American baseball player with 747 games in the AAGPBL, primarily for the Fort Wayne Daisies; in Jackson, Michigan (d. 2013)
- Died: Ali Kemal, 53, Turkish journalist and former Ottoman Minister of the Interior, kidnapped two days earlier, was lynched two days after while being transported to the gallows for execution. According to a reporter at the scene, "an angry mob of women pounced on him, attacking him with knives, stones, clubs, tearing at his clothing and slashing his body and head with cutlasses. After a few minutes of excruciating torture the victim expired."

== November 7, 1922 (Tuesday) ==
- The Democratic Party made big gains in both the U.S. House of Representatives and in the Senate in the United States midterm elections for Congress. While the Republican Party maintained its majority in both houses of Congress, their majority of more than 2 to 1 in the House fell from 302-131 to 225-207 as they lost 77 seats. The party's 60 to 36 lead in the Senate fell to only 53 to 42.
- Voters in the town of West Park, Ohio approved the end of the municipality's independent existence by a margin of almost 2-to-1 in a referendum, electing to be annexed by the city of Cleveland by a margin of 2,011 to 1,077. West Park's separate existence ended effective January 1, 1923.
- Born:
  - Desmond 'Dizzy' de Villiers, British test pilot; in Bedford, Bedfordshire (d. 1976)
  - Vincent Vaas (stage name for Andara Vaas Patabedige Vincent), Sri Lankan film actor; in Kalutara, Ceylon (d. 2004)
  - Ghulam Azam, Bangladeshi politician and leader of the Bangladesh Jamaat-e-Islami; in Dacca, Bengal Province, British India (d. 2014)
- Died: Sam Thompson, 62, American baseball right fielder for 20 seasons and inductee to the Baseball Hall of Fame

== November 8, 1922 (Wednesday) ==
- Economic experts of the Berlin conference submitted a detailed report to the German government advising that Germany declare a two-year moratorium on reparations payments to avoid economic collapse.
- Born: Christiaan Barnard, South African cardiac surgeon who performed the first successful heart transplant; in Beaufort West (d. 2001)
- Died: General Juan Carrasco, former Mexican Federal Army general who was leading a revolution to overthrow the government of President Álvaro Obregón, was killed in a battle with the Federales, along with seven of his men, near Guamuchil in Sinaloa state.

== November 9, 1922 (Thursday) ==
- The French Chamber of Deputies unanimously approved Prime Minister Raymond Poincaré's policy that France should not have to pay its war debts until it collected reparations due from Germany in turn.
- Scotland Yard police commissioner William Horwood became ill after being poisoned when he ate a box of Walnut Whip chocolates thinking they were a birthday gift from his daughter. London's newspaper, the Daily Mail would leak a key clue kept secret by police in order to prevent false leads, revealing on November 11 that arsenic in the box of chocolates was the cause of the poisoning. The crime was eventually traced to Walter Tatam, a mentally ill man.
- Born:
  - Raymond Devos, Belgian humorist; in Mouscron (d. 2006)
  - Dorothy Dandridge, American actress, singer and dancer, in Cleveland, Ohio (d. 1965)
- Died: Lieutenant General Viktor Pokrovsky, 33, one of the surviving leaders of the White Army during the Russian Civil War, was killed by police while in exile in the Bulgarian city of Kyustendil. Pokrovsky reportedly resisted arrest by local law enforcement conducting a murder investigation.

== November 10, 1922 (Friday) ==
- Irish Republican Army official Erskine Childers was captured by Irish Free State forces as part of the nationwide roundup of IRA members. Childers was tried, convicted, and executed by firing squad two weeks later.
- U.S. Treasury Secretary Andrew Mellon ordered the release of all 20 foreign vessels that had been seized at sea more than three miles from the coast of the United States, reversing a policy that had started on September 13 with the capture by the U.S. Coast Guard of the British schooner M. M. Gardner.
- As part of the peace settlement of the Turkish victory in the Greco-Turkish War, the formerly Greek city of Sarànta Ekklisiès (Greek for "40 Churches") was turned over to Turkey. Initially renamed "Kırk Kilise" (Turkish for "40 Churches) by the Turks, it received the designation of Kırklareli (Turkish for "The Place of 40") in 1924.

== November 11, 1922 (Saturday) ==
- An 8.5 magnitude earthquake struck Chile near the town of Vallenar at 04:32 UTC (12:32 a.m. local time), killing at least 1,000 people, 500 within the town, and was followed 15 minutes later by a tsunami that killed hundreds more at the coastal town of Caldera.
- The Oehmichen No.2, the first reliable flying helicopter capable of carrying a person, was given its first test flight by its inventor, French engineer Étienne Oehmichen, who built a machine using eight small vertically mounted rotors which rotated in the opposite direction from the large lifting rotors in order to maintain stability.
- The Unknown Soldier of Belgium was interred in a mausoleum at the base of the Congress Column in Brussels on the third anniversary of the end of World War I.
- In one of the biggest games of the 1922 college football season, the two unbeaten and untied teams of the Ivy League, both 6-0-0, faced off at Harvard Stadium in Boston. The Princeton Tigers defeated the Harvard Crimson, 10 to 3, marking their first victory over Harvard in 16 years. The Tigers finished at 8-0-0 the following week, having defeated Harvard, the University of Chicago, and Yale. Other unbeaten teams that would retroactively be declared contenders for the fictional national college football championship were Cornell University, Drake University (of Des Moines, Iowa), and the California Golden Bears.
- Baseball star Babe Ruth and Jacob Ruppert, owner of the New York Yankees signed and initialed an addendum to his existing contract in which Ruth pledged to be more careful in his personal life in return for a waiver of fines of $9,100 assessed against him by the club. Ruth initialed a statement that "I'll promise to go easier on drinking and to get to bed earlier, but not for you, fifty thousand dollars, or two-hundred and fifty thousand dollars will I give up women. They're too much fun."
- Born: Kurt Vonnegut, U.S. science fiction writer; in Indianapolis, Indiana (d. 2007)

== November 12, 1922 (Sunday) ==
- The first public demonstration of radiation therapy with x-rays as a means of killing cancer cells was staged at the Crocker Cancer Research Center at Columbia University. "The new X-ray apparatus, built by the General Electric Company," The New York Times wrote, "is so powerful that no one is admitted to the room with it while it is producing rays," and ran on 200,000 electrical volts of current. The Times noted that "this machine can be used with great effectiveness in killing cancer cells in the internal organs. But it will kill other cells, too, and until the technic of its use is developed, there is danger that it will kill the patient as well as the disease, so that for the present at least it will not be used on human beings."
- Regularly scheduled air service was inaugurated in Japan with a flight by a private carrier, Nippon Koku Yuso Kenkyujo (NKYK) or Japan Air Transport Institute (unrelated to the Japan Air Transport national airline founded in 1928) began flying passengers over Osaka Bay between the airfields of Sakai (in Osaka Prefecture) and Tokushima on Shikoku island.
- Sigma Gamma Rho sorority was founded at Butler University in Indianapolis, Indiana.

== November 13, 1922 (Monday) ==
- Benito Mussolini asked King Victor Emmanuel III for special powers enabling him to push through fiscal and civil service reforms without requiring full parliamentary approval. The king granted him these powers through December 31, 1923.
- The U.S. Supreme Court decided Ozawa v. United States, holding that the use of the word "white persons" in a statute was limited to persons whose ancestors were predominantly of Caucasian classification and of European origin. Takao Ozawa, a native of Japan, and his American lawyers argued that the term "white" was ambiguous enough to apply to a light-skinned Japanese person. The decision upheld a California law that barred Asian-born residents of the United States from becoming naturalized U.S. citizens.
- The F. W. Murnau-directed German Expressionist film Phantom premiered at the Ufa-Palast am Zoo in Berlin.

== November 14, 1922 (Tuesday) ==
- The British Broadcasting Corporation delivered the first radio news report in the United Kingdom, as Director of Programmes Arthur Burrows spoke from Marconi House, on London station 2LO, at six o'clock in the evening. According to the BBC, "The first bulletins included details of the opening of the Old Bailey sessions, a speech by the Conservative leader Bonar Law, the aftermath of a 'rowdy meeting' involving Winston Churchill, a train robbery, the sale of a Shakespearean first folio, fog in London — and 'the latest billiards scores'."
- Jānis Čakste was approved by Latvia's Parliament, the Saeima, to become the first President of Latvia by a vote of 92 to 6. Čakste had acted as Latvia's head of state since its independence in 1918. He was formally inaugurated on November 18.
- German Chancellor Joseph Wirth and his cabinet resigned when the Social Democratic Party refused to work with the German People's Party in a coalition ministry.
- Kyösti Kallio became Prime Minister of Finland.
- Born:
  - Boutros Boutros-Ghali, Egyptian politician and diplomat who was the Secretary-General of the United Nations from 1992 to 1996; in Cairo(d. 2016)
  - Veronica Lake (stage name for Constance Ockelman), American film actress; in Brooklyn, New York (d. 1973)
- Died: Godfrey Chevalier, 33, American naval aviator, died of injuries sustained two days earlier in an air crash.

== November 15, 1922 (Wednesday) ==
- The United Kingdom general election was held for the House of Commons. While the Conservatives of Prime Minister Bonar Law lost 35 seats and the Labour Party of Leader of the Opposition J. R. Clynes gained 85, the Conservatives retained a majority, with 344 of the 615 seats in Commons. Among the persons to lose election were long time MP Winston Churchill (who lost his Dundee seat to E. D. Morel), and science fiction author H. G. Wells, who had run for the London University constituency seat and lost to Dr. Sydney Russell-Wells.
- More than 300 protesters were shot and killed while participating in a general strike in the city of Guayaquil in Ecuador, after city police and the Ecuadorian Army fired into a crowd of about 20,000 demonstrators.
- One day after the London radio station 2LO inaugurated broadcasting on the BBC, the BBC stations 5IT (in Birmingham) and 2ZY (in Manchester) went on the air at 5:00 and 6:00 in the evening, respectively.
- 21 days after the capture of Vladivostok, the short-lived Far Eastern Republic was merged into the RSFSR.
- Artur Bernardes became President of Brazil.
- Born: David S. Feingold, American biochemist; in Chelsea, Massachusetts (d. 2019)

== November 16, 1922 (Thursday) ==
- Benito Mussolini made his first speech as Prime Minister to the Italian Chamber of Deputies, flaunting his power and intimidating his political opponents by saying, "I could have had a tremendous complete victory, but I did not want it. I have imposed on myself certain limitations ... I could have made this grey, toneless Chamber a bivouac for my troops. I could have barred up parliament and formed an exclusively Fascist government. I could have done; but at least for the moment, I did not wish to." He added, "I do not want, as long as it is possible for me, to rule against the wishes of Parliament; but Parliament must not forget the peculiar position it is in. I can dissolve Parliament the day after tomorrow just as easily as next year."
- Wilhelm Cuno accepted President Ebert's invitation to form the next German government.
- Elections for the Grand and General Council were held in the small nation of San Marino, with left-wing parties barred from participation and with a slate of Fascist and centre-right parties running all 60 candidates as the Patriotic Bloc. Voter turnout was only 35 percent, with less than 1,500 of 4,184 registered voters participating. The Sammarinese Fascist Party won control of the 60-member Consiglio Grande e Generale.
- Born:
  - José Saramago, Portuguese writer and 1998 Nobel Prize in Literature laureate, in Azinhaga (d. 2010)
  - Sidney Mintz, U.S. anthropologist; in Dover, New Jersey (d. 2015)
  - Hoàng Minh Chính, Vietnamese politician and dissident; in Nam Định (d. 2008)
  - Salvatore Giuliano, Italian Sicilian bandit; in Montelepre, Sicily (killed in gun battle, 1950)
- Died: Max Abraham, 47, German physicist who opposed the validity of Albert Einstein's Theory of Relativity, and whose theory of the structure of the electron was later discredited, died of a brain tumor.

== November 17, 1922 (Friday) ==
- The Irish Free State Army carried out its first executions under the Public Safety Bill, as four Irish Republican Army (IRA) members, arrested for carrying weapons in violation of the law, were court-martialed and then shot by a firing squad at the Portobello Barracks. The men, sentenced to death rather than a fine or imprisonment for "unauthorized possession of revolvers," were identified as James Fisher, Peter Cassidy, Richard Tuohy and John Gaffney. Irish Minister of Defence Richard Mulcahy said that he had approved the executions and, after a protest by opposition member that "I prophesy there will be the greatest revulsion of feeling against the government and the army," Mulchahy said to applause, "People have to be shot. It was necessary to shock the country into a realization of the grave thing it is to take human life. These men were found in the streets carrying loaded revolvers ready to take the lives of other men. That's the simple case we have to put before the country.". He added "And we may do it again tomorrow. It is time for us to strike. There seems to be no alternative." In response to the executions, the IRA's Chief of Staff would issue an order directing the shooting of any government or military official associated with the Public Safety Bill.
- The last Sultan of the Ottoman Empire, Mehmed VI, departed the Dolmabahçe Palace in Istanbul, boarded the British warship HMS Malaya and went into exile. He insisted he was not abdicating but was merely leaving Turkey for his safety.
- In Italy, Prime Minister Benito Mussolini and his government won a vote of confidence, 306 to 116.
- The Swedish Ice Hockey Association (Svenska Ishockeyförbundet or SIF), the governing body of all levels of ice hockey in Sweden, was founded.
- Born:
  - Stanley Cohen, U.S. biochemist and Nobel laureate; in Brooklyn, New York (d. 2020)
  - David S. Dodge, Lebanese-born American educator and president of the American University of Beirut who was kidnapped in 1982 and held hostage for a year; in Beirut (d. 2009)

== November 18, 1922 (Saturday) ==
- Republican U.S. Senator Truman H. Newberry, facing expulsion from Congress because of the irregularities in his election and an incoming Senate that was mostly unfavorable to him, resigned from office, effective immediately. Newberry's vacant seat would be filled 11 days later by the appointment of Detroit Mayor James J. Couzens, a Republican, by the Governor of Michigan.
- Former French Prime Minister Georges Clemenceau arrived in the United States for a lecture tour on foreign policy and maintaining peace. Upon his arrival in New York he immediately received a telegram from Woodrow Wilson that read, "Allow me to bid you welcome to America where you will find none but friends."
- The 60-member Supreme Council of Russian Monarchists concluded its five-day closed door session in Paris and elected Grand Duke Nicholas Nikolaevich, former Commander in Chief of the Imperial Russian Army during World War I, as the successor to Tsar Nicholas II in the event that Russia were to overthrow the Soviet government and restore the monarchy. Grand Duke Nicholas was a cousin of the Tsar Alexander III, the father of the last Tsar.
- The formerly Greek city of Makrá Géphura, located near Adrianople on the west side of the Bosporous Strait, was returned to Turkish control by the Allies after Adrianople was renamed as Edirne. Makrá Géphura reverted to its Turkish name of Uzunköprü. Both the Greek and Turkish language names referred to the "Long Bridge", at 4,567 feet (1,392 m) in length, the longest stone bridge in the world at the time.
- Died: Marcel Proust, 51, French novelist and critic known for Remembrance of Things Past (À la recherche du temps perdu), died of a pulmonary abscess and pneumonia.

== November 19, 1922 (Sunday) ==
- Abdulmejid II, formerly the Crown Prince of the Ottoman Empire, was elected by the Grand National Assembly of Turkey at Ankara as the new Caliph of the Muslim people, receiving 148 of the 168 votes cast. Abdulmejid would serve for only two years before the abolition of the office in 1924.
- The Kingdom of Bulgaria held a referendum on whether to amend existing law in order to prosecute former Bulgarian officials for war crimes. Voters approved the resolution by a margin of nearly 3-to-1.
- Unemployed hunger marchers demonstrated in Trafalgar Square in London.
- In the last matchup of the 1922 season between the two National Football League teams that remained unbeaten, the Canton Bulldogs (5-0-2) were hosted by the Chicago Cardinals (6-0-0) at Comiskey Park and won, 7 to 0, on a 35-yard pass from Lou Smyth to Norb Sacksteder. The Bulldogs' 20 to 3 win on the rematch a week later in Canton took the two game series, and the two wins proved to be the difference between Canton's first place finish (10-0-2) and the Cardinals third place position at season's end. (8-3-0).
- More than 90 persons on the Mexican passenger ship Topolobampo died when the vessel capsized in the Gulf of California off of the coast of the state of Baja California. Only 34 of the 125 people on board were rescued.
- Born: Yuri Knorozov, Ukrainian linguist and epigrapher who deciphered the hieroglyphic writing system used by the Maya civilization in Mexico; in Kharkiv, Ukrainian SSR (d. 1999)
- Died: Frank Bacon, 58, American stage actor and playwright.

== November 20, 1922 (Monday) ==
- Abdul-Muhsin Al-Saadoun became the second Prime Minister of Iraq, after Abd Al-Rahman Al-Gillani resigned in protest of the installation of former Syrian King Faisal I bin Al-Hussein bin Ali Al-Hashemi as the King of Iraq.
- Lithuania's government ministers, led by Prime Minister Ernestas Galvanauskas, met secretly and voted to forment what became the Klaipėda Revolt of 1923, an attempt to get the Lithuanian people in the former Prussian Memel Territory to rise up against League of Nations administrators and to annex Memel as the Klaipeda Region.
- Frederick W. B. Coleman of the United States became the first U.S. diplomatic envoy to the Republic of Estonia, presenting his credentials at Tallinn to the State Elder Konstantin Päts. Coleman, the diplomatic minister to all three Baltic states, had opened the diplomatic mission to Latvia in Riga on November 13 and traveled the following week to inaugurate the mission to Lithuania at Vilnius.
- Born: D. G. M. Wood-Gush, South African-born British ethologist and pioneer in "free range" raising of animals; in Umtata (d. 1992)
- Died: Maria Fortunata Viti, 95, Italian Benedictine nun

== November 21, 1922 (Tuesday) ==
- The Conference of Lausanne opened in Switzerland, under the chairmanship of Lord Curzon, in order to form the terms for a peace treaty in Asia Minor to determine the border between Turkey and Greece. The Treaty of Lausanne would be signed on July 24, 1923. On the first day, Benito Mussolini angered Curzon and France's Raymond Poincaré by saying that Italy would support the Turkish demand that Russia participate fully in the conference.
- Future Republic of Ireland Prime Minister Éamon de Valera narrowly escaped arrest by the Irish Free State Army, and possible execution, when soldiers raided the wrong house because of an incorrect number in the address. De Valera had been at the Dublin house of Count Plunkett, but a half-hour passed before the mistake in the house number was discovered.
- The first legislative elections in British Burma (now Myanmar) took place for 80 of the 103 seats in the Legislative Council of Burma, with 21 other seats to be appointed by the British governor.
- Eighty-seven-year-old Rebecca Latimer Felton of Georgia became the first woman to ever serve in the U.S. Senate, although she only served for 24 hours and the appointment was largely symbolic. Felton had enough time to make a speech to her fellow senators, saying, "When the women of the country come in and sit with you, though there may be but a very few in the next few years, I pledge to you that you will get ability, you will get integrity of purpose, you will get patriotism, and you will get unstinted usefulness."
- Britain's Labour Party elected Ramsay MacDonald as its new leader.
- The New York Times published its very first article about Adolf Hitler. The article explained Hitler's appeal to Germans, including his vicious anti-Semitism, but reported that "several reliable, well-informed sources confirmed the idea that Hitler's anti-Semitism was not so genuine or violent as it sounded, and that he was merely using anti-Semitic propaganda as bait to catch masses of followers."

== November 22, 1922 (Wednesday) ==
- A mine explosion in Dolomite, Alabama killed 90 people.
- Wilhelm Cuno, an independent politician who was not a member of any political party, was appointed as the new Chancellor of Germany by President Friedrich Ebert without a vote in the Reichstag.
- U.S. President Warren G. Harding defied racist opponents and nominated Walter L. Cohen, an African-American Republican, to the office of Controller of Customs of the Port of New Orleans.
- Walter F. George began a 34-year career as U.S. Senator for Georgia, after having waited one day to be sworn in for the purpose of letting Rebecca Latimer Felton serve one day as the first woman in the U.S. Senate.
- Born:
  - Wanis al-Qaddafi, the last Prime Minister of the Kingdom of Libya until his overthrow on August 31, 1969, by Colonel Muammar al-Qaddafi, no relation; in Benghazi, Italian Cyrenaica (d. 1986)
  - Eugene Stoner, American firearms designer who was the primary creator of the M16 rifle; in Gosport, Indiana (d. 1997)
  - Ed Daly, U.S. airline entrepreneur and philanthropist known for his ownership of World Airways; in Chicago (d. 1984)
  - Aksel Jacobsen Bogdanoff, Norwegian communist (d. 1971)

== November 23, 1922 (Thursday) ==
- President Harding nominated Pierce Butler to the U.S. Supreme Court to replace William R. Day. Original speculation by the U.S. press was that Harding, a Republican, would select a Democrat judge, William I. Grubb, to succeed Day. Butler, who was also a Democrat, would be confirmed by the U.S. Senate by a vote of 61 to 8.
- Born: Võ Văn Kiệt, Vietnamese politician and statesman; in Cochinchina (d. 2008)
- Died: Eduard Seler, 72, German anthropologist

== November 24, 1922 (Friday) ==
- Abdulmejid II was installed in Constantinople as the Islamic Caliph in a simple ceremony after having been elected by Islamic elders on November 19. The Ottoman Caliphate, nominally the supreme religious and political leadership of all Muslims across the world, would be abolished by Grand National Assembly of Turkey on March 3, 1924.
- The Colorado River Compact was signed by the Governors of seven U.S. states at a conference in Santa Fe, New Mexico, to regulate the use of the Colorado River, with the Upper Basin states (Colorado, New Mexico, Utah and Wyoming) pledging to not cause the flow of the river not to be depleted below a specified level during any period of ten consecutive years in order to insure an adequate supply to the states down river (Arizona, California and Nevada), and allotting the division of the river's waters in the upper basin (with a majority reserved for Colorado) and in the lower basin (majority allotted to California). The interstate compact came in the wake of the U.S. Supreme Court decision in the case of Wyoming v. Colorado, decided on June 5, 1922, and cleared the way for the construction of the Hoover Dam.
- Died:
  - Erskine Childers, 52, Irish nationalist author, was executed by a firing squad at 7:00 in the morning at the Beggars Bush Barracks at Dublin after being convicted by a Free State Army court of unlawful possession of a firearm.
  - Sidney Constantino Sonnino, 75, Prime Minister of Italy in 1906, and from 1909 to 1910.

== November 25, 1922 (Saturday) ==
- The bill giving Benito Mussolini's government dictatorial power for a year was passed, 275 to 90. The Italian Chamber of Deputies approved granting full power to Mussolini and the cabinet of ministers in financial matters, to expire on December 31, 1923.
- Born: Shelagh Fraser, English actress; in Purley, London (d. 2000)

== November 26, 1922 (Sunday) ==
- The Howard Carter expedition in Luxor entered the tomb of Tutankhamun. Carter, Lord Carnarvon, and Carnarvon's 21-year-old daughter Lady Evelyn Herbert became the first persons in more than 3,000 years to set foot inside the tomb.
- The first popular election for President of Uruguay was held, as voters cast their preferences for the president and for the 123-member Cámara de Representantes, the lower house of the Asamblea General. José Serrato of the Colorado Party won 123,279 votes overall compared to 116,080 for Luis Alberto de Herrera of the National Party, for a four-year term to start on March 1.
- The Toll of the Sea, the second Technicolor film, premiered at the Rialto Theatre in New York City. The silent 53-minute color film starred Anna May Wong
- Dr. Jack, a silent comedy starring Harold Lloyd and one of the 10 most popular films of 1922, was released. It would gross more than $1.25 million in sales at a time when tickets were priced at 10 cents in the United States.
- What would prove to be the deciding game for the championship in the National Football League in the U.S. took place as the Canton Bulldogs defeated the Chicago Cardinals at home for the second game of a two game series. On November 19, the Cardinals (6-0-0) and the Bulldogs (5-0-2) were the last unbeaten teams when they met at Comiskey Park, and Canton won, 7 to 0. In the scheduled rematch a week later, 6-0-2 Canton hosted the 6-1-0 Cardinals and won, 20 to 3. There were no playoffs, and Canton would win the title after finishing the season on December 10 in first place holding a 10-0-2 record, with the Chicago Bears second and the Chicago Cardinals third.
- In Turkey, the United Kingdom returned control of the Gallipoli peninsula, site of World War One's Gallipoli Campaign, to Turkish control.
- Born: Charles M. Schulz, American cartoonist and creator of the comic strip Peanuts; in Minneapolis, Minnesota (d. 2000)

== November 27, 1922 (Monday) ==
- Greek Army Lieutenant General Stylianos Gonatas became the new Prime Minister of Greece upon the resignation of Sotirios Krokidas in the wake of the death sentences pronounced on six of the nine defendants in the trial of former Greek leaders.
- Born: Nicholas Magallanes, American dancer and principal dancer for the New York City Ballet (d. 1977)
- Died: Demetrio Castillo Duany, 66, Cuban revolutionary, soldier and politician

== November 28, 1922 (Tuesday) ==
- In Greece, all former cabinet officers and army officials convicted of high treason in the Trial of the Six were executed. The British government broke with Greece over the executions. Three former Prime Ministers -- Dimitrios Gounaris, 55; Petros Protopapadakis, 68; Nikolaos Stratos, 50—were shot by a firing squad, along with General Georgios Hatzianestis, 58, for their roles in losing the Greco-Turkish War.
- Two 23-year-old graduates of Yale University, Henry Luce and Briton Hadden, incorporated Time Inc. for the purpose of publishing a weekly news magazine to be sold across the United States, and commenced fund raising. On March 3, 1923, the first issue of Time magazine was published, followed by the founding of Fortune (1930), Life (1936) and Sports Illustrated (1954). Time, Inc., would merge with Warner Communications in 1990.
- Skywriting was first done in the United States, over New York City, after having been launched on May 31 in England. In New York, Royal Air Force pilot Cyril Turner (flying at an altitude of 10,000 feet (3,000 m)) wrote "Hello USA" followed by "Call Vanderbilt 7200" (the telephone number for the Vanderbilt Hotel, which received 47,000 phone calls in the next three hours).
- Lake of the Woods County, Minnesota, was created in the United States, after voters in Beltrami County approved the separation of the northern townships (including the "Northwest Angle", the only portion of the contiguous 48 U.S. states to be north of the 49th parallel. With a county seat of Baudette, the new political unit is one of the last new counties to be created in the U.S.
- The musical stage comedy The Bunch and Judy, starring Fred Astaire opened at the Globe Theatre on Broadway.

== November 29, 1922 (Wednesday) ==
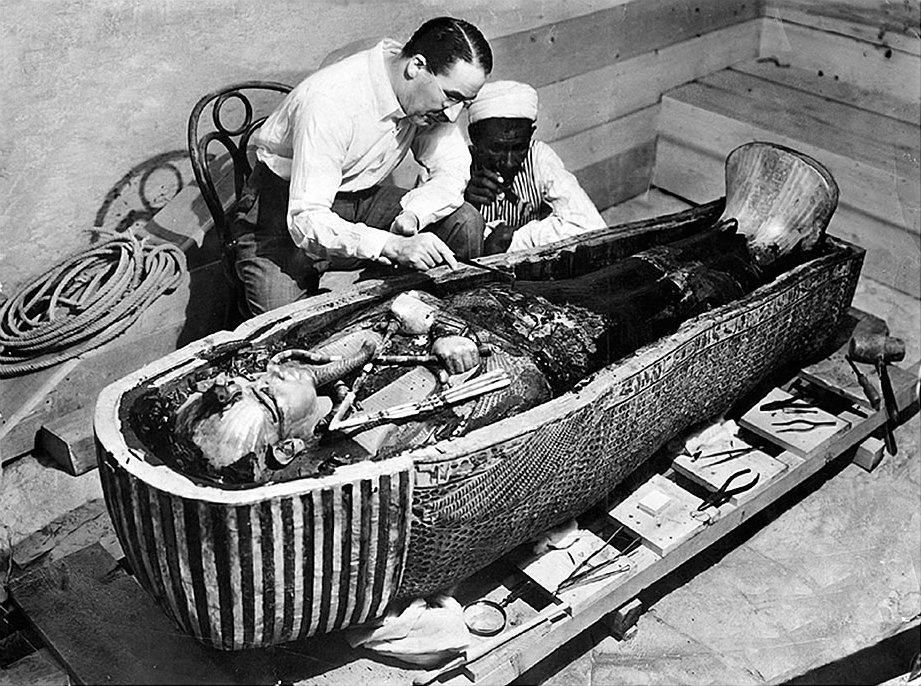
Carter and Tutankhamun

- Archaeologist Howard Carter opened the sarcophagus containing the body of Tutankhamun, the Pharaoh of Egypt who died around 1323 BC.
- Sultan Idris Education University was founded as a teacher's college in Malaysia in the city of Tanjung Malim.
- In the U.S., Illinois Governor Len Small commuted the prison sentences of "wealthy radical" William Bross Lloyd and 16 of his associates in the Communist Labor Party of America who had been convicted under the state's anti-syndicate law. Governor Small said in a statement, "These men are not criminals. Since their indictmen and conviction in March, 1921, they have suffered severely. No great good can come from longer incarceration of them. The men were freed from the state penitentiary in Joliet at 10:40 that night.
- Walter Berndt's comic strip Smitty first appeared. The strip would run for more than 50 years, until 1974.
- Born: Orestes "Minnie" Miñoso, Cuban-born U.S. baseball player and Baseball Hall of Fame inductee; in Perico (d. 2015)
- Died: Renzo Novatore, Italian anarchist and philosopher, was shot and killed in an ambush by Italian police in the city of Teglia, near Genoa.

== November 30, 1922 (Thursday) ==
- Liam Lynch, the Chief of Staff of the Irish Republican Army, issued the "orders of frightfulness", general orders to IRA members authorizing the assassination of officials of the Irish Free State government as a retaliation for the Free State's execution (under what he referred to as the "Murder Bill") of captured IRA members. Seán Hales, a Teachta Dála (member of Dáil Éireann, the lower house of the Irish parliament) became the first person killed under Lynch's order, seven days later. Lynch's order, titled "Enemy Murder Bill", declared that "All members of the Provisional 'Parliament' who were present and voted for the Murder Bill will be shot at sight. Houses of members... who are known to support Murder Bill will be destroyed. Free State army officers who approve of Murder Bill will be shot at sight; also all ex-British army officers and men who joined the Free State army since 6 December 1921." Lynch's order would last for five months until his shooting by Free State troops on April 10, 1923.
- The British Ministry of Defence announced that it would withdraw all of its remaining troops from the Irish Free State beginning on December 12 and finishing by January 5, 1923.
- Abdel Khalek Sarwat Pasha resigned as Prime Minister of Egypt and was succeeded by Mohamed Tawfik Naseem Pasha.
- The United Kingdom closed its network of post offices in China that had been in place for more than 50 years. The offices, located in Amoy (Xiamen), Canton (Guangzhou), Chefoo (Yantai), Foochow (Fuzhou), Hankow (Hankou), Kiungchow (Qiongzhou), Ningpo (Ningbo), Shanghai, Swatow (Shantou), and Tientsin (Tianjin) had the authority to issue their own postage stamps and shipped mail to Hong Kong for forwarding.
- At least 17 people were killed in battles between police and protesters in Mexico City as an angry mob tried to storm city hall and started a fire in anger over water rationing.
- Hsuan Tung, the 17-year old former Emperor of China, married 16-year old Gobulo Wanrong in an elaborate ceremony in the Forbidden City section of Beijing, held by the government despite the abolition of the monarchy.
- A crowd of 50,000 heard Adolf Hitler speak at a Nazi Party rally in Munich.
- Born: John Raymond Smythies, British neuroscientist, in Nainital, United Provinces, British India (d. 2019)
- Died:
  - James R. Mann, 66, U.S. Representative for Illinois since 1897, best known for authorship of the White-Slave Traffic Act of 1910, better-known as the "Mann Act", making the transportation of a woman across state lines for immoral purposes punishable as a federal crime.
  - René Cresté, 40, French actor and director, died of tuberculosis
  - Samuel Marx, 55, American politician who had won the November 7 election to represent the 19th Congressional District for New York, died of heart failure 23 days after his victory.
  - George Auger, 40, Welsh-born performer with the Barnum and Bailey Circus who was billed as "The Cardiff Giant" and claimed to be 8 feet, 4 inches tall, died of indigestion at the home of friends in New York City. Auger, who probably stood no taller than 7'5", died just before he was to become a movie actor as a key figure in Harold Lloyd's comedy Why Worry?.
