= Poodle skirt =

Type of skirt

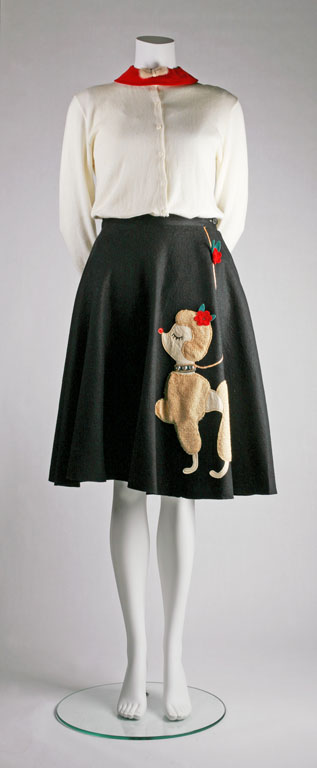
A 1950s poodle skirt

A poodle skirt is a wide swing felt skirt of a solid color displaying a design appliquéd or transferred to the fabric. The design was often a coiffed poodle. Later substitutes for the poodle patch included flamingoes, flowers, and hot rod cars. They quickly became very popular with teenage girls in 1950s, who wore them at school dances, and as everyday wear.

== Creation ==
The skirt originated in 1947 in the United States, designed by Juli Lynne Charlot. The idea for the skirt began as Charlot needed a last-minute Christmas skirt. With little money and little ability to sew, she made the seamless skirt herself out of felt. As Charlot's design for a skirt caught on, she was asked to make a dog-themed skirt, as dogs were popular. She initially designed the skirt with three dachshunds, which would all have three personalities. The first dog would be a flirty girl, the second dog would be a snobby girl, and the third dog would be a male attracted to the flirty girl dog. However, due to the leashes being tangled, the male dog would be stuck next to the snobby girl dog. Charlot wanted her designs to tell a story and be "conversation starters", so much that she made sure clothing store salespeople knew the stories printed on the skirt, just in case a customer would ask.

== Manufacturing ==
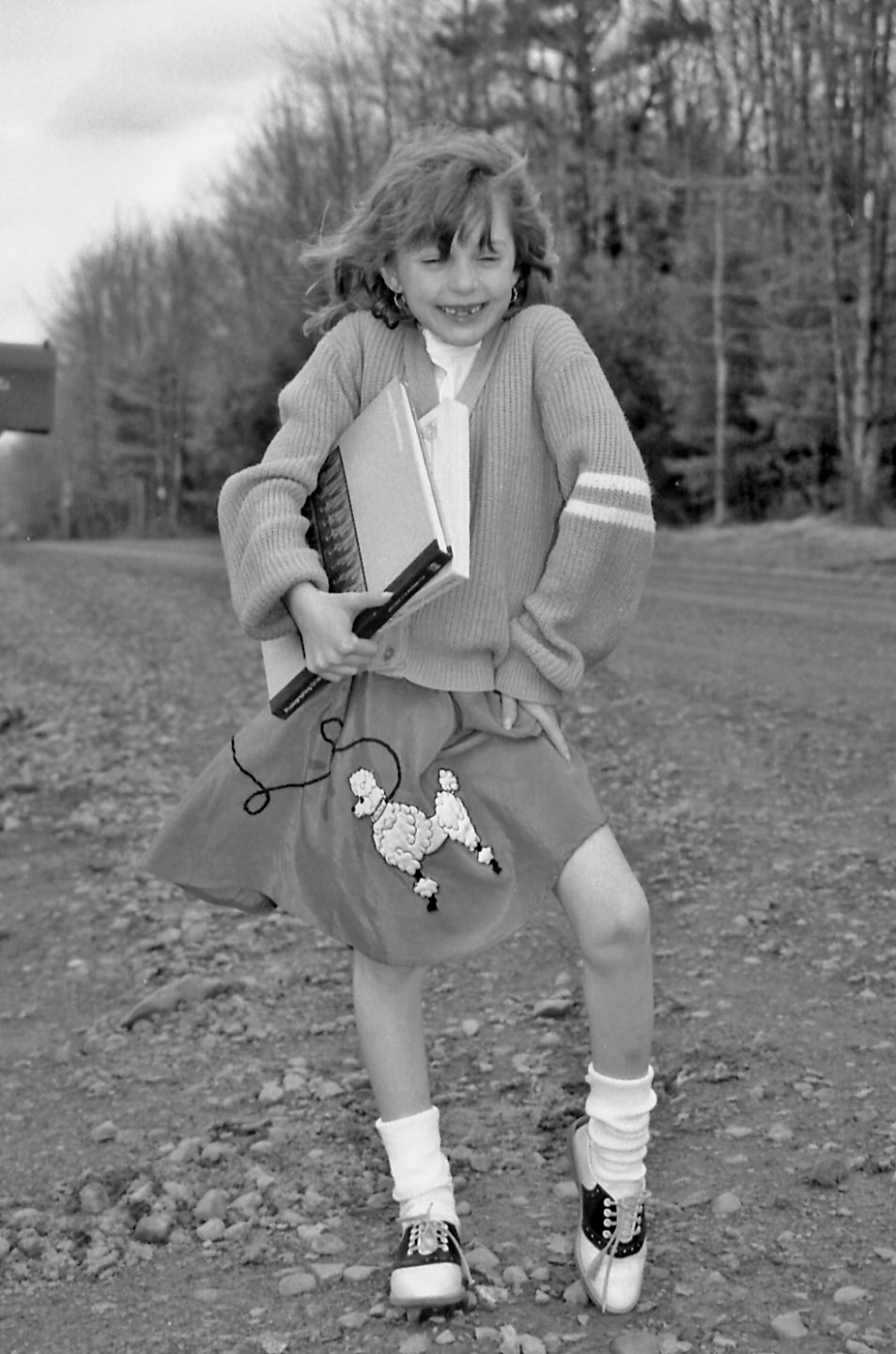
Girl wearing saddle shoes and a poodle skirt

The skirt was easy for people to make at home, since the design was simple and the materials easily available. The original homemade skirt could be made by cutting a circle out of felt for the waist. Then, appliqués could be added on to reflect the person's interests and hobbies.

In just a week after the debut of the poodle skirt, Charlot was able to sell the design. As the popularity of her skirt began to grow, she eventually opened her own factory.

== Popularity ==
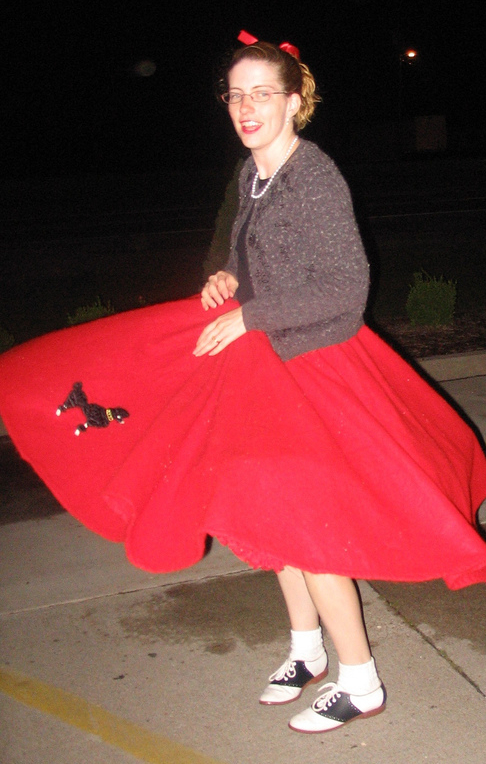
When spinning, the skirt would flare out.

Movie stars commonly wore this type of skirt, and it featured widely in magazines and advertising. Many consumers were eager to keep up with Hollywood's fashions, adding to the skirt's popularity.

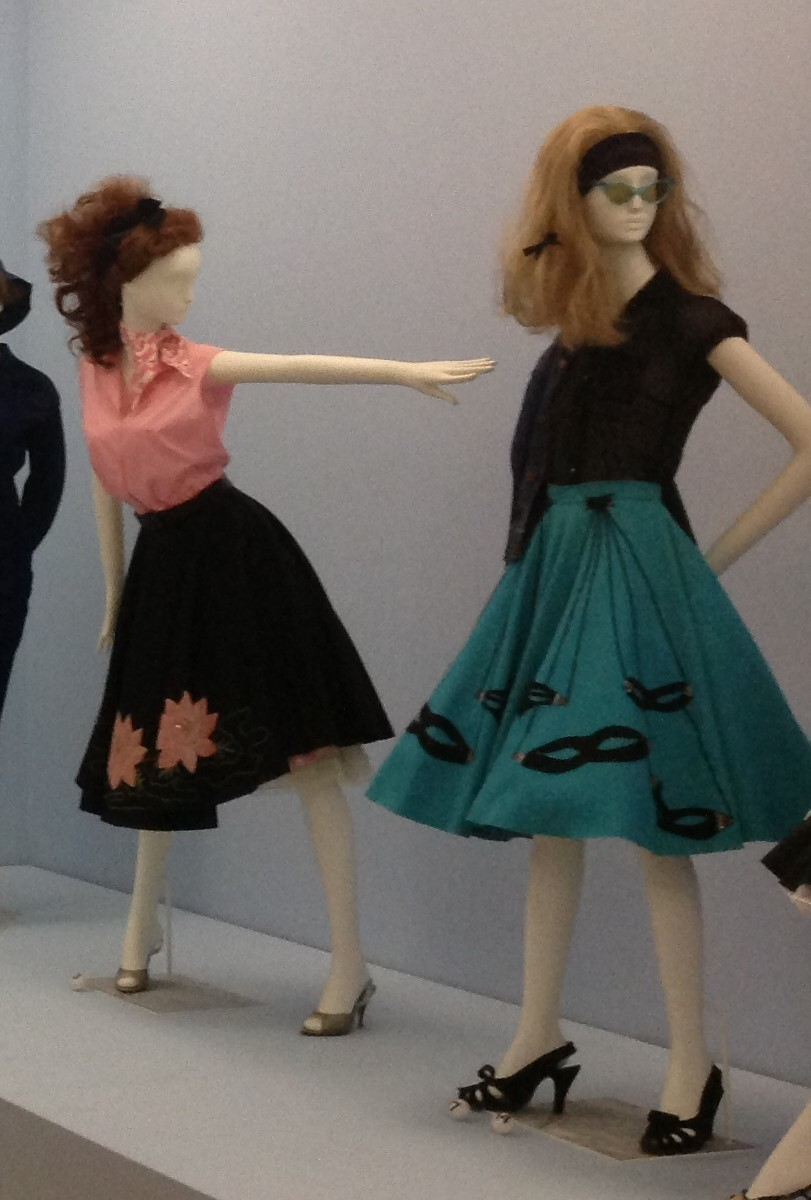
The decorations could be chosen to reflect the wearer's interests.

The skirt proved most popular with teenage girls, and in 1952 mail-order catalogs dedicated to poodle skirts were made. Known as the "first teenage fashion trend", these skirts were perfect for dancing. It could also be said that the skirt's ability to be customized led to its success with teenagers, as it reflected individual personalities.

== Modern poodle skirts ==
The poodle skirt remains one of the most memorable symbols of the 1950s in the United States and is frequently worn as a novelty retro item, part of a nostalgic outfit. A similar design of these skirts became popular in the years 2009–2010. The skirts had been shortened but the newer designs retained the original waistband. New poodle skirts are made out of modern felt and are simply reproductions of the originals.

== See also ==
- Bobby sock
- Cardigan (sweater)
- Saddle shoe
- Sock hop
