= Bobby sock =

Women's ankle-length socks

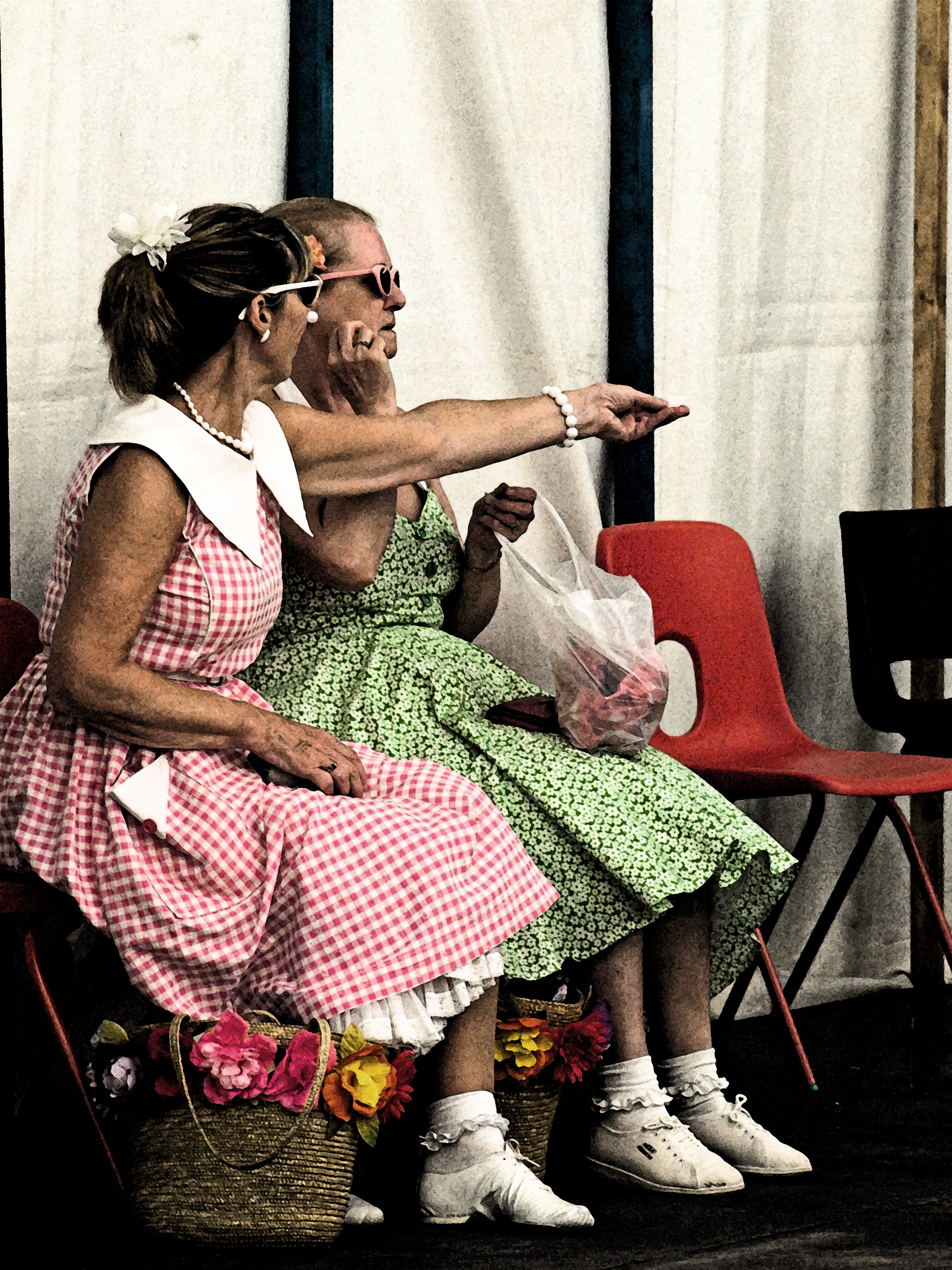
Two modern women cosplaying 1940s fashion, wearing one type of bobby socks (27 June 2010)

Bobby socks are a style of women's socks. They are usually white and worn ankle-length or collected at the ankle, instead of being rolled up fully extended on the leg. The term is derived from the socks being worn "bobbed", meaning around the ankle.

The popularity of bobby socks among young American women in the 1940s led to this demographic being popularly referred to as "bobby soxers".

They were initially popular in the United States in the 1940s and 1950s, and they later made a comeback in the 1980s.
