= Trevor Thomas (hiker) =

American blind hiker (born 1968/69)

Trevor Thomas (born 1968 or 1969) is an American blind hiker. As of 2022 he has hiked over 22,000 miles (35,000 km) solo. He was the first blind person to complete the Appalachian Trail on an unassisted solo hike, in 2008. He hikes with a guide dog, and uses sophisticated digital technology, emailing his route to his phone to convert to audible sections, using echo location to identify obstacles, and having a satellite beacon which updates his Facebook page with his location every 10 minutes; if he is in the wrong place or not making the expected progress, his expedition coordinator is alerted. He supports himself through speaking, writing, blogging, and sponsorship, and has set up the Team FarSight Foundation to support young blind people in outdoor activities.

Thomas has hiked the Pacific Crest Trail, the Tahoe Rim Trail, the John Muir Trail, Long Trail, the Colorado Trail, and the North Carolina's Mountain to Sea Trail. He has climbed to the summits of Mount Mitchell, Mount Rose, Mount Whitney, Mount Elbert, and Mount Friel.

Thomas lost his sight at age 36.

== Guide dogs ==
Thomas's first guide dog was Tennille, who was born 27 November 2010 and accompanied him from 2012 until she retired in 2018. Together they walked over 10,000 miles (16,000 km) and climbed five 14,000-foot (4,300 m) summits. In 2016 she was said to be "currently the only dual mode dog capable of performing backcountry guide work in addition to her standard guiding duties".

Thomas' new dog is Honolulu or Lulu. They met in October 2018. As of March 2019, Thomas was training Lulu for her new role.
