= Juli Lynne Charlot =

American fashion designer and entertainer (1922–2024)

- Charlot in 1947, wearing a circle skirt
- Born: Shirley Ann Agin; October 26, 1922; New York City, U.S.
- Died: March 3, 2024 (aged 101); Tepoztlán, Morelos, Mexico
- Occupations: Fashion designer; singer; actress
- Years active: 1947–2013
- Known for: Circle skirt, poodle skirt
- Label: Juli Lynne Charlot
- Spouse: Philip Charlot
- Website: julilynnecharlot.com

Juli Lynne Charlot (born Shirley Ann Agin; October 26, 1922 – March 3, 2024) was an American singer, actress, and fashion designer. She first became a singer, appearing in several films, and also performed alongside the Marx Brothers. She created the poodle skirt in 1947, and made circle skirts during her career as a fashion designer. Later on, she made variations of Mexican dress while in Mexico, which led to her purchase of a manufacturing plant in Mexico City to produce and sell the variations.

== Early life and career ==
Born Shirley Ann Agin on October 26, 1922, in Manhattan, New York City to a Jewish family. Charlot began taking voice lessons at the age of 13. After graduating from Hollywood High School, she performed with the Los Angeles Civic Light Opera as a singer and also sang with an orchestra directed by Xavier Cugat. Charlot appeared on stage at the Ziegfeld Theatre in The Red Mill in 1945 and also appeared in several films, including Night in Paradise in 1946 in which she was cast as a singer. She later performed with the Marx Brothers, who asked her to tour with them at several military bases during World War II. Charlot also began travelling worldwide in the company of some of the greatest names in show business at the time.

=== Fashion designer ===
In 1947, at age 25, Charlot was invited to a Christmas party in Los Angeles and planned to create a dress for the event. Having little money, though, she decided to make her own skirt to wear, instead. Charlot stated in February 1953 "If I had known how to sew, or had the money to purchase better materials, I would have never made the circle skirt." Additionally, Charlot's mother owned a factory which used felt, which allowed her to use that material.

A week later, Charlot made two more circle skirts, taking them to a Beverly Hills, California boutique just prior to Christmas 1947. They were sold immediately; this started the Juli Lynne Charlot California company. A New York City dress manufacturer soon decided to invest some money in the factory.

After Christmas 1947, a Los Angeles boutique requested a non-holiday motif. Charlot designed a skirt with the idea stemming from Dachshunds. The skirts at the boutique in Beverly Hills were quite popular and sold out; in early 1948, Charlot designed a similar skirt with poodles, which was more successful than the previous skirts based on dachshunds. The president of Bullocks Wilshire ordered the poodle skirts, which were then displayed in windows along Wilshire Boulevard. The skirts were also ordered from Neiman Marcus in Dallas and Bergdorf Goodman in New York City. Charlot's designs were so successful that one of them appeared in a national ad campaign for Maidenform bras in 1952.

While in Mexico in the 1980s, Charlot took interest in a classic Mexican wedding dress and decided to create variations on it. This resulted in her purchase of a manufacturing plant in Mexico City to produce and export these dresses worldwide. The factory later collapsed during the 1985 Mexico City earthquake, forcing her to abandon the dress business.

In November 2008, Charlot had a one-woman show entitled "In Retrospect" in Cuernavaca. In early 2009, the Izcalli Boutique in Cuernavaca presented an offering of some of the original designs that were still in Charlot's possession. The trunk show was a huge success and was accompanied by a Juli Lynne Calendar full of photos from her career.

== Personal life and death ==
Juli Lynne was married four times, including her second marriage to film editor Philip Charlot. Charlot retired in Mexico, and purchased a home in Tepoztlán.

Charlot died at her home in Tepoztlán on March 3, 2024, at age 101.
