= SS City of Honolulu =

SS City of Honolulu may refer to one of these Los Angeles Steamship Company ships:

- SS City of Honolulu (1896), under this name from May 1922 until her sinking on 17 October 1922; as SS Friedrich der Grosse for North German Lloyd from launch, 1896–1914; as USS Friedrich der Grosse, 1917, and USS Huron (ID-1408), 1917–1919, for U.S. Navy; SS Huron in passenger service, 1919–1922
- SS City of Honolulu (1900), under this name from 1926 to scrapping; as SS Kiautschou for Hamburg-America Line from launch, 1900–1904; as SS Princess Alice for North German Lloyd, 1904–1917; as USS Princess Matoika for U.S. Navy, 1917–1919; as USAT Princess Matoika for U.S. Army, 1919–1921; as SS Princess Matoika in passenger service, 1921–1922; as SS President Arthur for United States Lines, 1922–1925, and for American Palestine Line, 1925
