= Saddle shoe =

Casual footwear with saddle-shaped decorative panel

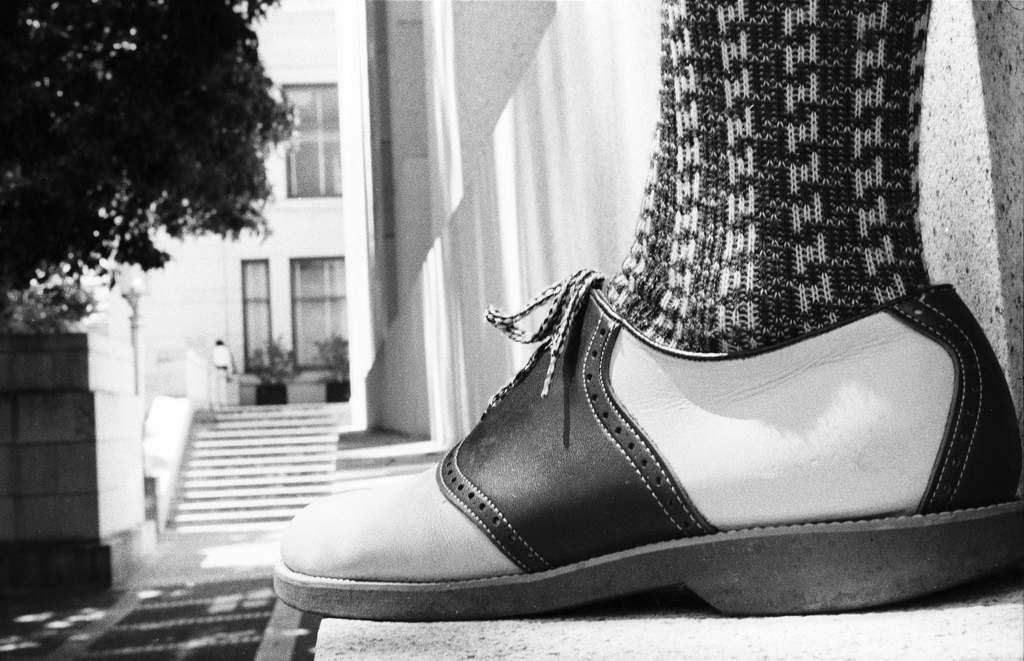
A saddle shoe

The saddle shoe, also known as "saddle oxford", is a low-heeled casual shoe, characterized by a plain toe and saddle-shaped decorative panel placed mid foot. Saddle shoes are typically constructed of leather and are most frequently white with a black, dark brown, or dark blue saddle, although any color combination is possible.

Saddle shoes were worn by both men and women in a variety of styles ranging from golf cleats to school uniform shoes. They had a reputation as the typical shoes of school-girls, especially in the 1940s and 1950s.

== In popular culture ==
- In Family Matters, saddle shoes were part of Steve Urkel's distinctive, "nerdy" fashion sense
- India Stoker, the protagonist of the 2013 film Stoker, receives a pair of saddle shoes every year on her birthday.

== See also ==
- List of shoe styles
