= Mary V. Ahern =

American radio and television producer (1922–2021)

Mary Virginia Ahern (October 15, 1922 – May 1, 2021) was an American radio and television producer. She was a key figure producing the award-winning American program Omnibus. She was a producer, an editor and a script writer during what has been described as the "golden age" of television. She became the first curator of the Paley Center for Media dedicated to the history of broadcasting. She helped the Library of Congress to identify television content worthy of historic preservation.

== Early life ==
Mary Virginia Ahern was born in Cambridge, Massachusetts, to Nora and Thomas Ahern on October 15, 1922. Her mother was a teacher and her father was a salesman of insurance and real estate. At Radcliffe College she majored in anthropology before changing to literature. After graduation in 1942, she served in the Army Chemical Warfare Service for three years during the Second World War, supervising production and procuring lethal combat weapons. Following that, she completed all of the management training offered at Harvard University, even though only male students of Harvard were eligible to receive the degree awarded for the training.

== Career ==
Major roles during her professional career stemmed from her work with Robert Saudek. He hired her as a member of the staff for his projects, filling various positions during each project that began in radio and flourished in the early years of television broadcasting. In 1952, Omnibus was one of his creations. It was hosted by Alistair Cooke. The program aired a broad spectrum of cultural interests.

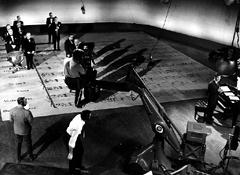
Mary Ahern interested conductor Leonard Bernstein in making his first appearance on Omnibus (photograph of the set for that 1954 production, a huge musical score page covered the floor)

She interested Leonard Bernstein in participating in the first Omnibus program featuring him, in 1954, when he discussed the first movement of Beethoven's fifth symphony. A huge copy of a page from the Beethoven musical score covered the floor of the set. Bernstein would be featured in nine more programs over the lifetime of Omnibus, giving lectures on topics related to the entire spectrum of music, from symphonies, opera, jazz, modern music, musical theater productions, to composers and conducting.

During the decade that followed, the weekly program progressed through the three competing broadcasting companies that dominated the emerging live television industry. It was aired first on Columbia Broadcasting System (CBS), then American Broadcasting Company (ABC), and finally on National Broadcasting Company (NBC). They produced more than 150 live programs.

Omnibus won more than 65 awards during the ten years it was broadcast. Nominated for thirteen Emmy Awards, it was awarded eight of them. The program was awarded two Peabody Awards as well. Considered a historic television program, the diverse programs they aired are held at the Library of Congress and Global ImageWorks, among other archives. The numerous Omnibus programs featuring Bernstein were released in a 4-DVD set for Region 1 and Region 2 in 2010.

Ahern filled different important positions in the Saudek productions that followed. When the Public Broadcasting Service (PBS), began broadcasting, Ahern again was the producer of the Saudek programs featured on it.

In the mid-1970s, the chairman of CBS, William S. Paley, initiated the creation of the Museum of Broadcasting. Ahern was selected as curator of the museum. The museum opened in 1976. Later, it was renamed as the Paley Center for Media.

Ahern was a significant contributor to the expansion of the radio and television holdings in the archives of the Library of Congress in Washington, D.C.

== Personal ==
Ahern died on May 1, 2021, at the age of 98. She was living in a care center in Peabody, Massachusetts, at the time of her death.
