= December 1922 =

Month of 1922

<<	December 1922					>>
Su	Mo	Tu	We	Th	Fr	Sa
					1	2
3	4	5	6	7	8	9
10	11	12	13	14	15	16
17	18	19	20	21	22	23
24	25	26	27	28	29	30
31

December 30, 1922: The Union of Soviet Socialist Republics is created as the first Communist nation, with the Russian Soviet Federative Socialist Republic being joined by the Communist republics established in Ukraine, Belarus, Armenia, Azerbaijan Georgia

The following events occurred in December 1922:

== December 1, 1922 (Friday) ==
- At the Lausanne Conference in Switzerland, İsmet İnönü of Turkey informed the European delegates that his government had decreed that the remaining Greek Christians in Eastern Thrace, numbering nearly one million, were banished and that the Greek citizens had two weeks to leave peacefully.
- The 1922 Land Code that guided the regulation of private and public property in the Soviet Union, took effect after being enacted by the All-Russian Central Executive Committee.
- The Bavarian towns of Passau and Ingolstadt were fined 50,000 gold marks each by the Allied governments for recent attacks on French and British military officers.
- Monica Cobb became the first woman solicitor in the United Kingdom to address a court, speaking at the Birmingham Assizes to prosecute a man for bigamy. The New York Times wrote the next day, "For the first time in the history of England a woman advocate appeared today in court to plead." Cobb had been admitted to the practice of law on November 17.
- The Canadian province of New Brunswick switched from driving on the left side of the road to driving on the right side; the resulting slaughter of oxen & increase in beef supplies was reportedly described in Lunenburg County, Nova Scotia as "The Year of Free Beef."

== December 2, 1922 (Saturday) ==
- The Uqair Protocol was signed at the Saudi fort of Uqair, defining the borders between the Sultanate of Nejd (now part of Saudi Arabia) and Iraq (at the time a British mandate), as well as between Nejd and the Sheikhdom of Kuwait. The result was that Kuwait lost two-thirds of its territory to the Saudis and to Iraq. The treaty provided for the creation of two "neutral zones" of desert land for the benefit of the then-nomadic Bedouin people who wandered regularly between the two nations. The Saudi Arabian–Kuwaiti neutral zone of 2,230 square miles (5,800 km^{2}) existed until 1970 and the Saudi Arabian–Iraqi neutral zone of 2,720 square miles (7,000 km^{2}) until 1982, when the affected nations divided the lands.
- The body of Annie "Ruby" Hendry, a white schoolteacher, was found in Perry, Florida. In the course of searching for her killer, white citizens killed four black men and burned down buildings in the black section of town over the next two weeks.
- Prince Andrew of Greece and Denmark was sentenced to lifelong exile from Greece for disobeying orders during the disastrous Greco-Turkish War, after pressure on the Greek government from the United Kingdom and other Allied nations to prevent the Prince from being sentenced to a long prison term or execution.
- The Republican caucus of the U.S. Senate voted to drop further pursuit of a bill that would have made lynching a federal crime, after being unable to stop a filibuster by Senator Lee Slater Overman, a Democrat from North Carolina. The proposed law, drafted by U.S. Representative Leonidas C. Dyer, had overwhelmingly passed in the U.S. House of Representatives.
- Queen's University beat the Edmonton Elks, 13 to 1, to win the Grey Cup of Canadian football.
- A valise containing all but one of Ernest Hemingway's unpublished manuscripts was stolen while Hemingway had stopped at the Gare de Lyon railway station in Paris, where his wife Hadley Richardson had been preparing to catch a train to Switzerland to join Hemingway, who was on assignment to cover the Lausanne Conference. The valise and its contents were never recovered.
- Born: Leo Gordon, American character actor, in Brooklyn, New York (d. 2000)

== December 3, 1922 (Sunday) ==
- Prince Andrew of Greece and wife Princess Alice of Battenberg boarded HMS Calypso, a British warship, bringing along their 17-month old son, Phillip, and emigrated to France. Phillip, who would be sent a few years later to live with Alice's mother in the United Kingdom, would grow up to marry Princess Elizabeth, heir to the British throne, in 1947 and, in 1952, would become the Prince Consort on her accession to the throne as Queen.
- The first radio station in Puerto Rico, WKAQ-AM, began broadcasting.

== December 4, 1922 (Monday) ==
- U.S. President Warren G. Harding presented a federal budget of over three billion U.S. dollars to Congress for the fiscal year beginning July 1, 1923. Harding said that the federal deficit would be reduced by more than half from nearly $700 million to less than $300 million ($273,038,712).
- Britain's House of Lords voted overwhelmingly to approve the Irish Free State Constitution Act 1922 on its third reading, with the only dissent coming from Lord Carson, who had blocked home rule in 1914 as Leader of the Opposition in the House of Commons.
- Died: Hermann Baagøe Storck, 83, Danish architect and heraldist

== December 5, 1922 (Tuesday) ==
- Following the lead of the House of Lords, the British House of Commons approved the Irish Free State Constitution Act 1922, sanctioning the new Constitution of the Irish Free State. The Act and the Constitution were given royal assent that evening at 6 o'clock, formally granting independence to Ireland.
- Royal assent was given to the Irish Free State (Consequential Provisions) Act 1922, granting Northern Ireland (the six predominantly Protestant counties of Ireland) 30 days (a period referred to in the press as the "Ulster month" because Ulster was the region containing six Northern counties) to decide whether to exercise its option to not be included in the Irish Free State.
- The Russian government closed all of Petrograd's Catholic churches.
- José Sánchez-Guerra y Martínez announced his resignation as Prime Minister of Spain and that of his cabinet of ministers after nine months in office.
- Convicted American murderer Clara Phillips, nicknamed "The Tiger Woman", escaped from the women's section of the Los Angeles County Jail by sawing through the bars and climbing out the window of her cell. She would remain at large for more than four months before being arrested in Honduras and returned to the United States.
- Born: William Davidson, American businessman, in Detroit, Michigan (d. 2009)

== December 6, 1922 (Wednesday) ==
- The Irish Free State was established by proclamation of King George V of the United Kingdom. Tim Healy, who had been an Irish member of the UK House of Commons, represented the King as the nation's Governor-General. At a ceremony in Dublin, the Union Jack was lowered in front of Healy's lodge and the new orange, white and green flag was raised in its place.
- Georges Clemenceau spoke in Washington, D.C., during his American lecture tour and visited Woodrow Wilson at his home.
- Born: Lloyd Gomez, American serial killer who murdered 9 homeless men over 12 months in 1950 and 1951; in Caliente, Nevada (executed, 1953)
- Died: Hason Raja, 67, Indian Bengali mystic poet and songwriter

== December 7, 1922 (Thursday) ==
- The day after the Irish Free State came into existence, both houses of the Parliament of Northern Ireland voted unanimously to exercise the option to not remain part of the new nation. The six predominantly-Protestant northern counties approved a resolution to remain in a union with Britain, and the UK adopted its present name of the United Kingdom of Great Britain and Northern Ireland. The Anglo-Irish Treaty had included a 30-day option for Northern Ireland to decide whether to be part of the Free State.
- Seán Hales, a member of the Dáil Éireann, the lower house of the parliament of the Irish Free State, was shot to death by a member of the Irish Republican Army who had been against the Anglo-Irish Treaty. Another member of parliament, Patrick O'Malley, was wounded in the shooting, which took place as both men were leaving their hotel to attend the session of Parliament.

== December 8, 1922 (Friday) ==
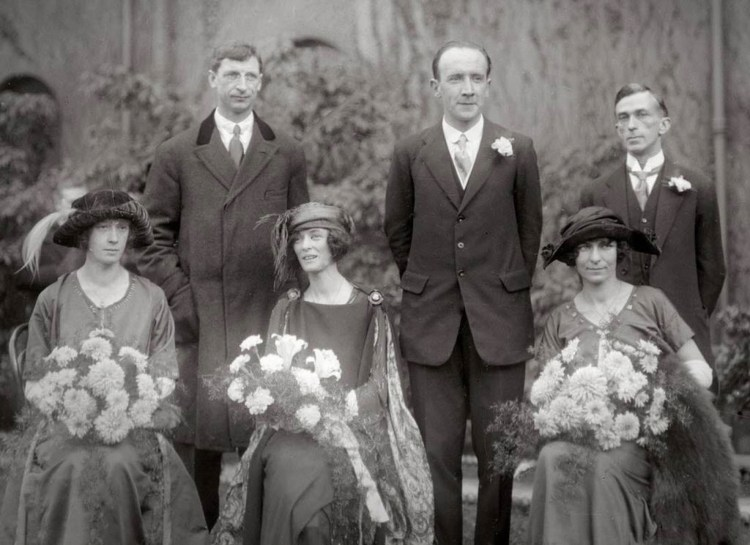
O'Connor (top right) as best man at the wedding of O'Higgins in 1921

- After an emergency cabinet meeting in the newly independent Irish Free State, the new government carried out the executions of four Irish Republican Army leaders who had led the takeover of the Four Courts in Dublin in April. Executed by hanging at Mountjoy Prison were Rory O'Connor, 39; Joe McKelvey, 24; Liam Mellows, 30; and Richard Barrett, 32. Irish Free State Justice Minister Kevin O'Higgins signed the order authorizing the death penalty, one day after the IRA assassination of Seán Hales. Ironically, O'Connor had been the best man at the wedding of O'Higgins 14 months earlier.
- Former Prime Minister of Spain Manuel García Prieto, Marquis of Alhucemas, formed a government following the resignation of the previous cabinet three days earlier.
- A lynch mob in Perry, Florida, numbering more than 3,000 people, stopped the transport of two African-American prisoners suspected of the December 2 murder of a white teacher. Charley Wright was given a mock trial that evening, pronounced guilty, and then burned to death by the mob. The other prisoner, Albert Young, was turned over to the custody of the sheriff of Taylor County but taken from jail by a different mob on December 12 and shot to death.
- In one of the worst disasters in the history of the U.S. state of Oregon, about 24 city blocks of the business district in Astoria were destroyed by a fire that burned under the streets. The town had been constructed on a foundation of wooden pilings and spread quickly, destroying the town's department stores, hotels, banks and many other businesses and homes.
- Appearing in person at a meeting of both houses of Congress, U.S. President Warren G. Harding delivered his State of the Union message to Congress. "It is four years since the World War ended", Harding said, "but the inevitable readjustment of the social and economic order is not more than barely begun." Harding spoke at length about the country's recent labor strife and recommended the creation of a non-partisan tribunal to replace the current Labor Board. On the matter of Prohibition he said, "The day is unlikely to come when the Eighteenth Amendment will be repealed. The fact may as well be recognized and our course adapted accordingly."
- Born: Lucian Freud, German painter; in Berlin (d. 2011)
- Died: Mary Marcy, American socialist (b. 1877)

== December 9, 1922 (Saturday) ==
- The National Assembly of Poland chose the nation's first President, with Foreign Minister Gabriel Narutowicz receiving 289 votes and Maurycy Zamoyski 227 votes.
- The Second London Conference began, with the purpose of once again talking about reparations. British Prime Minister Bonar Law made a surprising statement when he said that the Balfour Note no longer existed for the British government and indicated that Britain would consider canceling France's debt if a new reparations settlement made it possible.
- The American radio station WJZ made the first broadcast that could be heard across the Atlantic Ocean. Shortly after midnight, with the benefit of an increase in the wattage of the broadcast signal, listeners overseas were able to hear the Star-Spangled Banner, followed by a voice saying WJZ repeatedly, then a greeting from the British consul-general in New York to British listeners. Afterward, at 12:30 in the morning, Vaughn De Leath sang her new hit, "Oliver Twist", commissioned to be played on a phonograph in theaters showing the newly released silent film of the same name. Afterward, a jazz orchestra called "Black and White Boys" played "God Save the King" and a person read aloud the 23rd Psalm from the King James Version of the Bible.
- German physicist Erwin Schrödinger delivered his inaugural lecture at the University of Zürich, contributing to the history of quantum theory.
- By royal assent, the office of Governor of Northern Ireland was created as the principal officer and British representative for the six northern counties of Ireland, to assume the powers previously held by the Lord Lieutenant of Ireland, whose office had been abolished with the creation of the Irish Free State after having governed the entire island for 750 years.
- Born: Redd Foxx (stage name for John Elroy Sanford), African-American comedian and actor known for the TV situation comedy Sanford and Son; in St. Louis (d. 1991)

== December 10, 1922 (Sunday) ==
- Japan gave up its control of Jiaozhou Bay Territory, which had originally been leased by the German Empire from Imperial China, and seized by Japan in 1914. Possession of the bay, located on the Shandong Peninsula at Jiaozhou Bay and with a capital at Qingdao, reverted to China.
- The 1922 Nobel Prizes were awarded in Stockholm. The recipients were Niels Bohr of Denmark for Physics, Francis William Aston of the United Kingdom (Chemistry), Archibald Hill of the United Kingdom and Otto Fritz Meyerhof of Germany (Physiology or Medicine), Jacinto Benavente of Spain (Literature) and Fridtjof Nansen of Norway (Peace).
- Died: Clement Wragge, 70, English-born Australian meteorologist who originated (in 1887) the modern practice of giving people's names to storms.

== December 11, 1922 (Monday) ==
- The Second London Conference of four Prime Ministers broke up with no agreement in place except to meet again in Paris on January 2.
- British couple Edith Thompson and Frederick Bywaters were found guilty of the murder of Edith's husband, Percy Thompson, and sentenced to death. They were both hanged 15 days later.

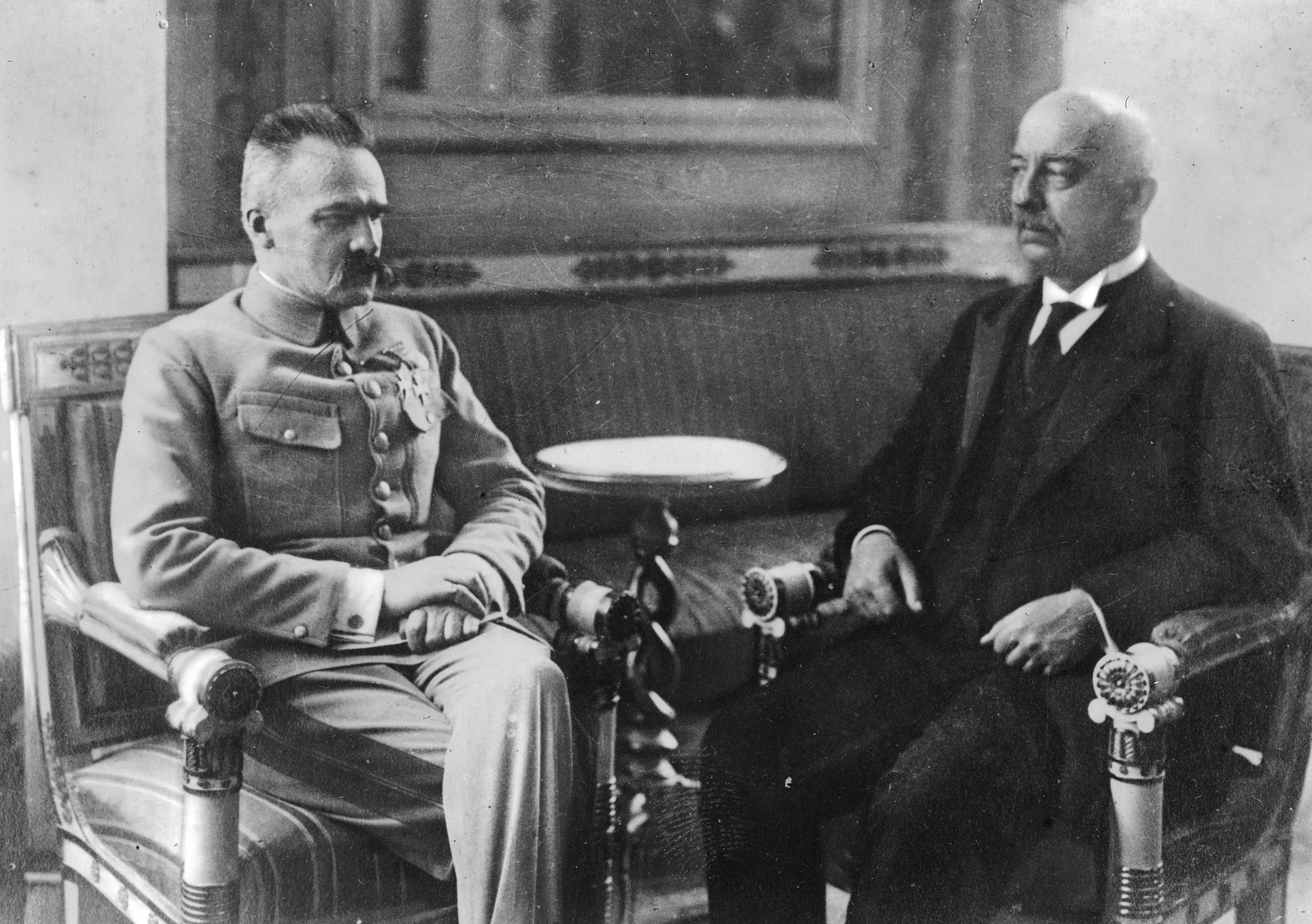
Marshal Pilsudski (left) turns power over to Narutowicz

- Gabriel Narutowicz was inaugurated as the first President of Poland amid violent rioting by an estimated 20,000 protesters, blamed on a speech made the day before by General Jozef Haller, commander-in-chief of the Army of Poland. According to an Associated Press account, the protesters, "mostly students and school boys, sought to prevent the inaugural ceremony" and "pelted the new President with snowballs" as he was being driven to the National Assembly Chamber. In clashes with police, four protesters were killed, and more than 100 injured, ten of them seriously. After the inauguration, Narutowicz went to his new official residence, the Belweder Palace, where Field Marshal Józef Piłsudski (who had used the title "Naczelnik Państwa", literally Leader of the Nation) transferred his authority to an elected leader.
- The Irish Free State Seanad, the Senate (upper house) of Ireland's parliament (the Oireachtas) met for its first session and elected Lord Glenavy as its first chairman (Cathaoirleach).
- Born:
  - Dilip Kumar (stage name for Mohammed Yusuf Khan), Indian Hindi cinema ("Bollywood") film producer and actor; in Peshawar, British India (present-day Khyber Pakhtunkhwa, Pakistan) (d. 2021)
  - Maila Nurmi, Finnish actress and television personality; in Petsamo (d. 2008)
  - Grace Paley, American short story author; in the Bronx, New York City (d. 2007)
  - Noah Hutchings, American evangelist and radio personality known for the syndicated program Your Watchman On The Wall; in Messer, Oklahoma (d. 2015)
- Died: William G. Henderson, 40, American motorcycle manufacturer and inductee into the Motorcycle Hall of Fame, was killed in an accident while testing the latest model from his Ace Motor Corporation, when he collided with an automobile at an intersection in Philadelphia.

== December 12, 1922 (Tuesday) ==
- The Duke of Abercorn, an English native and peer in the British House of Lords, became the first Governor of Northern Ireland.
- A box of chocolates arrived at the Home Secretary's Office for W.C. Bridgeman. The police found it contained arsenic and suspected the same person who poisoned police commissioner William Horwood the previous month.
- A disarmament conference in Moscow among Russia, the Baltic states and Poland broke up without an agreement.
- The Labour Party started a filibuster that kept the House of Commons sitting continuously from 3 p.m. until 7 a.m. the next morning. The filibuster was a form of protest against the government for its decision to adjourn Parliament on Friday until the middle of January without addressing Britain's unemployment problem.
- Born:
  - Raja Chelliah, Indian economist who co-founded the Madras School of Economics and reformed nationwide tax policy; in Palayamkottai, Madras Presidency (now in Tamil Nadu state)(d. 2009)
  - Christian Dotremont, Belgian painter and poet; in Tervuren (d. 1979)
  - Edythe Perlick, American baseball player with 851 games in eight seasons in the AAGPBL for the Racine Belles; in Chicago (d. 2003)
- Died: John Wanamaker, 84, American merchant and philanthropist known primarily for creating the business model for the modern "department store" and founding the Wanamaker's chain of outlets. Wanamaker had also served as United States Postmaster General from 1889 to 1893 during the administration of U.S. President Benjamin Harrison.

== December 13, 1922 (Wednesday) ==
- Uruguay's President Baltasar Brum engaged in a duel with deadly weapons against his political rival, Luis Alberto de Herrera, in front of several hundred witnesses. The combat took place at an airfield about nine miles (14 kilometers) from Montevideo late in the afternoon. According to an Associated Press report, the two men stood 25 paces apart and fired at each other twice, after their seconds had tried to talk them out of the duel. Whether by intention or accidentally, neither man's bullets struck the other. President Brum challenged Herrera to the duel after Herrera told a newspaper that President Brum had manipulated election results. Under Uruguayan law, dueling was permitted at the time so long as a "tribunal of honor" investigated the truth of the grievances of the challenger.
- The Transcaucasian Socialist Federative Soviet Republic was created as a unified state by the members of a loose federation consisting of the Armenian SSR, the Azerbaijani SSR and the Georgian SSR (which included Abkhazia). The new entity would last for only 17 days before becoming a member of the Soviet Union on December 30.
- At least 15 people were fatally scalded, and 40 injured, in an accident on the Houston East and West Texas Railway at the depot at Humble, Texas. Houston East passenger train number 28 sideswiped a freight train's locomotive, tearing loose a two-inch diameter steam pipe. The pipe crashed into the window of the car on the train reserved for smokers and sprayed the compartment with its boiling contents.
- The first trial in the Herrin Massacre began in Marion, Illinois.
- Irish irregulars took Carrick-on-Suir.
- Died: Hannes Hafstein, 61, Icelandic politician and poet

== December 14, 1922 (Thursday) ==
- British Prime Minister Bonar Law warned the House of Commons that Germany was very near to complete economic collapse. Law said in a speech in the Commons also that the UK could not repay war loans from the United States until Britain was repaid for its loans to the Allies or when Germany made its reparation payments earmarked for Britain.
- The Ministry of Education of Soviet Russia ordered that schoolchildren were to be taught that Santa Claus and angels were myths. The protocol was part of a protocol pushed by the Russian Communist Party described by them as "a battle against all religious holiday-making" and was premised on the idea that "holidays leave a psychologically bad impression on children due to decorations and legends of 'decadent religions.'"
- Born:
  - Nikolay Basov, Soviet Russian physicist and 1964 Nobel laureate for his work in quantum electronics; in Usman, Soviet Russia (d. 2001)
  - Gasret Aliev, Soviet soldier awarded the title Hero of the Soviet Union for gallantry in the Battle of the Dnieper in World War II; in Khnov, Gorskaya ASSR, Soviet Russia (d. 1981)
  - Isadore S. Jachman, German-born Jewish U.S. Army staff sergeant awarded the Medal of Honor for gallantry in the Battle of the Bulge in World War II in defending the Belgian village of Flamierge from German Army attack; in Berlin (killed in action, 1945)

== December 15, 1922 (Friday) ==
- Vladimir Lenin had a second stroke.

== December 16, 1922 (Saturday) ==
- Gabriel Narutowicz, the first President of Poland, was shot and killed after just five days in office. President Nartuowicz was attending an exhibition at the Zachęta, Poland's national art gallery, when he was approached by an artist, Eligiusz Niewiadomski, who fired three shots into the President's back at close range. Narutowicz died almost instantly after being shot.
- Elections were held for the 75-seat Australian House of Representatives. The incumbent Nationalist Party, led by Prime Minister Billy Hughes and holding 37 seats before the vote, lost 11 seats, while Matthew Charlton's Australian Labor Party gained three for a 29 to 26 edge over the Nationalists. Nevertheless, the Nationalists were able to maintain their coalition with Earle Page's Country Party with 40 seats overall, and Hughes continued as Prime Minister until a break with Page a few months later.
- The Ladies Ontario Hockey Association, the first major ice hockey league for women, was founded in London, Ontario, with 20 teams.
- Born: Earl F. Ziemke, American military historian, in Milwaukee, Wisconsin (d. 2007)

== December 17, 1922 (Sunday) ==
- The last British troops left Dublin and the last British military installation, the Marlborough Barracks, was formally handed over to the Irish National Army, which would later rename it the McKee Barracks.
- Józef Piłsudski was made Chief of the Polish General Staff to replace Władysław Sikorski (who became Prime Minister of Poland) as well as acting president after the assassination of Narutowicz.
- Jenks Harris, an actor with Universal Studios, led a gang of five other people and robbed the local bank of Piru, California of $11,000. Harris told the police that he had gotten the idea while he was playing a minor part in a Universal production that had been filmed near Piru.
- The British cargo ship SS Smerdis sank in the River Mersey at Liverpool after colliding with another ship, SS City of London, drowning 10 of her 18 crew.
- Born: Alan Voorhees, transportation engineer and urban planner, in Highland Park, New Jersey (d. 2005)

== December 18, 1922 (Monday) ==
- Five men hijacked an armored car outside of the United States Mint in Denver, Colorado, taking more than $200,000 worth of newly printed five-dollar bills (equivalent to $337,700,000 a century later that were being loaded for shipment within the Denver federal reserve district. During the gun battle during the robbery, one of the armed guards on the armored car, Charles Linton was killed, while a gang member, Nicholas Trainor, was mortally wounded. The gang escaped only 90 seconds after the raid had begun. Trainor's body was left inside the getaway car used in the robbery and abandoned in a local garage. Roughly $80,000 of the original $200,000 stolen would be located in February in Minnesota.
- At least 10 trade union members were killed by Fascists in the Italian city of Turin the day after the murder of two Fascist Party members. One of the men killed, Pietro Ferrero, was tied up and then dragged behind a truck.
- The de Bothezat helicopter, nicknamed "The Flying Octopus" because of its four massive rotors, made its first flight, with trials taking place at McCook Field in Dayton, Ohio. Designed by Ivan Jerome and George de Bothezat under contract with the United States Army, the helicopter set records for duration of airtime (2 minutes and 45 seconds) and altitude (30 feet (9.1 m)) but was difficult to control and incapable of proceeding into the wind.
- For the first time in more than 123 years, an Irish parliament passed legislation, as the Seanad Éireann followed the lead of the Dáil Éireann in approving the "Adaptation of Enactments Bill".
- Born:
  - Carlos Altamirano, Chilean socialist politician, General Secretary of the Socialist Party, in Santiago (d. 2019)
  - Monir Shahroudy Farmanfarmaian, Iranian artist, in Qazvin; the Monir Museum in Tehran is named in her honor (d. 2019)
  - Jack Brooks, U.S. Congressman for Texas for 42 consecutive years from 1953 to 1995; in Crowley, Louisiana (d. 2012)
  - Larry D. Mann, Canadian character actor on television and film; in Toronto (d. 2014)

== December 19, 1922 (Tuesday) ==
- In Dublin, seven men were executed, after being arrested by Free Irish State troops less than a week earlier, on December 13, after being convicted of sabotaging trains in County Kildare.
- Morehouse Parish, Louisiana was put under martial law by Governor John M. Parker due to threats from the Ku Klux Klan.
- Died:
  - Friedrich Delitzsch, 72, German historian and expert on the ancient empire of Assyria and other nations in Mesopotamia.
  - Lot Flannery, 86, Irish-born American sculptor known for designing the first and oldest Abraham Lincoln statue (in 1868) of U.S. President Abraham Lincoln.
  - Clementina Black, 69, British feminist and novelist

== December 20, 1922 (Wednesday) ==
- Sir Percy Cox, the British Administrator for the Mandate of Iraq, agreed to a joint Anglo-Iraqi declaration to create a government for the Kurdish people as long as the rival Kurdish leaders could create a constitution and agree on boundaries for a Kurdish state. Sheikh Mahmud Barzanji, who had been named by Cox as governor of southern Kurdistan, rejected the proposal to work with the British and declared himself the reigning monarch of a Kingdom of Kurdistan, allied with Turkey against the British, bringing an end to any prospect of an independent Kurdish nation.
- Poland's National Assembly voted for a new president to replace Gabriel Narutowicz, who had been assassinated six days earlier. Stanisław Wojciechowski, the former Minister of the Interior, received 298 votes to 221 for Kazimierz Morawski.
- Will H. Hays, director of the Motion Picture Producers and Distributors of America, lifted the ban against employment of actor Roscoe "Fatty" Arbuckle and allowed him to make films again.
- At the age of seven, Jagaddipendra Narayan became the new Maharaja of the Indian princely state of Cooch Behar upon the death of his father Jitendra Narayan. While the princely states of India would be abolished in 1949, with Cooch Behar becoming part of the state of West Bengal, Jagaddipendra would continue to have the maharaja title and receive a pension up until his death in 1970.
- The play Antigone by Jean Cocteau with incidental music by Arthur Honegger premiered in Paris.
- Born:
  - Agnes Nixon, American television writer and producer who created numerous successful soap operas, including One Life to Live and All My Children; as Agnes Eckhardt in Chicago (d. 2016)
  - Geoff Mack (stage name for Albert Geoffrey McElhinney), Australian songwriter and singer who authored the song "I've Been Everywhere" in 1959 as a poetically arranged list of towns in Australia; in Surrey Hills, Victoria (d. 2017). Mack later rewrote the song for Western Hemisphere locations (in 1962) and the form has been repeated in other adaptations.
  - Charita Bauer, American soap opera actress known for the soap opera Guiding Light; in Newark, New Jersey (d. 1985)
  - J. R. Salamanca, American novelist; in St. Petersburg, Florida (d. 2013)
- Died: Séamus Dwyer, 36, former member of the Irish Parliament who had voted in favor of the Anglo-Irish Treaty but then lost his bid for re-election, was assassinated at his Dublin liquor store by a gunman who fired two shots at him. The killing came the day after the execution by the Irish Free State forces of seven IRA members. Bobby Bonfield, who committed the murder, was later killed by Free State forces in reprisal.

== December 21, 1922 (Thursday) ==
- Aleksandras Stulginskis was formally elected as President of Lithuania by the Baltic nation's Constituent Assembly, after having served as the Assembly's speaker and acting president of Lithuania since 1920.
- Pierce Butler was confirmed by the U.S. Senate as the newest associate justice of the U.S. Supreme Court, approved 61 to 8 after a 16-day period of hearings. Voting against Butler were five Democrats and three Republicans. With 61 of 69 voting Senators approving, the two-thirds majority was easily met, while another 29 U.S. Senators abstained from voting.
- The Institution of Chemical Engineers (IChemE) was incorporated in the United Kingdom as a non-profit organization. Almost 100 years later, it would have a membership of 33,000 engineers worldwide.
- Aleen Cust became the first woman to be licensed as a veterinary surgeon in the United Kingdom. She had already been in practice for 20 years at the time of her acceptance.
- Born:
  - Charles Joseph Fletcher, American aviation inventor who patented the "Glidemobile", one of the first hovercraft vehicles capable of riding a cushion of air above water; in Franklin, New Jersey (d. 2011)
  - Paul Winchell (stage name for Paul Wilchinsky), American ventriloquist (known for his dummy, "Jerry Mahoney") and comedian; in New York City (d. 2005)
  - Itubwa Amram, Nauruan pastor who served as the first Speaker of the Parliament of Nauru; in Nauru (d. 1989)
- Died: Sarah Elizabeth Doyle, 92, American educator who led the successful campaign (in 1891) for women to be admitted as students at Brown University, and who co-founded the Rhode Island School of Design.

== December 22, 1922 (Friday) ==
- The Belgium–Luxembourg Economic Union (Belgisch-Luxemburgse Economische Unie or BLEU) was established when Luxembourg's Chamber of Deputies voted, 27 to 13, to ratify the 1921 treaty between the neighboring European nations of Belgium and Luxembourg, setting their currencies (the Belgian franc and the Luxembourg franc) at a fixed ratio and dropping tariffs on trade between them. The economic union would be the first step toward an economic union of the nations of Europe, with Belgium and Luxembourg forming a cooperative union with the Netherlands (Benelux) in 1944, followed by the Benelux nations agreeing with France, Italy and West Germany to create the European Coal and Steel Community (ECSC) in 1951, the European Economic Community (EEC) in 1957, and the European Union in 1993, and as one author would note later, "No region in the world has been so successful in creating voluntary economic unions of sovereign states as western Europe.
- The 275-year-old Cathedral-Basilica of Notre-Dame de Québec in Quebec City in Canada was gutted by an early morning fire. The building had been constructed in 1647 and contained irreplaceable manuscripts and a 17th-century painting by Anthony van Dyck of the Crucifixion of Jesus.
- The bodies of two men who had been kidnapped and murdered by the Ku Klux Klan in Mer Rouge, Louisiana on August 24 were found in La Fourche Lake. Fillmore W. Daniels and Thomas F. Richards were among five men who had been taken by Klansmen on August 24 in front of hundreds of people who were attending a barbecue dinner. W. C. Andrews, J. L. Daniels and C. D. Davenport were beaten severely and then released near the town of Collinston.
- Jean Cocteau created an adaptation of Sophocles' Antigone at Théâtre de l'Atelier in Paris.
- Died: Abdullah Muhammad Shah II, 80, Sultan of Perak (part of the Federated Malay States since 1874.

== December 23, 1922 (Saturday) ==
- Pope Pius XI promulgated his first encyclical, Ubi arcano Dei consilio.
- The 10th All-Russian Congress of Soviets opened at the Grand Opera House in Moscow with more than 3,000 legislators, 90 percent of whom were Communist Party members, in order to give approval of the latest planning programs of the Russian government. On the agenda was a proposal from the Ukraine Communist Party for a treaty of union of the Communist nations.
- Vladimir Lenin began dictating his notes expressing his views on the party leadership and the matter of who should succeed him. He expressed reservations about all the party leaders, but was particularly critical of Joseph Stalin.
- The British cargo ship SS Maid of Delos foundered in a gale in St George's Channel off Skomer, Pembrokeshire, killing all 26 of her crew.
- Born: Micheline Ostermeyer, French athlete and concert pianist, in Rang-du-Fliers, Pas-de-Calais département (d. 2001)
- Died: Bernard Kirk, 22, American college football player and star end for the University of Michigan, died six days after a December 17 auto accident.

== December 24, 1922 (Sunday) ==
- The Workers Party of America opened its second party congress at the Labor Temple on East 84th Street in New York, with a little more than 70 delegates in attendance.
- Born:
  - Ava Gardner, American film actress; in Smithfield, North Carolina (d. 1990)
  - Jonas Mekas, Lithuanian-born American avant-garde cinema producer; in Semeniškiai (d. 2019)

== December 25, 1922 (Monday) ==
- Delegates of the Workers Party of America, a predecessor to the Communist Party USA, declared for the "dictatorship of the proletariat and the supplanting of the existing capitalist government with a soviet government", but abandoned agitating for armed insurrection in order to avoid being prosecuted by the American government.
- Born: Hiroshi Ohshita, Japanese baseball outfielder with 301 career home runs at 1,226 RBIs, later elected to the Japanese Baseball Hall of Fame; in Kobe, Hyōgo Prefecture (d. 1979)
- Died: Joseph MacDonagh, 39, Irish independence activist who had recently been re-elected to the Irish Free State parliament while in prison, died of peritonitis two days after emergency surgery for a ruptured appendix.

== December 26, 1922 (Tuesday) ==
- By a vote of 3 to 1 the Allied Reparations Committee declared Germany to be in voluntary default on its World War I reparations due to a delayed timber delivery to France. Great Britain cast the only dissenting vote.
- Italy's Premier Benito Mussolini ordered a new design for Italian coinage that would bear the fasces.

== December 27, 1922 (Wednesday) ==
- The Japanese aircraft carrier Hosho was commissioned, the first ship designed from the beginning to be a carrier.
- The science fiction film The Man from M.A.R.S., notable for using "Teleview", an early 3-D process, was released in theaters under the title M.A.R.S.. A preview showing of the film had been given to the press on October 13.
- "For the first time in 3,277 years," objects were taken out of the Tomb of Tutankhamun as employees of New York's Metropolitan Museum of Art and the government of Egypt brought out a stretcher holding an intricately carved 14" x 12" x 12" box containing objects that had been buried with the boy pharaoh. Pictures of the contents taken by Egyptologist Harry Burton began a 10-year project in photographing the Tomb of Tutankhamun and the individual items excavated from within.

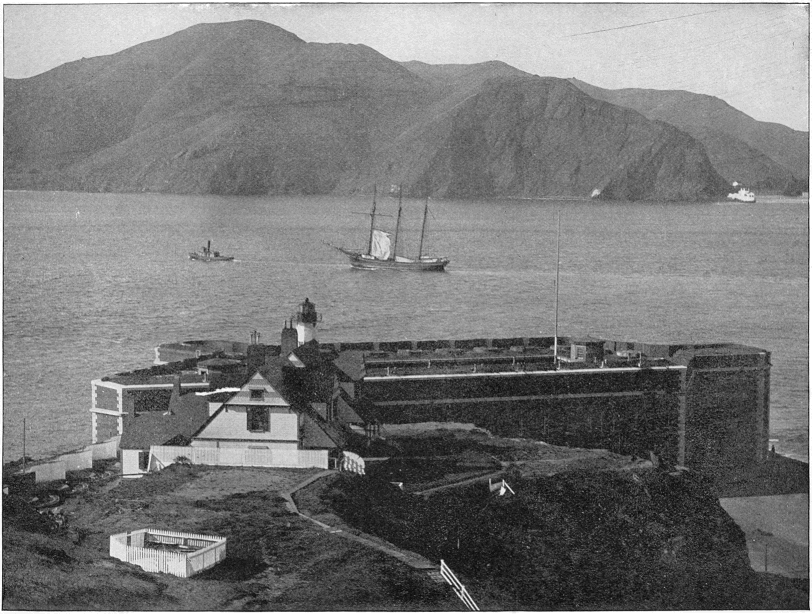
Future home of the bridge across the Golden Gate strait

- At a press conference in Chicago, structural engineer Joseph Strauss unveiled his plans for what would be the world's longest bridge, a span over the "Golden Gate", the strait between San Francisco Bay and the Pacific Ocean. "If and when erected," The New York Times noted, "the structure will be the greatest in point of magnitude and span in the world." Construction would begin ten years later and the bridge would open in 1937.

== December 28, 1922 (Thursday) ==
- Delegates from the Communist Party-led governments of the Russian SFSR, Transcaucasian SFSR, Ukrainian SSR and the Byelorussian SSR met in Moscow to approve a political union of the four independent republics as a larger nation.
- A letter from President Harding to Senator Henry Cabot Lodge was read in the Senate. In the message Harding stated that the United States would not call a world economic conference unless European nations accepted that cancellation of war debts owed to America would not be considered.
- The 745 feet (227 m)-long Oregon City Bridge opened for traffic over the Willamette River between Oregon City and West Linn.
- Born:
  - Stan Lee, comic book creator and president of Marvel Comics; as Stanley Martin Lieber, in New York City (d. 2018)
  - Ramapada Chowdhury, Indian Bengali language novelist and screenwriter; in Kharagpur, Bengal Presidency, British India (now West Bengal state) (d. 2018)

== December 29, 1922 (Friday) ==
- The Council of People's Commissars re-elected almost all members of the ruling All-Russian Executive Committee", but filled four positions with new members, including Joseph Stalin as Minister of Nationalities, Lev Kamenev as Third Vice President and Grigory Sokolnikov as Minister of Finance. Upon the formation of the Soviet Union the next day, the Council co-ordinated the activities of the member republics.
- The recently published novel Ulysses, written by James Joyce, was banned from sale within the United Kingdom by order of the Director of Public Prosecutions, Archibald Bodkin.
- Zhang Shaozeng (Chang Shao-ts'eng) was confirmed by the Senate of the Republic of China to become the new Prime Minister, after having been nominated on December 19 by President Li Yuanhong.
- France's National Board of Scientific and Industrial Research and Inventions (ORNI, Office national des recherches scientifiques et industrielles et des inventions), a predecessor to the Centre national de la recherche scientifique, was founded by Jules-Louis Breton.
- Germany's floating debt passed one trillion marks. Rudolph Havenstein, the President of the Reichsbank, announced that the national bank had granted credit in the amount one trillion in the last three months of the year "to meet the necessities of German industry." The announcement came after Germany's hyperinflation had been worsened by the printing by the mint of over 100 billion marks in a single week earlier in the month.
- Born:
  - William Gaddis, American novelist known for The Recognitions and J R; in New York City (d. 1998)
  - Heinz Marquardt, German Luftwaffe fighter ace credited with 121 shootdowns of enemy aircraft during World War II; in Braunsberg (d. 2003)

== December 30, 1922 (Saturday) ==
The first Soviet flag

- The Union of Soviet Socialist Republics (referred to alternatively as the USSR or the Soviet Union) was created as a new nation with the ratification by the 2,215 delegates of the First All-Union Congress of Soviets of the Treaty of Creation and the Declaration of Creation. The Congress, based on proportional representation, was composed of 1,727 persons from the Russian SFSR, 364 from the Ukrainian SSR, 91 from the Transcaucasian SSR (consisting of the SSRs of Armenia, Azerbaijan and Georgia), and 33 from the Byelorussian SSR. The delegates, who gathered at the Bolshoi Theater in Moscow, elected a four-member Central Executive Committee to act on behalf of the nation between sessions of the Congress of Soviets, consisting of Mikhail Kalinin (Russia), who was elected chairman; Grigory Petrovsky (Ukraine); Nariman Narimanov (of Azerbaijan, for the Transcaucasian SSR);and Alexander Chervyakov (Byelorussia, later Belarus). The USSR would exist for almost 69 years until being formally dissolved on December 26, 1991.
- Born:
  - Boes Boestami, Indonesian comedian and journalist; in Batavia, Dutch East Indies (now Jakarta) (d. 1970)
  - Rosalind Cartwright, American psychologist who wrote numerous books on the science of REM sleep and dreaming; in New York City (d. 2021)
  - Magín Díaz, Colombian composer and musician; in Mahates (d. 2017)

== December 31, 1922 (Sunday) ==
- France's Prime Minister Raymond Poincaré rejected a proposal by Germany's Chancellor Wilhelm Cuno for a mutual non-aggression pact that would have replaced French troops in the occupied Rhineland (along Germany's border with France) with troops from a world power that had no active interests in the Rhineland. In addition, under Cuno's proposal, neither nation would go to war "for a generation" without a popular referendum to endorse fighting. "To my regret, France has seen fit to reject our proposal," Cuno said in a speech at the Hamburg Stock Exchange.
- The All India Kshatriya Society, chaired by Raja Nahar Singh, approved a policy for a "ritual purification" for Muslim Rajputs to convert from Islam to Hinduism. The policy applied to persons whose ancestors had been Hindus forcibly converted to Islam.
- The Nine-Power Treaty, signed in Washington, D.C., on February 6 by nine nations (Japan, Great Britain, the United States, France, Italy, Belgium, the Netherlands, Portugal and the Republic of China) with written affirmations of the sovereignty and territorial integrity of China, went into effect pending ratification by all the signatories.
- All remaining foreign post offices in China, which had been allowed to issue their own postage stamps for mail to be sent between China and the issuing nation, were closed in accordance with the Nine-Power Treaty.
- U.S. Supreme Court Justice Mahlon Pitney, having suffered a stroke, retired from the bench 10 days after his colleague, Justice William R. Day, had been replaced by Pierce Butler. U.S. President Harding filled the second vacancy on the Court by nominating Edward Terry Sanford, who would be confirmed by the U.S. Senate shortly afterward.
- The Turkish passenger ship SS Pasha Baghtche foundered in the Sea of Marmara off the Princes' Islands with the loss of 20 lives.
