= Stanisław Wojciechowski =

President of Poland from 1922 to 1926

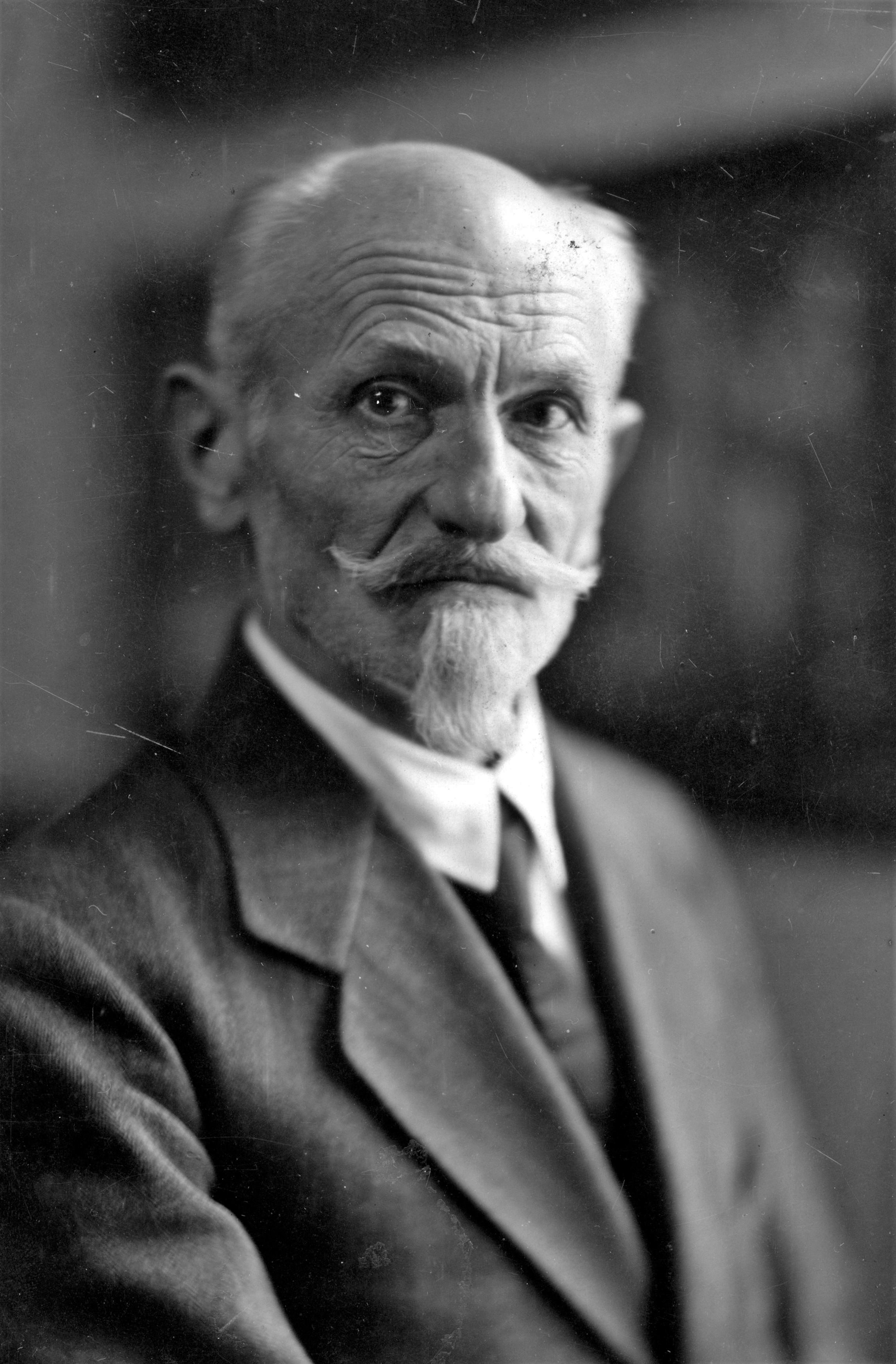
- Wojciechowski c. 1920s

2nd President of Poland
- In office 22 December 1922 – 14 May 1926
- Prime Minister: Władysław Sikorski; Wincenty Witos; Władysław Grabski; Aleksander Skrzyński; Wincenty Witos
- Preceded by: Gabriel Narutowicz; Maciej Rataj (Acting)
- Succeeded by: Maciej Rataj (Acting); Ignacy Mościcki

Minister of Internal Affairs
- In office 16 January 1919 – 9 June 1920
- Prime Minister: Ignacy Jan Paderewski; Leopold Skulski
- Preceded by: Stanisław Thugutt
- Succeeded by: Józef Kuczyński

Personal details
- Born: 15 March 1869 Kalisz, Congress Poland, Russian Empire
- Died: 9 April 1953 (aged 84) Warsaw, Poland
- Resting place: Powązki Cemetery
- Party: Polish People's Party "Piast"
- Spouse: Maria Kiersnowska (m. 1899)
- Children: Edmund - Zofia
- Relatives: Małgorzata Kidawa-Błońska (great-granddaughter)
- Education: University of Warsaw
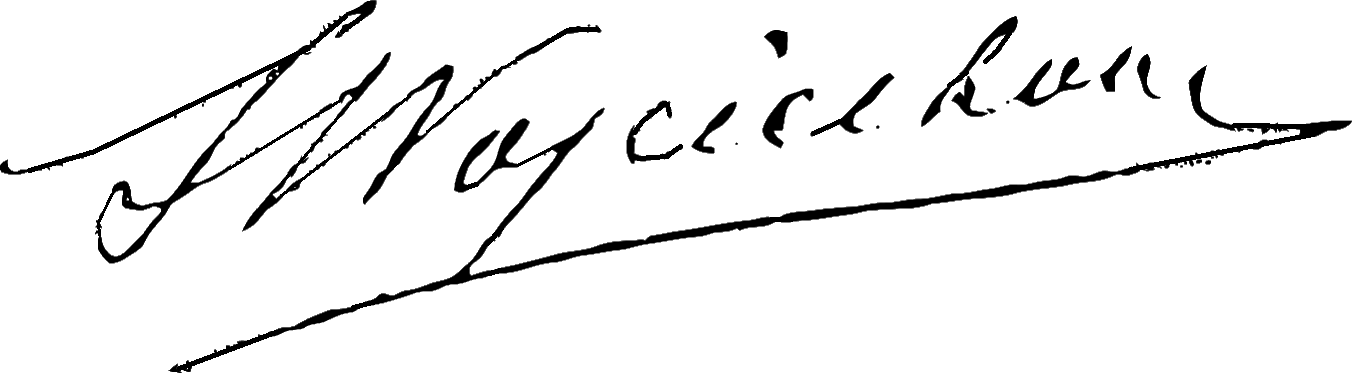
- Signature

Stanisław Wojciechowski (Note: Polish: [staˈɲiswaf vɔjt͡ɕɛˈxɔfskʲi]) (15 March 1869 – 9 April 1953) was a Polish politician and scholar who served as President of Poland between 1922 and 1926, during the Second Polish Republic.

He was elected president in 1922, following the assassination of his predecessor Gabriel Narutowicz. During his presidency, Wojciechowski and his erstwhile friend Józef Piłsudski disagreed on the political direction of the nation. In 1926, Piłsudski staged a military coup, which resulted in Wojciechowski's resignation from office.

== Early life ==
Stanisław Wojciechowski was born on 15 March 1869 in Kalisz into a Polish noble family with strong ties to the intelligentsia. He was one of seven children of Second Lieutenant Feliks Wojciechowski (1825–1881), a caretaker of a prison in Kalisz who participated during the January Uprising, and his wife Florentyna Vorhoff. He was raised in a spirit of patriotism and devotion to his homeland. In 1888, he graduated from the Men's Classical Junior High School in Kalisz and began his studies at the Imperial University of Warsaw, where he studied at the Faculty of Physics and Mathematics until 1891. He belonged to the circle of the most active conspirators, a participant in the secret student groups for self-improvement. Wojciechowski was active during his studies, first in the conspiratorial organisation Association of the Polish Youth "Zet", and later in the burgeoning socialist movement. By 1892, he had abandoned his studies and chosen the life of an exile after his second arrest and detention by the czarist police, first going to Zürich and then Paris. There he learned the trade of typesetter, with which he supported himself.

In 1892, Wojciechowski co-founded the Polish Socialist Party and many nationalists and socialists met in Paris. He travelled several more times illegally to Congress Poland and the Russian Empire and smuggled printing machine components and publications into the country. Together with Piłsudski, he formed the backbone of the socialist movement in Russian Poland. In 1899, he married Maria Wojciechowska, a daughter of a wealthy landowner of szlachta descent.

== Political movements and early career ==
After 1905, he left the Polish Socialist Party over disagreements on the political future of Poland and its relations to the international class struggle. During World War I, Stanisław Wojciechowski believed that Germany posed the biggest threat to Poland and thus decided to stay in Russia rather than side with his erstwhile friend Piłsudski. After the Russian evacuation of Congress Poland in 1915, he moved to Moscow, where he remained active in Polish political circles. After the fall of the Tsarist regime, he was elected president of the Council of Polish Parties' Union, and heavily engaged on behalf of the Polish Army in Russia in 1918. He was forced to leave Moscow under threat of arrest once the Bolshevik regime seized power. On 15 January 1919, the Chief of State nominated him Minister of Internal Affairs, in both the Cabinet of Ignacy Jan Paderewski and Leopold Skulski, whom Wojciechowski replaced during his numerous absences from the country. During this time, Wojciechowski also participated in the drafting of the Polish constitution.

== 1922 presidential elections ==
=== First election ===
In the legislative elections, Wojciechowski served as the candidate for the Senate, though he failed to win a seat. After the legislative elections, a balance appeared between the left and right forces. This situation also preponderated in the National Assembly, which was to select a new president of Poland and produce a new presidential election. Piłsudski did not want to put up his candidacy, and Wincenty Witos was perceived as a person communicating with the right and not paying attention to the interests of rural villages. Therefore, the Polish People's Party "Piast" put forward and appointed Wojciechowski as the new candidate for the presidency, not involved in current political games. He accepted this decision, but when the Polish People's Party "Wyzwolenie" informed him that Gabriel Narutowicz planned to withdraw from the presidential race. Witos persuaded Narutowicz not to do that.

Wojciechowski was defeated in the fourth ballot to Count Maurycy Zamoyski, who received 228 votes and Wojciechowski only reached 152 votes. At the time of the elections, the main candidates were Zamoyski and Wojciechowski. Narutowicz's good result was a surprise. Once the long voting was over, Zamoyski and Narutowicz advanced to the fifth ballot. Narutowicz finally won the election with the support of "Piast" (Wojciechowski was eliminated on the fourth round). Narutowicz prevailed thanks to the votes of the left, of the representatives for national minorities (these representatives were determined to defeat the National Democracy movement) and of the centrist Polish People's Party "Piast". This last group, initially inclined toward Zamoyski, unexpectedly switched its backing to Narutowicz instead. Eventually, Narutowicz won 289 votes, whereas Zamoyski won only 227 votes, and so Narutowicz was elected the first president of the Second Polish Republic.

=== Second election ===
Following the assassination of President Narutowicz by Eligiusz Niewiadomski on 16 December 1922, Marshal of the Sejm Maciej Rataj, who served briefly as acting head of state after the assassination, set the date of a new presidential election on 20 December 1922. The right-wing put forward the candidacy of Professor Kazimierz Morawski. Wojciechowski was nominated again as a compromise candidate. Władysław Sikorski was also suggested as a compromise. Originally, Wincenty Witos recommended that his own party, PSL, vote for Morawski. The left wing of PSL opposed this, however, and decided to vote for Wojciechowski, in connection with the events that led to the murder of Narutowicz. As a result of the internal party discussion, it was decided to support Wojciechowski's candidacy. In the first round, Wojciechowski secured 298 votes, with Morawski only gaining 221 votes. Wojciechowski won the election and became the second president of Poland. After the election, representatives of the National Assembly appeared in Wojciechowski's residence to notify him about his election as president. He considered that the will of the Sejm and the Senate should be followed. Alfons Erdman appeared at Wojciechowski's office and demanded that he abstain from accepting his choice. It was, nevertheless, too late; Wojciechowski decided that a delay in this matter was improper. On 20 December 1922, Wojciechowski took the presidential oath and became president.

== Presidency ==
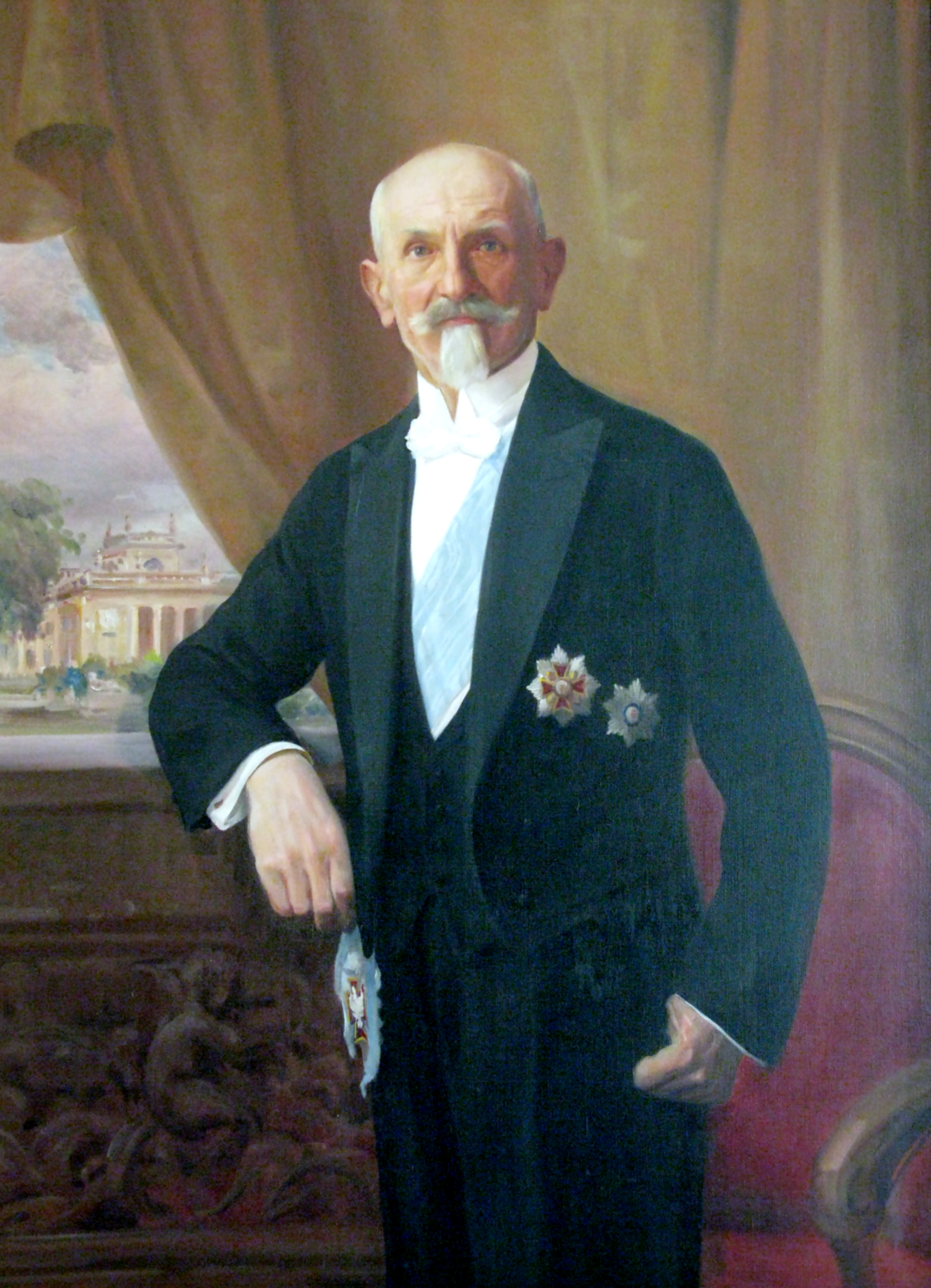
Portrait by Casimir Markievicz (Royal Castle, Warsaw)

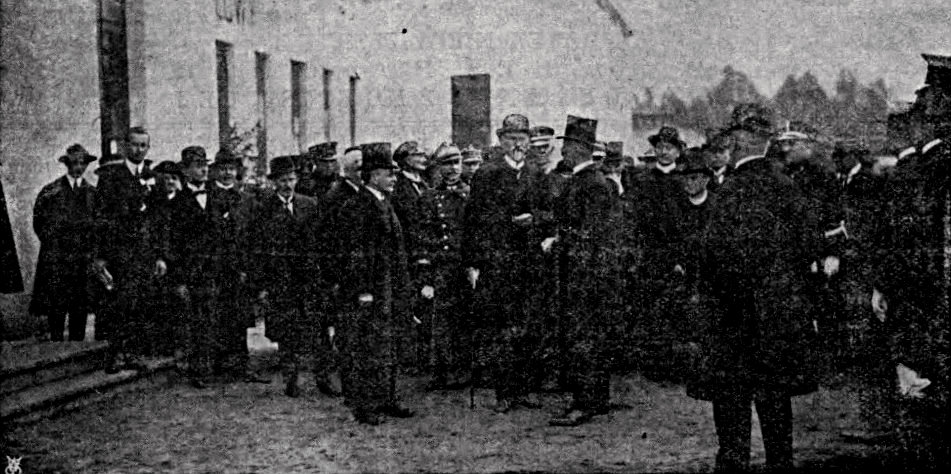
President Wojciechowski in Gniezno to tour the Exhibitions of Agriculture and Commerce, 1925

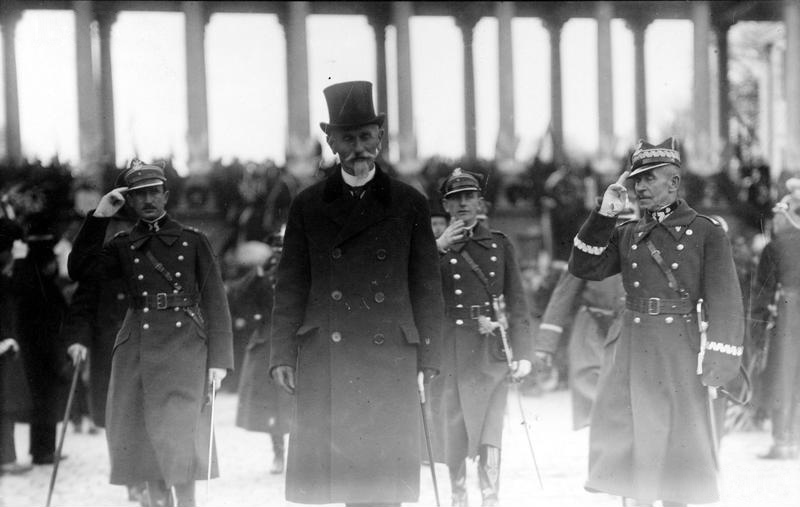
Wojciechowski with General Mariusz Zaruski, mid 1920s

During his presidency, Wojciechowski attempted to be an enthusiastic politician who was involved in the performance of the government. He actively supported the non-parliamentary ministry of Władysław Sikorski and Władysław Grabski. The height of the president's political influence corresponded with Grabski's cabinet period of activity. Wojciechowski participated in the Political Committee of the Council of Ministers and had an impact on the content of ordinances on the currency reform, created under special powers of attorney granted to the cabinet by the Sejm. Wojciechowski attempted to shape the Polish constitutional system by introducing a constructive vote of no confidence. The mission of forming a new government was entrusted to the leader of the largest group participating in the overthrow of the previous cabinet, and when Wojciechowski failed to select a cabinet, he advocated leaving the old cabinet or establishing a non-parliamentary cabinet. Wojciechowski used this method after the fall of the second cabinet of Wincenty Witos when he committed the purpose of setting a new ministry to Stanisław Thugutt. Another indication of Wojciechowski's constitutional system was the adoption, opposite to the provisions of the constitution, that the Sejm was assembling enduringly, and not in the session system. Wojciechowski never closed the session of the Sejm, which was dictated by the constitution.

Wojciechowski tried to maintain good relations with Józef Piłsudski, who was in perpetual dispute with the succeeding cabinets and some parliamentary groups. The reason for the conflict was the organisation of the military authorities. Piłsudski always saw Wojciechowski as a person who would take his side. In June 1923, Stanisław Szeptycki addressed to the Sejm a bill on the highest military authorities, announcing the liquidation of the powerful military council, which Piłsudski served as the chairman, flaring up a sharp dispute between him and the Marshal. Wojciechowski tried to settle this dispute. Accordingly, Piłsudski sent a letter to the president in which he addressed him with the words: "You have acted as a hangover in the matter of honour, which does not respect the rights of honour and forgets that honour belongs to people personally, not officially." Wojciechowski tried to negotiate between the opposing parties, including taking into account the Maciej Rataj's commentaries, who objected to committing the position of Minister of Military Affairs to Władysław Sikorski. Piłsudski did not want to compromise and treated Wojciechowski, as Rataj regarded, defiantly and as a servant.

On 5 September 1924, Wojciechowski visited the Polish city of Lwów (now Lviv, Ukraine). At the end of Kopernika and Legionów Street, an explosive charge was thrown towards the car where the president was travelling. Fortuitously, the bomb did not explode. It was believed that the assassin was Stanisław Steiger, an employee of a commercial company and a student of Jewish law, who was immediately arrested and kept in prison throughout the subsequent trial, and was threatened with the death penalty. The first trial against Steiger took place on 15 and 16 September 1924 before the District Court in Lwów. The prosecutor was Alfred Laniewski, and the defender was lawyer Michał Grek. The Regional Court referred the case to ordinary proceedings with the participation of sworn judges. In the proceedings, Steiger was defended by lawyer Natan Loewenstein. The trial during which Loewenstein gave his defence speech did not take place until 16 December 1925. Steiger spent all this time in custody, but by this time, new circumstances regarding the assassination attempt were revealed. Thanks to the lawyer's speech, which Loewenstein published in Lwów a year later, the accused was cleared of the charges and acquitted. The suspect of the assassination ended up being Teofil Olszewski, from the Ukrainian Military Organization, who subsequently fled Poland by illegally crossing the German border near Bytom and was arrested by the Germans on 3 October 1924. Olszewski was convicted of crossing the border illegally for two weeks in prison, suspended for one year, and then granted political refugee status in Germany and permission to settle in Marienburg (Malbork), close to the Polish border.

On 7 May 1925, Wojciechowski travelled from Warsaw to Kraków with the entire ceremonial held by the president. After receiving a report at the station from the commander of the honour company, Wojciechowski asked him if the soldiers were singing religious songs. After receiving a proof answer, Wojciechowski instructed the soldiers to sing some of them. They sang for about twenty minutes until the train left. Such behaviour of the president caused an understandable sensation in the country.

=== Fall from power ===
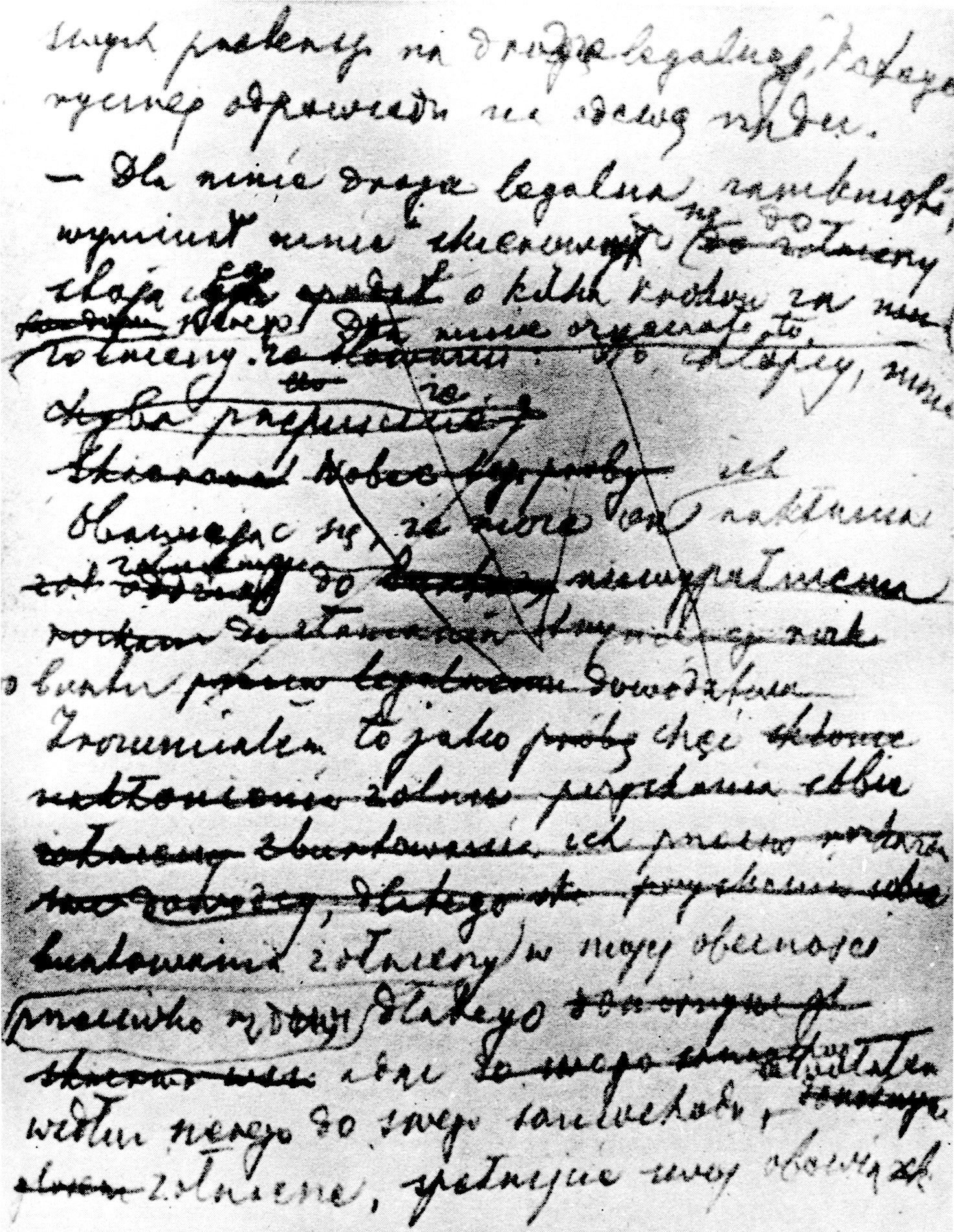
President Wojciechowski's handwritten description of his meeting with Piłsudski on the Poniatowski Bridge during the May Coup in 1926

In November 1925, the government of Prime Minister Władysław Grabski was replaced by the government of Aleksander Skrzyński, which had received support from the National Democrats and the Polish Socialist Party. General Lucjan Żeligowski became the new government's minister of military affairs. However, after the PPS withdrew its support, this government also fell and was replaced by that of Prime Minister Wincenty Witos, formed by Polish People's Party "Piast" and Christian Union of National Unity (Chjeno-Piast). However, the new government had even less popular support than the previous ones, and pronouncements from Józef Piłsudski, who viewed the constant power shifts in the Sejm as chaotic and damaging, set the stage for a coup d'état. Apart from domestic turmoil, Polish politics had been shaken by a trade war with Germany, begun in June 1925, and by the signing of the Treaty of Locarno on 1 December. Under the terms of the treaty, the World War I Western European Allied powers plus Germany guaranteed the inviolability of the German border with Belgium and France as determined by the Treaty of Versailles. On 10 May 1926, a coalition government of Christian Democrats and Agrarians was formed, and that same day, Józef Piłsudski, in an interview with Kurier Poranny (the Morning Courier) newspaper, said that he was "ready to fight the evil" of sejmocracy and promised a "sanation" (restoration to health) of political life. The newspaper edition was confiscated by the authorities.

On the night of 11 to 12 May 1926, a state of alert was declared in the Warsaw military garrison, and some units marched to Rembertów, where they pledged their support to Piłsudski. On 12 May, they marched on Warsaw and captured bridges over the Wisła River. Meanwhile, Wincenty Witos' government declared a state of emergency. At about 17:00 hours, Marshal Piłsudski met Wojciechowski on the Poniatowski Bridge. Major Marian Porwit, who commanded one of the troops loyal to the government, reported to the president, then reported to Piłsudski and witnessed the discussion between the two dignitaries. Piłsudski demanded the resignation of Witos' cabinet, while the President demanded Piłsudski's capitulation. After the failure of negotiations and the president's departure, Major Porwit refused to let Piłsudski cross the bridge. On 14 May, at about 13:00 hours, Witos' cabinet decided to move from Belweder to Wilanów. Wojciechowski allowed this decision an hour later. After transferring to Wilanów, Wojciechowski and Witos negotiated with the commanders of troops loyal to the cabinet. The military decided they should move to Poznań and maintain the armed struggle from beyond. Eventually, to prevent the Warsaw fighting from turning into a country-wide civil war, both Wojciechowski and Witos decided to resign and issued an order to their troops to cease fratricidal fighting. A new government was formed under Prime Minister Kazimierz Bartel, with Piłsudski as the new Minister of Military Affairs. On 31 May 1926, the National Assembly nominated Piłsudski to be president, but he declined. Eventually Ignacy Mościcki became the new president; Piłsudski, however, wielded much greater de facto power than his military ministry nominally gave him.

== Later life ==
=== Scientific career ===
Following the resignation, Wojciechowski worked as a lecturer at the Warsaw School of Economics and the College of Agriculture in Warsaw. Wojciechowski served as the Director of the Cooperative Scientific Institute and later sat on the Scientific Council of the Institute. He published hermetic publications on cooperative activity, which he engaged in before he became an active politician. He wrote books such as the Organisation of Agricultural Products Sales and the History of Polish Cooperatives until 1914. In 1937, he was the co-founder of the opposition Labor Party.

=== Second World War ===
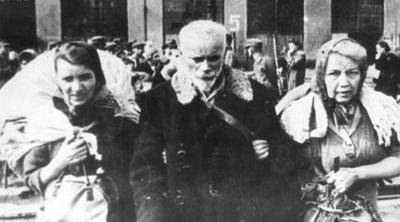
Wojciechowski with his wife Maria Kiersnowska (right) after being expelled from Warsaw at the end of the Warsaw Uprising (October 1944)

On 10 November 1939, the Gestapo arrested Wojciehowski's son, Edmund, as part of German AB-Aktion in Poland, and threatened with execution, as were other representatives of the Polish intelligentsia. Edmund was later released on 4 April 1940 because of Jerzy Antoni Potocki. He was later arrested again on 12 July 1940 because he was one of the 70 Warsaw lawyers who refused to remove Jewish associates from the Warsaw Bar Council. The Germans offered his release in exchange for Wojciechowski signing a declaration stating that the Polish government-in-exile was constitutionally illegal. Wojciechowski refused to sign the declaration and Edmund was transferred on 15 August 1940 to Auschwitz as one of the 1666 people of the first transport from Warsaw, where he soon died of typhus on 23 February 1941. The family received a telegram sent from the concentration camp informing Wojciechowski about his son's passing, and soon an urn of ashes containing the remains of Edmund was sent back to his parents. During the Warsaw Uprising, the ill Wojciechowski, along with his wife Maria, was rounded up by the Nazis and sent to Durchgangslager 121, a transit camp in Pruszków. Thanks to the efforts of the Polish sanitary staff, the German medical commission managed to release the former President from the camp.

=== Death ===
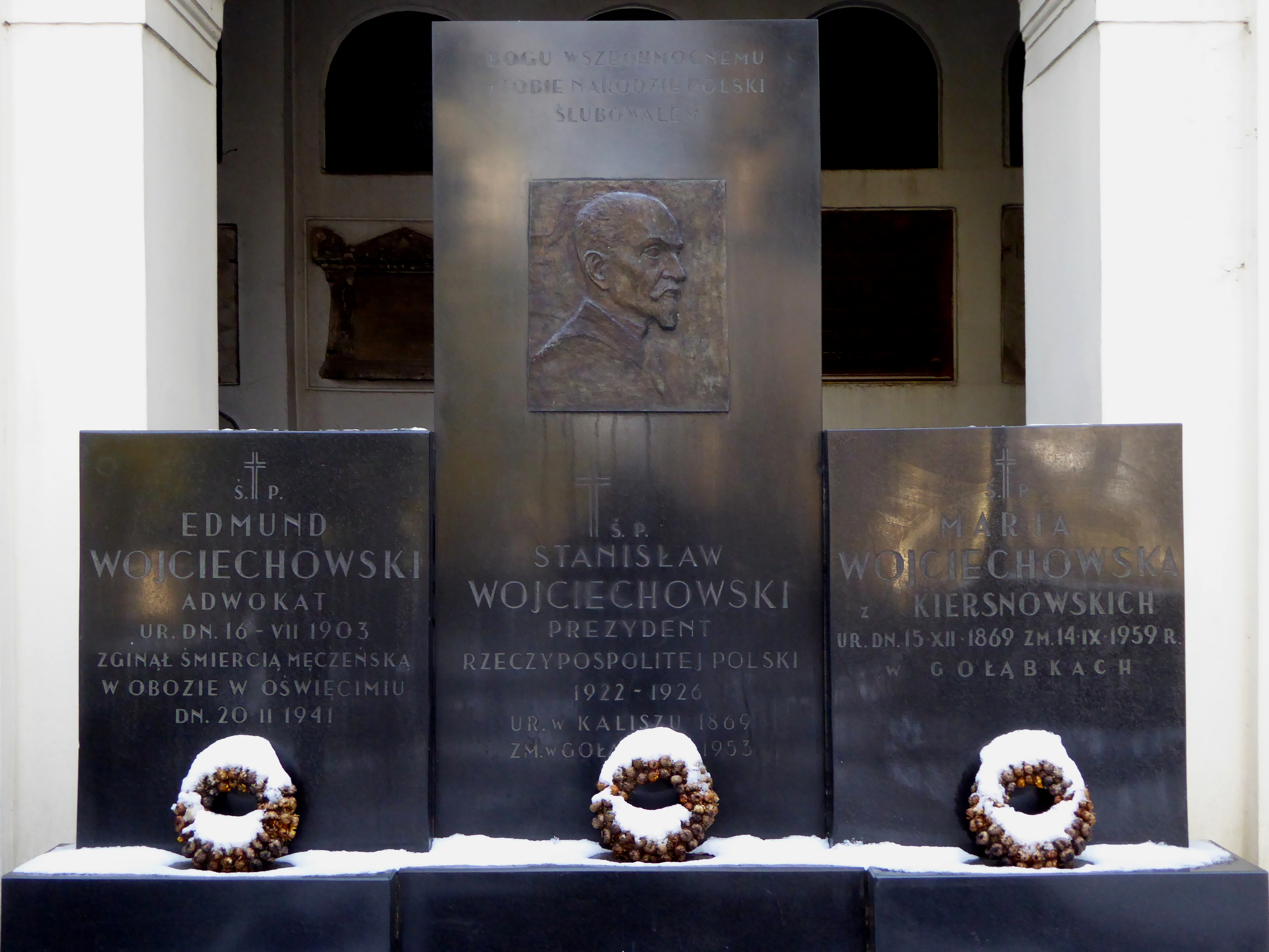
The grave of Stanisław Wojciechowski, his wife and son in Powązki cemetery

After the war, Wojciechowski retired to private life and died in Gołąbki (now Ursus) in 1953, at the age of 84. He was buried at the Powązki Cemetery in Warsaw.

== Legacy ==
Wojciechowski experienced a political life similar to that of many Central European politicians during the early 20th century. A radical in his youth, his ideology matured and grew more conservative with age. He was at the forefront of over a quarter-century of Polish political development and is considered one of the founders of the modern independent Polish state. Historians unanimously indicate that Wojciechowski remains a figure greatly underrated and believe that it should be remembered that his presidency fell on a particularly turbulent period in Polish history. He managed to make history as an outstanding politician and statesman and is remembered as a relentless defender of democratic values and a prominent patriot.

== See also ==
- List of presidents of Poland
- Polish Socialist Party

== Bibliography ==
- Polish President: a Co-operator The Co-operative League of USA Co-operation IX 1923: 67.
