= Gabriel Narutowicz =

President of Poland in 1922

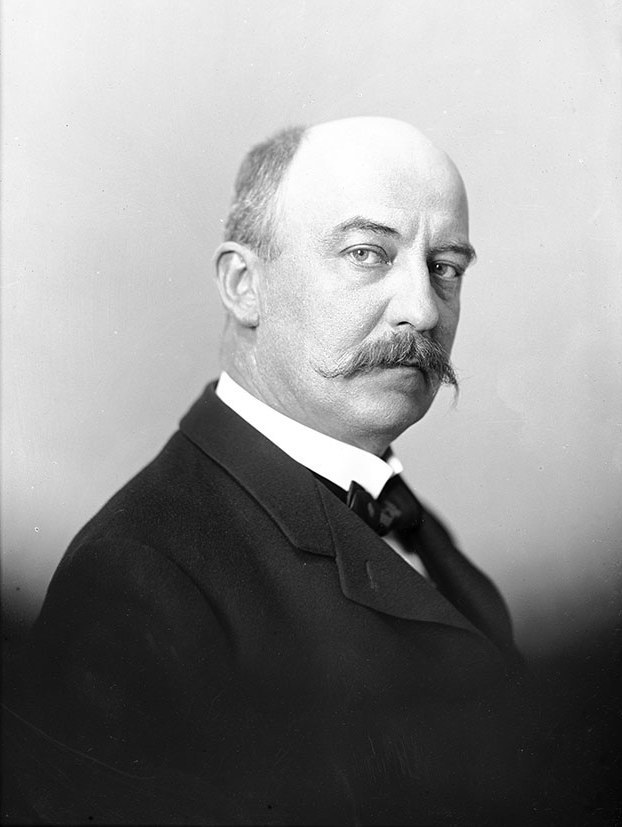
- Narutowicz in 1915

1st President of Poland
- In office 11 December 1922 – 16 December 1922
- Prime Minister: Julian Nowak
- Preceded by: Józef Piłsudski (as Chief of State)
- Succeeded by: Stanisław Wojciechowski; Maciej Rataj (acting)

Minister of Foreign Affairs
- In office 28 June 1922 – 14 December 1922
- Prime Minister: Artur Śliwiński; Julian Nowak
- Preceded by: Konstanty Skirmunt
- Succeeded by: Aleksander Skrzyński

Minister of Public Works
- In office 28 June 1920 – 6 June 1922
- Prime Minister: Władysław Grabski; Wincenty Witos; Antoni Ponikowski
- Preceded by: Andrzej Kędzior
- Succeeded by: Władysław Ziemiński

Personal details
- Born: Gabriel Józef Narutowicz; 29 March 1865 Telšiai, Russian Empire (now Lithuania)
- Died: 16 December 1922 (aged 57) Warsaw, Poland
- Cause of death: Assassination
- Party: Independent (supported by the Polish People's Party "Wyzwolenie")
- Spouse: Ewa Krzyżanowska
- Children: 2
- Education: ETH Zurich
- Profession: Diplomat; engineer; politician; statesman

Gabriel Józef Narutowicz (Polish: [ˈɡabrjɛl naruˈtɔvit͡ʂ]; 29 March 1865 – 16 December 1922) was a Polish engineer and politician who served as the first president of Poland from 11 December 1922 until his assassination five days after assuming office. He previously served as the minister of public works from 1920 to 1922 and briefly as the minister of foreign affairs in 1922. A non-partisan and an engineer by profession, Narutowicz was the first elected head of state following Poland's regained sovereignty from partitioning powers.

Born into a noble family with a strong patriotic sentiment, Narutowicz studied at the Saint Petersburg Imperial University before relocating to Zurich Polytechnic and completing his studies in Switzerland. An engineer by profession, he was a pioneer of electrification and his works were presented at exhibitions across Western Europe. Narutowicz also directed the construction of the first European hydroelectric power plants in Monthey, Mühleberg and Andelsbuch. In 1907, he was nominated a professor of hydroelectric and water engineering in Zurich, and was subsequently assigned to maintain the Rhine. In September 1919, Narutowicz was invited by the Polish authorities to work on reconstruction projects in the aftermath of World War I. In June 1920, Narutowicz became the minister of public works in Władysław Grabski's government. Following his successful conduct of the Polish delegation at the Genoa Conference, he became the minister of foreign affairs in Artur Śliwiński's cabinet.

During the 1922 presidential election, Narutowicz was supported by a centre-left coalition of the Polish People's Party "Wyzwolenie", Socialist Party, and Bloc of National Minorities, but was opposed by the conservative National Democrats. After five rounds of voting, Narutowicz defeated the National Democratic candidate, Maurycy Zamoyski, becoming the first president of Poland. After only five days in office, he was assassinated by a mentally disturbed artist, Eligiusz Niewiadomski, while viewing paintings at the Zachęta Art Gallery. His funeral was attended by almost 500,000 people.

== Early life and family ==
Gabriel Józef Narutowicz was born into a Polish-Lithuanian noble family in Telšiai, then part of the Russian Empire after the partitioning of the Polish–Lithuanian Commonwealth. His father, Jan Narutowicz, was a local district judge and landholder in the Samogitian village of Brėvikiai. As a result of his participation in the January 1863 Uprising against Imperial Russia, he was sentenced to a year in prison; he died when Gabriel was only one.

Gabriel's mother, Wiktoria Szczepkowska, was Jan's third wife. Following her husband's death, she raised the sons herself. An educated woman, intrigued by the philosophy of the Age of Enlightenment, she had a great influence on the development of Gabriel and his siblings' world view. In 1873, she moved to Liepāja, Latvia, so that her children would not be forced to attend a Russian school (Russification in Latvia after the Uprising of 1863 was less enforced than in Lithuania and Poland, the center of the uprising).

After Lithuania regained independence in 1918, Gabriel Narutowicz's brother, Stanisław Narutowicz, became a Lithuanian citizen and not a Polish citizen. Earlier, towards the end of World War I, Stanisław had become a member of the Council of Lithuania, the provisional Lithuanian parliament. He was a signatory of the Act of Independence of Lithuania of 16 February 1918.

== 1865–1920 ==
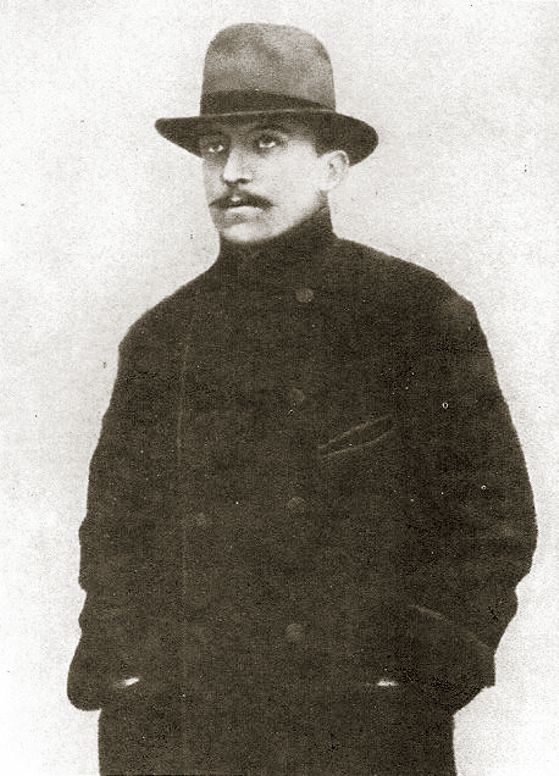
Narutowicz as a student of Zurich Polytechnic

Narutowicz finished his secondary education at the Liepāja Gymnasium, Latvia. He then enrolled at the Saint Petersburg Imperial University, in the Faculty of Physics and Mathematics. Illness, however, caused him to suspend those studies and to later transfer to the Zurich Polytechnic in Switzerland, where he studied from 1887 to 1891.

Narutowicz helped exiled Poles on the run from the Russian authorities during his time in Switzerland. He was also connected with a Polish émigré socialist party, "Proletariat". As a result of his associations, he was banned from returning to Russia and had a warrant issued for his arrest. In 1895, Narutowicz became a Swiss citizen and, after completing his studies, he was employed as an engineer during the construction of the St. Gallen railway.

Narutowicz proved to be an outstanding engineering expert and, in 1895, became chief of works on the River Rhine. Later, he was hired by the Kurstein technical office. His works were exhibited at the International Exhibition in Paris (1896), and he would become a famous pioneer of electrification in Switzerland. Narutowicz directed the construction of many other European hydroelectric power plants, such as in Monthey, Mühleberg, and Andelsbuch.

In 1907, he became a professor at ETH Zurich, in the water construction institute in Zurich. He was dean of that institute from 1913 to 1919. He was also a member of the Swiss Committee for Water Economy. In 1915, he was chosen chairman of the International Committee for the regulation of the River Rhine.

During World War I, he cooperated with the General Swiss Committee tasked with helping victims of the war in Poland and was also a member of La Pologne et la Guerre, located in Lausanne. A follower of the ideas of Józef Piłsudski, Narutowicz was invited in September 1919 by the Polish government to return to Poland to take part in the rebuilding of the nation's infrastructure.

== 1920–1922 ==
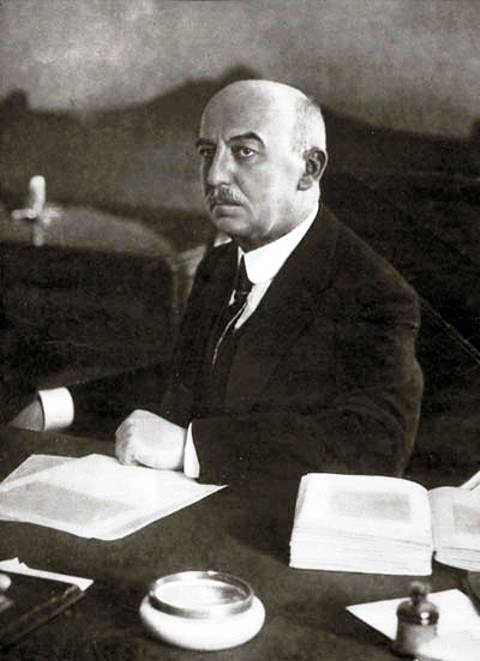
Narutowicz in his office, just days before the assassination

After coming back to Poland, on 23 June 1920 Narutowicz became the Minister of Public Works in Władysław Grabski's government. He held that post until 26 June 1922 (in four different subsequent cabinets: of Władysław Grabski, Wincenty Witos and the first and the second governments of Antoni Ponikowski). After becoming Minister of Public Works, Narutowicz immediately began working on rebuilding his country, utilising the experience he had acquired in Switzerland as a pioneer of electrification. He would soon go about reorganising the reconstruction bureaucracy and reduce the number of employees fourfold over the course of two years, in that way greatly increasing its efficiency.

Narutowicz traveled around the country often to personally supervise and direct public works. By 1921, almost 270,000 buildings and 300 bridges had been rebuilt, most of the roads mended, and about 200 km of highways added. He also designed dams and supervised the building of a hydroelectric power plant in Porąbka on the river Soła in the Beskid Mountains, and worked on irrigation control of the Vistula River.

Politically, he had a reputation as a moderate, reasonable and broad-minded man. He was a member of the government in every subsequent cabinet (a period of constant government crises and turnover). In April 1922, Narutowicz was delegated (together with the Minister of Foreign Affairs of the time, Konstanty Skirmunt) to participate in the Genoa Conference, and was given credit for the success of the Polish delegation — many Western diplomats had greater trust in the highly respected Narutowicz than in the other government ministers of the newly re-established country.

On 28 June 1922, he became the Minister of Foreign Affairs in Artur Śliwiński’s government. He also held that post in the later government of Julian Ignacy Nowak. In October 1922, he represented Poland at a conference in Tallinn. In the election of 1922, he supported the center-right National Public Union (Unia Narodowo-Państwowa), connected with Józef Piłsudski. He himself was a candidate of the Public Union on Eastern Borderlands (Państwowe Zjednoczenie na Kresach) but did not gain a seat in Parliament.

== Elections ==
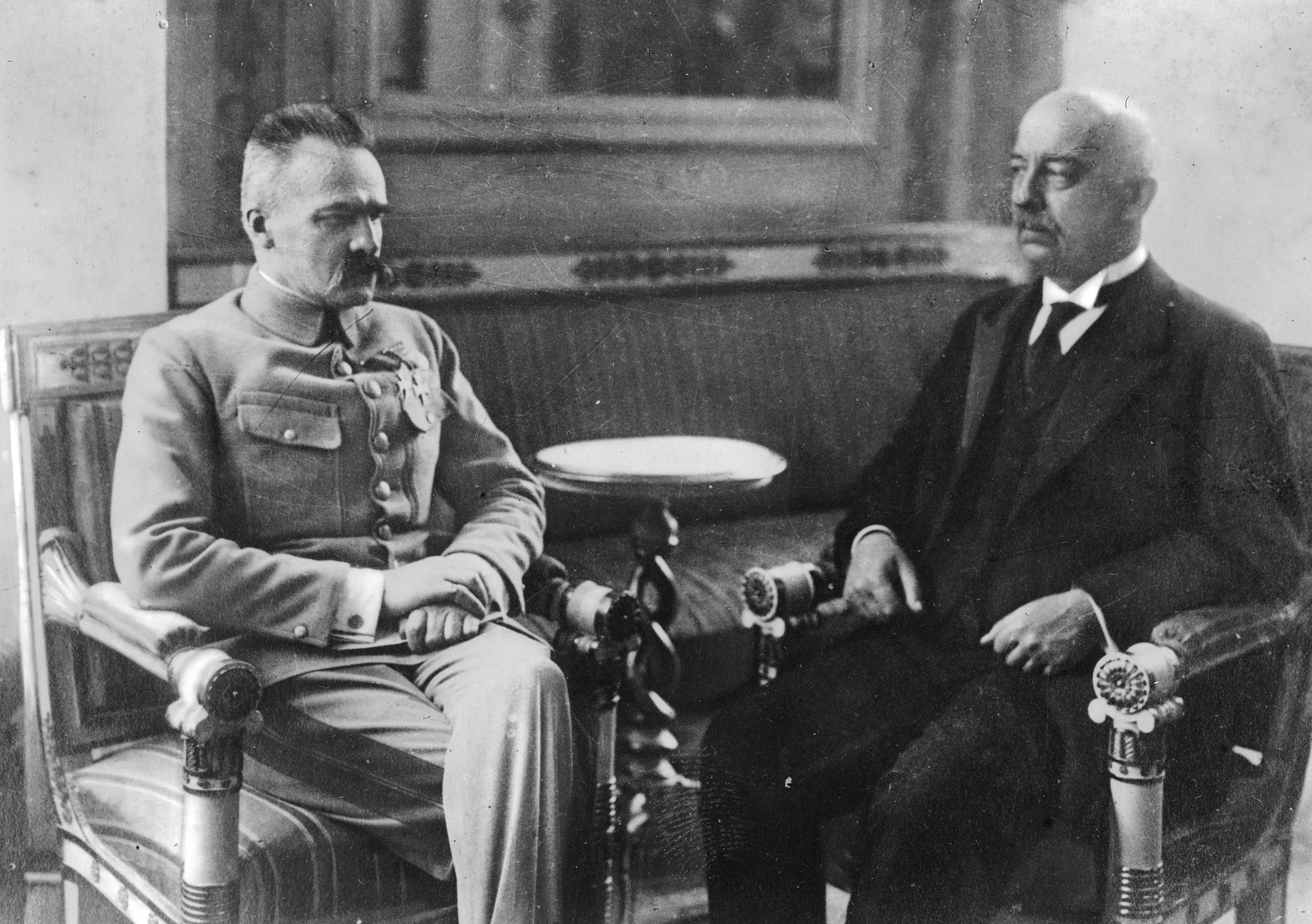
Narutowicz with Marshal Józef Piłsudski in Warsaw, 1922

After having lost the elections, Narutowicz continued as Minister of Foreign Affairs in the government of Julian Nowak. To his own great surprise, that December, he was nominated as a candidate for the ensuing presidential election. Although Piłsudski tried to discourage him from becoming a presidential candidate (he himself had originally wanted to decline the nomination, which the Polish People's Party "Wyzwolenie" had proposed), he eventually relented and accepted.

According to the March Constitution of Poland, the president had to be chosen by the National Assembly, that is, the two houses of parliament (Pol: Zgromadzenie Narodowe, i.e., the Sejm and the Senate). There was no clear winner after the first round of voting. In the second round, the official socialist candidate, Ignacy Daszyński, was eliminated, but again, there was no clear victor. The next to drop out were the two candidates most favored by representatives of the national minorities: namely, Jan Baudouin de Courtenay and Stanisław Wojciechowski (the latter supported by some of the Left). In the last and decisive round, only two candidates remained: Count Maurycy Klemens Zamoyski (backed by the right-wing National Democracy movement) and Narutowicz (supported by some center and left-wing parties as well as by spokesmen for various national minorities).

Narutowicz prevailed thanks to the votes of the left, of the representatives for national minorities vote (these representatives were determined to defeat the National Democracy movement), and of the centrist Polish People's Party "Piast" (PSL "Piast"). This last group, initially inclined toward Zamoyski, unexpectedly switched its backing to Narutowicz instead. Eventually, Narutowicz won 289 votes, whereas Zamoyski won only 227 votes, and so Narutowicz was elected the first president of the Second Polish Republic.

Narutowicz's victory came as an extremely unpleasant surprise to various leading right-wingers. Following the election, certain Catholic and nationalist groups began an aggressive campaign against Narutowicz personally. Among other accusations, they called him an atheist and a Freemason, and some of the press referred to him as "the Jewish president". The anti-Pilsudski faction, supported by General Józef Haller, also criticised the new president's overall support of Piłsudski's policies.

== Presidency ==
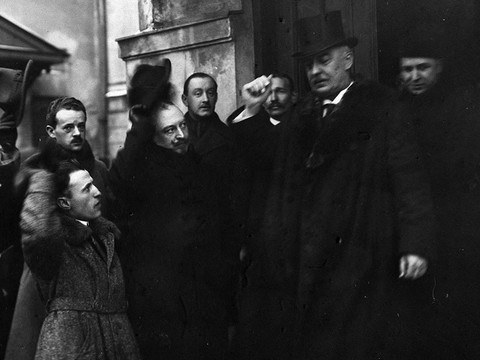
Narutowicz leaving the Polish Sejm after being proclaimed president, 11 December 1922

Narutowicz served as president of Poland for a mere five days. During his oath of office ceremony on 11 December 1922, members of the National Democracy and others manifested their opposition against the president-elect with anti-government demonstrations in Warsaw. Earlier on that day, opponents of his election attempted to prevent the president-elect from entering the Sejm by blocking the streets and throwing mud at his motorcade. Narutowicz was never comfortable with the widespread belief that he was a representative of the left-wing in Polish politics. He had only become the candidate of the Polish Peasant Party "Wyzwolenie" by happenstance; he had also not expected to win the election (in its first-round, Narutowicz gained just 62 votes, whereas Count Zamoyski had 222).

During his first days after taking the oath of office, Narutowicz met with the representatives of the Christian Democratic Party and Cardinal Aleksander Kakowski. Narutowicz realized that it would be impossible to form a majority government in the Parliament, so he made an attempt to create a government beyond the purview of Parliament. As a gesture to the right-wing, he offered the post of Minister of Foreign Affairs to his rival Zamoyski.

== Assassination ==
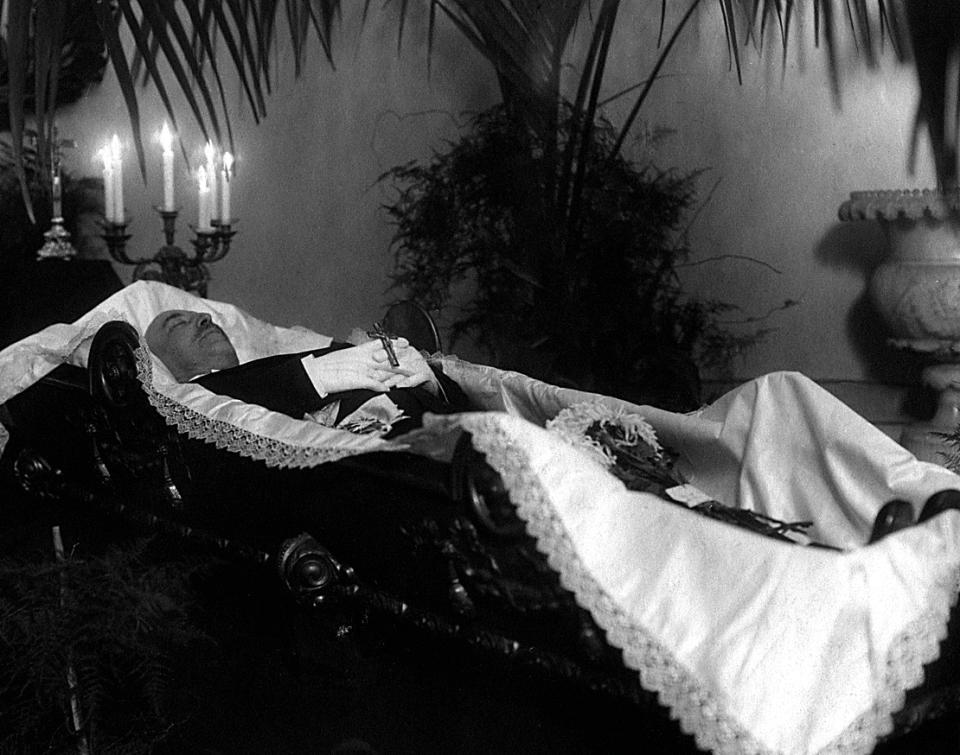
Narutowicz lying in state on a bier, 22 December 1922

Only five days after taking office, on 16 December 1922, Narutowicz was shot dead while attending an art exhibit in the Zachęta National Gallery of Art. The assassin was a painter, Eligiusz Niewiadomski, who had some connections with the right-wing party but became supportive of Piłsudski since 1905.

=== Trial ===
Niewiadomski was sentenced to death in a one-day trial and executed outside the Warsaw Citadel on 31 January.

=== Funeral ===
Nearly 500,000 people attended Narutowicz's funeral. His funeral was simultaneously seen as a manifestation of peace, which diminished the power of the far-right movement in the upcoming years. He was buried with honors on 22 December 1922 in the vault of St. John's Cathedral in Warsaw.

=== In film ===
The murder of Narutowicz was the main theme of the 1977 Polish feature film Death of a President (Pol: Śmierć prezydenta), directed by Jerzy Kawalerowicz. Narutowicz was played by Zdzisław Mrożewski.

== See also ==
- List of assassinations in Europe
- List of heads of state of Poland

Political offices
Preceded by Konstanty Skirmunt	Minister of Foreign Affairs; 1922	Succeeded by Aleksander Skrzyński
Preceded by Józef Piłsudski (Head of State)	President of the Republic of Poland; 1922	Succeeded by Maciej Rataj (Acting)
