= 1922 Polish presidential elections =

- 9 December election
- 9 December 1922
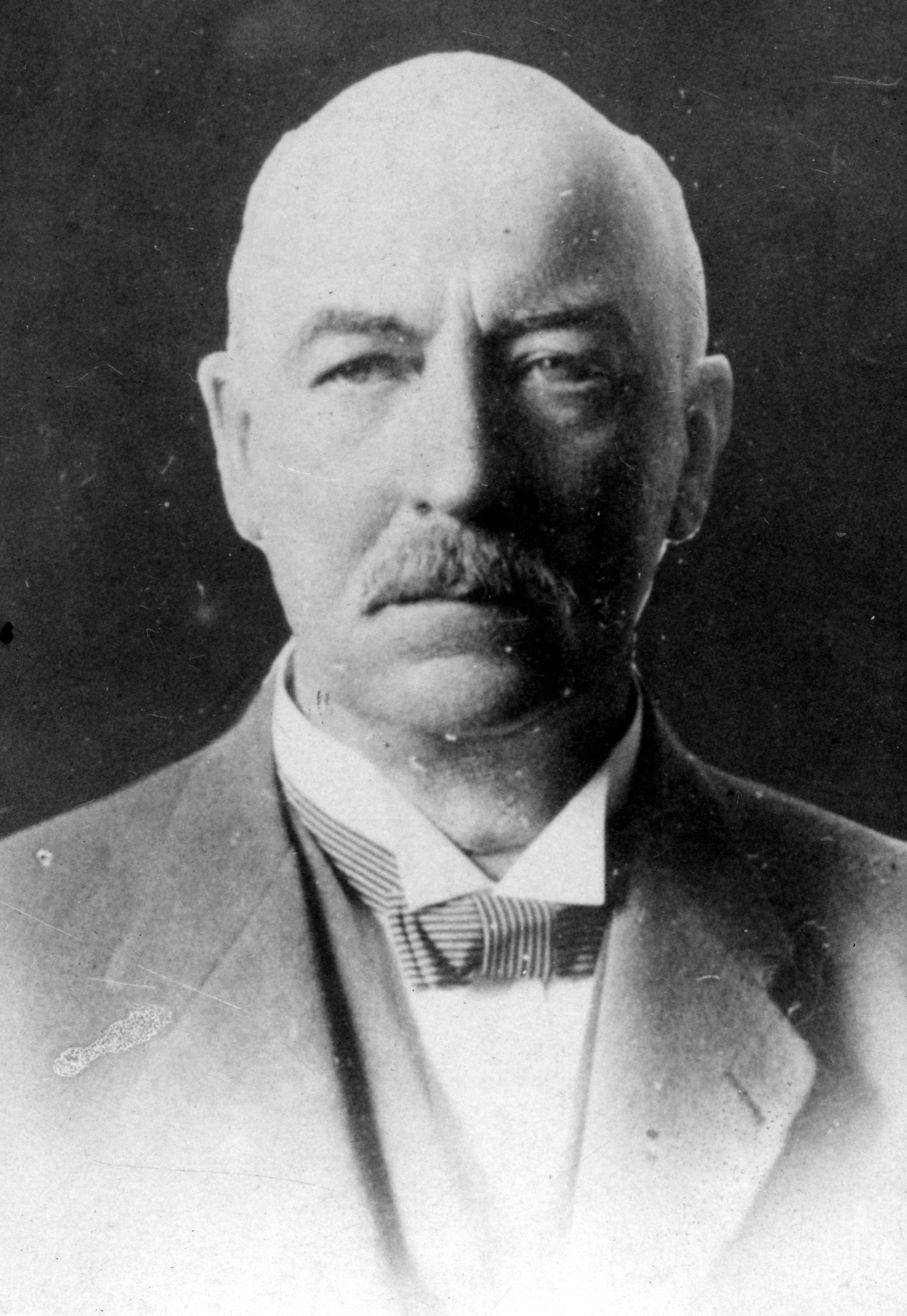

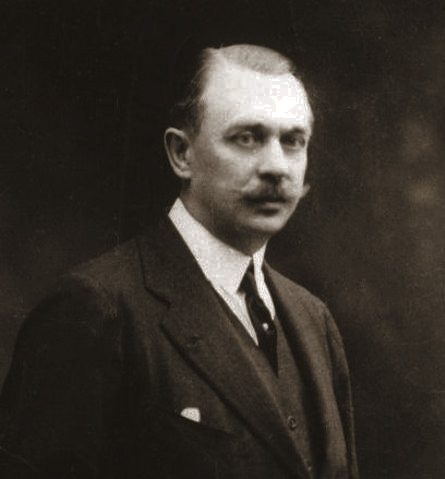
Nominee	Gabriel Narutowicz	Maurycy Zamoyski
Party	PSL "Wyzwolenie"	ZLN
Popular vote	289	227
Percentage	56.01%	43.99%
Chief of State before election
Józef Piłsudski
Independent
Elected President
Gabriel Narutowicz
Independent
- 22 December election
- 22 December 1922
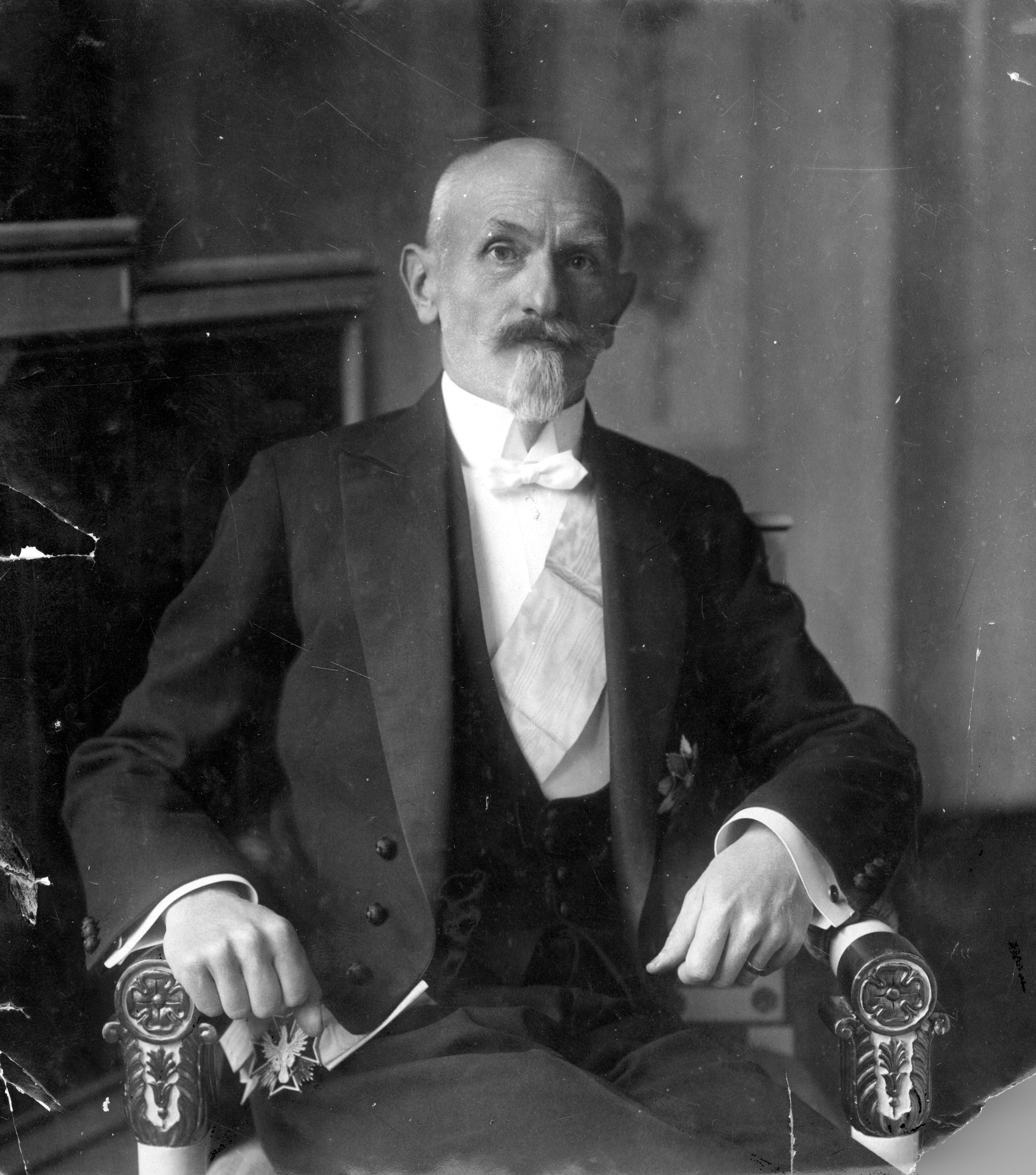

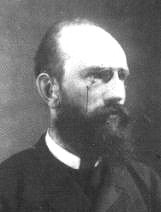
Nominee	Stanisław Wojciechowski	Kazimierz Morawski
Party	PSL "Piast"	ZLN
Popular vote	298	221
Percentage	57.42%	42.58%
President before election
Maciej Rataj (acting)
PSL
Elected President
Stanisław Wojciechowski
PSL

Two indirect presidential elections were held in Poland in December 1922. In the first election on 9 December Gabriel Narutowicz was elected president, but he was assassinated five days later. A second election on 22 December was won by Stanisław Wojciechowski.

== First election ==
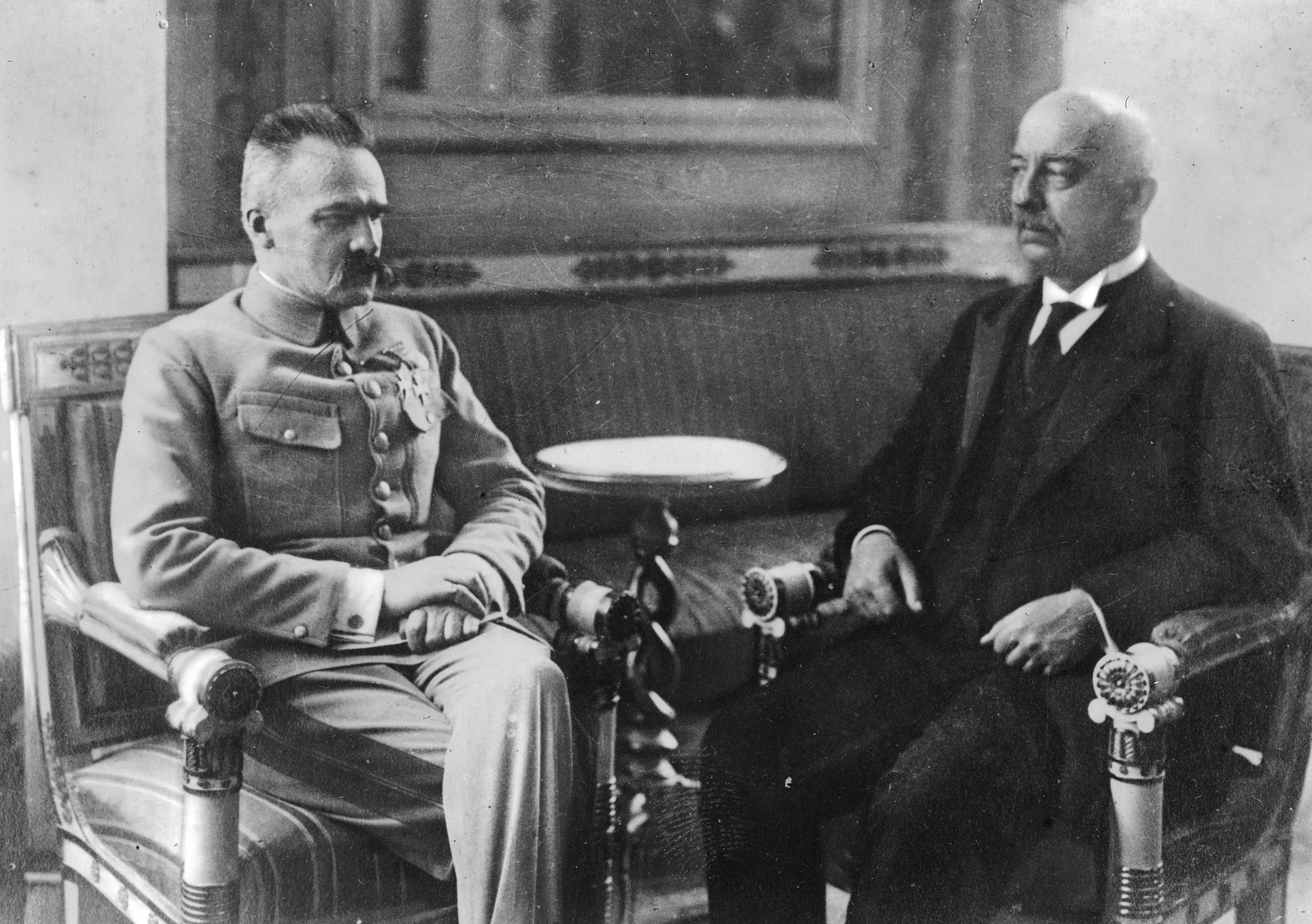
Piłsudski with president Narutowicz.

After the independence of Poland, the head of state was Naczelnik Państwa Józef Piłsudski. In a new constitution adopted by the Polish Sejm, the new head of state was to be the President of Republic of Poland - to be choose by the National Assembly (combined Sejm and Senate). After the parliamentary election, planning began for the first Polish presidential election in history.

The main probable candidate Józef Piłsudski, despite calls for him to contend, did not run for election. He proposed a former Prime Minister, Wincenty Witos, for presidency. Witos also refused. Finally Piłsudski supported the candidature of Minister of Foreign Affairs Gabriel Narutowicz.

At the time of the election the main candidates were count Maurycy Zamoyski, the candidate of National Democracy and Stanisław Wojciechowski, candidate of Polish People's Party "Piast". Narutowicz's good result was a surprise. Once the long voting was over, Zamoyski and Narutowicz advanced to the fifth ballot. Narutowicz finally won the election with the support of "Piast" (Wojciechowski was eliminated on the fourth round).

Narutowicz was sworn in as president on 11 December 1922, but was assassinated five days later.

=== Candidates ===
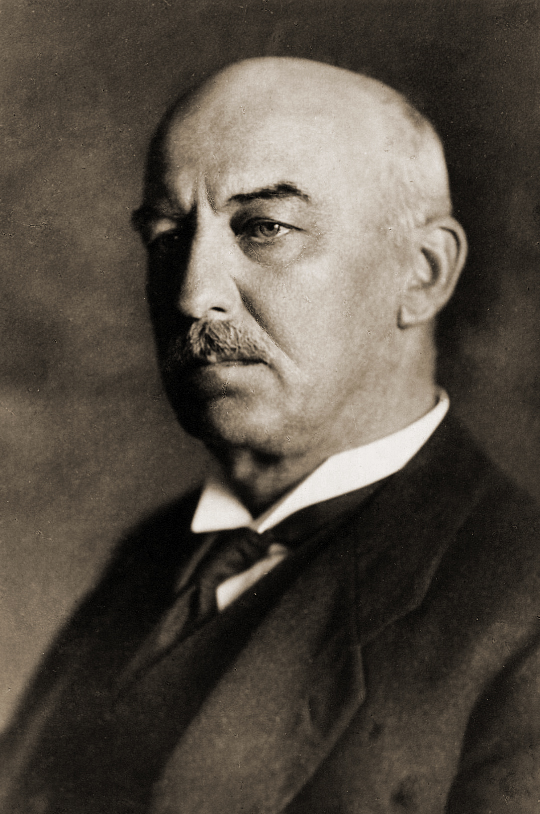
Minister of Foreign Affairs Gabriel Narutowicz

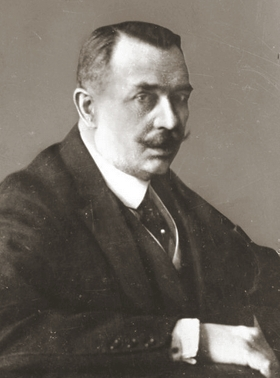
Diplomat Maurycy Zamoyski

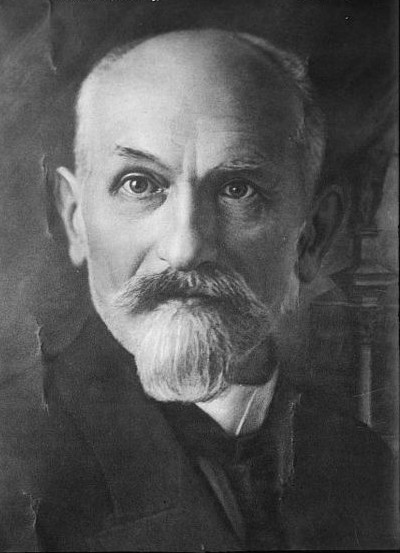
Former Minister of the Interior Stanisław Wojciechowski

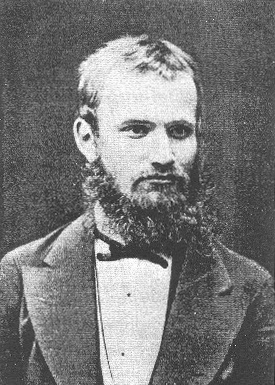
Linguist Jan Baudouin de Courtenay

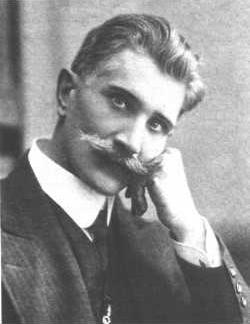
Former Prime Minister Ignacy Daszyński

=== Results ===
Candidate	Party	First round		Second round		Third round		Fourth round		Fifth round	
Candidate	Party	Votes	%	Votes	%	Votes	%	Votes	%	Votes	%
Maurycy Klemens Zamoyski	Popular National Union	222	41.04	228	41.99	228	42.14	224	41.48	227	43.99
Stanisław Wojciechowski	Polish People's Party "Piast"	105	19.41	153	28.18	150	27.73	145	26.85		
Jan Baudouin de Courtenay	National minorities	103	19.04	10	1.84	5	0.92				
Gabriel Narutowicz	Polish People's Party "Wyzwolenie"	62	11.46	151	27.81	158	29.21	171	31.67	289	56.01
Ignacy Daszyński	Polish Socialist Party	49	9.06	1	0.18						
Total		541	100.00	543	100.00	541	100.00	540	100.00	516	100.00
Source: Urbankowski

== Second election ==
The first election, when President of the Republic of Poland Gabriel Narutowicz was elected after several rounds by joint chambers of Sejm and Senate (at time of Second Polish Republic joint parliament elected president. The first direct vote took place in 1990). Narutowicz, however, was assassinated just five days since taking office. According to the Constitution the Sejm Marshal Maciej Rataj became Acting President of the Republic of Poland and organised new elections, which took place on 20 December. Stanislaw Wojciechowski won the second election, and took office on 22 December.

=== Candidates ===
- Kazimierz Morawski (put on ballot by National Democracy; supporter by allied right-wing parties), philologist and academician from Jagiellonian University
- Stanisław Wojciechowski (put on ballot by Polish People's Party "Wyzwolenie"; supported also by Polish Socialist Party, agrarians and minorities), former Minister of Interior and one of the leading candidates in previous election

=== Results ===
Candidate	Party	Votes	%
Stanisław Wojciechowski	Polish People's Party "Wyzwolenie"	298	57.42
Kazimierz Morawski	Popular National Union	221	42.58
Total		519	100.00
Total votes		519	–
Registered voters/turnout		555	93.51

== See also ==
- List of Polish presidents
- Józef Piłsudski
- Gabriel Narutowicz
- Andrzej Duda

== Bibliography ==
- Sławomir Koper, Józef Piłsudski. Człowiek i polityk, Warsaw 2011
- Dodatek nadzwyczajny, "Kurjer Poznański", 9 December 1922, Poznań.
