= Polish National Committee (1917–1919) =

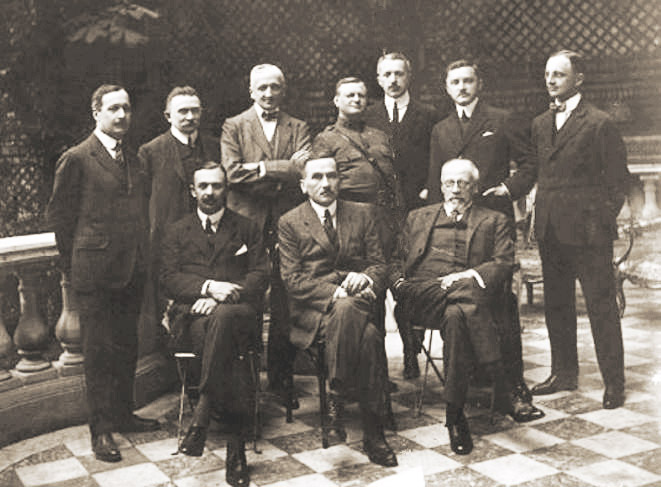
Polish National Committee in Paris, 1918. Sitting: Maurycy Zamoyski, Roman Dmowski, Erazm Piltz, standing: Stanisław Kozicki, Jan Emanuel Rozwadowski, Konstanty Skirmunt, Franciszek Fronczak, Władysław Sobański, Marian Seyda, Józef Wielowieyski

Polish National Committee (Polish: Komitet Narodowy Polski) was a political organization representing Polish interests during the World War I. It was formed in Lausanne on 15 August 1917 by Polish National Democracy politician Roman Dmowski. and was first recognized by the French as the legitimate representative of Poland in September 1917. The British and the Americans were less enthusiastic, but likewise recognized it in 1918.

Its aim was to create a Polish Army (the Blue Army under Józef Haller) to fight alongside the Allies of World War I, in exchange for their support for an independent Poland. In addition to Dmowski its chief activists included Ignacy Jan Paderewski, August Zaleski, Erazm Piltz, Marian Seyda and Maurycy Zamoyski. In January 1919 the Committee recognized the government of Ignacy Jan Paderewski and dissolved itself.

== Historical background ==
During World War I, many Polish people were determined to regain national independence after 123 years of occupation by Austria, Russia and Prussia, following the partitions of Poland. Towards the end of the war, a number of Polish organizations were established both within the partitioned state, and across the world. This caused concern for the Kaiser of Germany and the King-Emperor of Austria Hungary. On November 5, 1916, they passed an act proposing the creation of a Kingdom of Poland which was meant as a puppet state of the German Empire under control of the Central Powers. This act is known as the Act of 5th November.

After its proclamation, different Polish political groups and organizations began to seek the support of Entente states in the hope rebuilding the Polish state. Nonetheless, before the February Revolution in Russia, the Polish Question was regarded by the Western Countries as Russia's internal matter, nonetheless, the occurrence of February Revolution rushed the course of events. Polish Army was created in France in order to oppose Germany’s projects for Polish volunteer troops. On 4 June 1917 the French president - Raymond Poincaré, signed a decree which created the Polish army in France. In August of 1917, the Polish National Committee was established. Three months later, Roman Dmowski’s Polish National Committee was acknowledged as an official authority by the Allies: by France in September, the United Kingdom and Italy in October, and the United States in December.

== See also ==
- Yugoslav Committee
- Czechoslovak National Council
