= Konstanty Skirmunt =

Polish politician

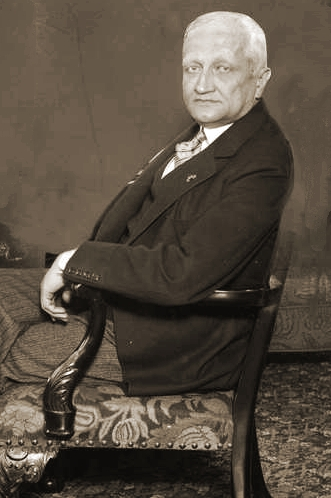
Konstanty Skirmunt

Konstanty Skirmunt (Russian: Константи́н Ге́нрихович Ски́рмунт) (30 August 1866 – 24 July 1949) was a Polish politician.

During 1907—1914 he was a member of the State Council of the Russian Empire. He was a member of the Polish National Committee in Paris in 1917–1918, Polish ambassador in Rome in 1919–1921, Polish Minister of Foreign Affairs in 1921–22, and Polish ambassador in London in 1919–1934.

== Decorations ==
- 1923: Order of Polonia Restituta of the 1st class ( Wielka wstęga orderu Odrodzenia Polski)
- 1926: Grand Cross of the Order of the White Lion (Czechoslovakia)
- 1932: Gold Cross of Merit
- 1936: Royal Victorian Order of the 1st class (Great Britain)
