= Denver Mint robbery =

1922 theft at the US Mint in Denver, Colorado

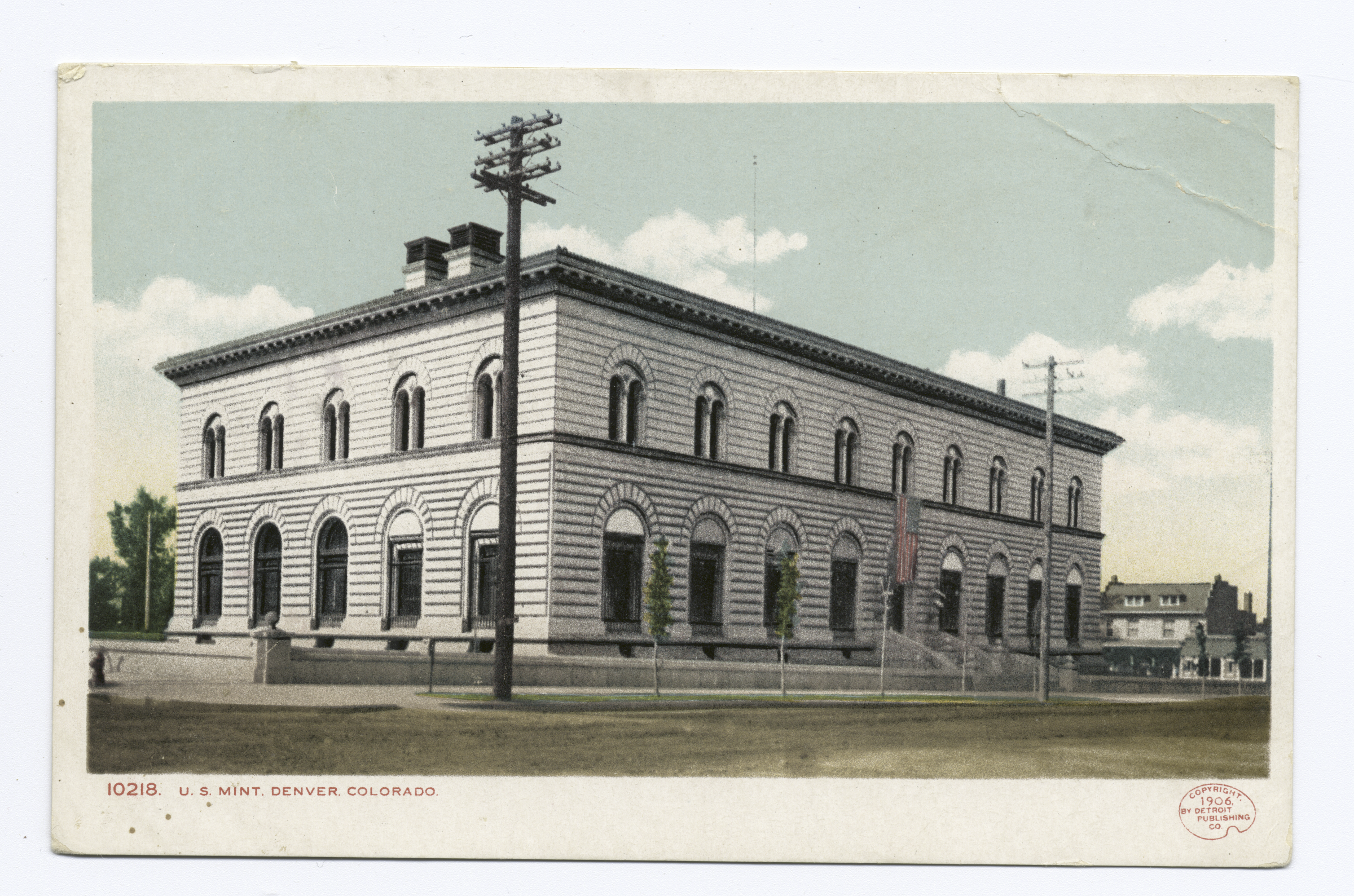
- U.S. Mint building in 1906
- Date: December 18, 1922
- Venue: Denver Mint
- Location: Denver, Colorado, U.S.
- Cause: Robbery
- Outcome: Theft of $200,000

On December 18, 1922, five men hijacked a Federal Reserve Bank delivery truck outside the U.S. Mint in Denver, Colorado.

== Robbery ==
At the time of the robbery, around 10:30 am, the truck was being loaded with $200,000 (in $5 bills) on West Colfax Avenue. A black Buick touring car then pulled up and two men jumped out firing sawed-off shotguns, while a third grabbed the money bags. U.S Mint Police Officers inside the mint, numbering some 50 men, quickly responded by returning fire. One of the robbers was said to have "taken a [shotgun] round in the jaw". The gang however, remaining at the scene for only a minute and a half, had already made their getaway.

== Suspects ==
None of the gunmen were ever identified, with the exception of 36-year-old Nicholas "Chaw Jimmie" Trainor who was killed during the shootout with the U.S Mint Police, and they successfully escaped with $200,000. The gang fled taking the mortally wounded Trainor with them after one of the guards, Charles Linton, was killed. Linton was an Arapahoe and Denver Deputy Sheriff before becoming a Guard at Denver's Federal Reserve. In 1882, Linton was involved in the arrest of Doc Holiday on a warrant from Arizona in Denver for the OK Corral Incident (1881). Doc never was taken to Arizona as friends and politics kept him safe in Colorado. IBSN:1-559 330-232-0. On January 14, 1923, Trainor's body was found in their getaway car after it had been dumped in a Gilpin Street garage in Denver. Police later suspected that Harvey Bailey, who had worked with Trainor in the past, may have been another member of the gang but were never able to produce any evidence of his involvement.

On February 17, a month after Trainor's body was discovered, Minnesota authorities raided an abandoned hideout and the Secret Service recovered $80,000 from the Denver Mint Robbery and $73,000 in bonds stolen from a bank robbery in Walnut Hills, Ohio three months prior to the mint robbery. Both Trainor and Bailey were suspects in the Walnut Hills robbery which further strengthened the police theory of Bailey's involvement. Bailey had disappeared in late-1922 and continued to elude authorities until his arrest and conviction in 1933. Bailey died in 1979.

The case remained unsolved for 12 years until Denver Police Chief A.T. Clark announced that the robbery team had been identified and included five men and two women, all of whom had since been killed in the years following the robbery. The two alleged surviving members, Harvey Bailey and James "Oklahoma Jack" Clark, had since been sentenced to life imprisonment on unrelated charges. The gang, police claimed, had fled to the Minneapolis-St. Paul area where the money was given to "a prominent Minneapolis attorney". No one was ever charged with the robbery and the case was officially closed on December 1, 1934.
