= Maciej Rataj =

Polish politician

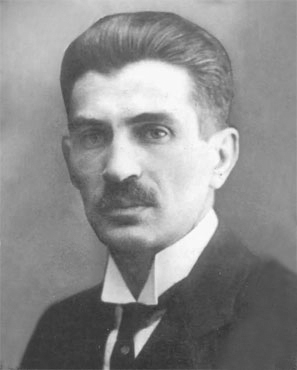
- Maciej Rataj

Acting President of Poland
- In office 15 May – 4 June 1926
- Prime Minister: Kazimierz Bartel
- Preceded by: Stanisław Wojciechowski
- Succeeded by: Ignacy Mościcki
- In office 16 December – 22 December 1922
- Prime Minister: Julian Nowak; Władysław Sikorski
- Preceded by: Gabriel Narutowicz
- Succeeded by: Stanisław Wojciechowski

2nd Marshal of the Sejm
- In office 23 November 1922 – 26 March 1928
- President: Józef Piłsudski (Chief of State); Gabriel Narutowicz; Himself (acting); Stanisław Wojciechowski; Himself (acting); Ignacy Mościcki
- Prime Minister: Julian Nowak; Władysław Sikorski; Wincenty Witos; Władysław Grabski; Aleksander Skrzyński; Wincenty Witos; Kazimierz Bartel; Józef Piłsudski
- Preceded by: Wojciech Trąmpczyński
- Succeeded by: Ignacy Daszyński

Personal details
- Born: 19 February 1884 Chłopy, near Lemberg, Austria-Hungary
- Died: 21 June 1940 (aged 56) Palmiry, General Government
- Resting place: Palmiry
- Party: Polish People's Party "Piast"
- Education: University of Lwów
- Occupation: Politician

Maciej Rataj (19 February 1884 – 21 June 1940) was a Polish politician, speaker of the Polish Parliament and deputy President of the Republic of Poland, and writer.

== Biography ==
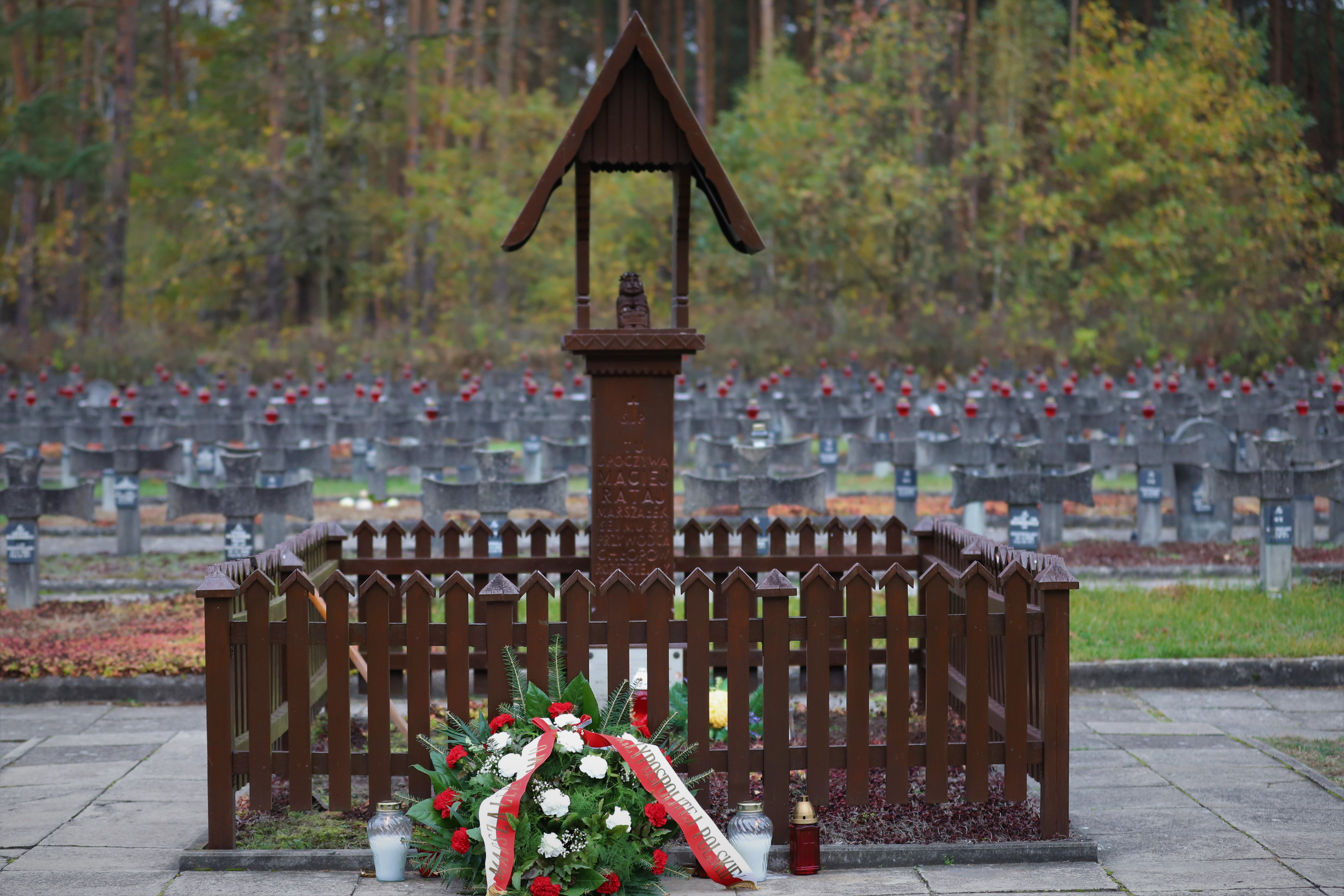
Rataj's grave

Born in the village of Chłopy, near Lwów (now Lviv, Ukraine), on 19 February 1884, he attended a gymnasium in Lwów and studied classical linguistics at the University of Lwów. Upon the completion of his studies, he became a gymnasium teacher first in Lwów, and later in Zamość. He became involved in politics after the Second Polish Republic gained independence following the First World War. He was a member of the Polish People's Party "Piast" political party, and, from 1931, a member of the People's Party. He became president of the Stronnictwo and the chief editor of the party's official paper, the "Zielony Sztandar" in 1935. From 1919 to 1930, and from 1934 to 1935, he was a member of parliament for the Sejm (Polish Parliament), and from 1922 to 1928 he was the Marshal of the Sejm. Between 1920 and 1921 he was the Minister of Religion and Public Education, and prior to this in 1919 he was deputy to the Constitutional Commission, which developed the March Constitution.

He was President of Poland twice: first in December 1922, as Acting President of the Republic of Poland for one week, after the assassination of president Gabriel Narutowicz and again in May 1926, following Józef Piłsudski's May Coup and the resignation of president Stanisław Wojciechowski. His second term lasted half a month. On both occasions, he oversaw special elections and appointed new governments. In December 1939 he was arrested by Nazi Germany and executed in Palmiry during the German AB-Aktion operation in Poland.

In 2018, at a ceremony held at the Royal Castle in Warsaw on the 100th anniversary of Poland regaining its independence, Polish President Andrzej Duda posthumously conferred the country's highest distinction, the Order of the White Eagle, upon 25 distinguished Poles including Rataj.

== Works ==
- Pamiętniki (Memoirs) (1965)
- Wskazania obywatelskie i polityczne: Wybór pism i przemówień z lat 1919–1938 (1987)
- Maciej Rataj o parlamentaryzmie, państwie demokratycznym i sanacji (1998)

Political offices
Preceded by Gabriel Narutowicz	President of Poland; Acting; 1922	Succeeded by Stanisław Wojciechowski
Preceded by Stanisław Wojciechowski	President of Poland; Acting; 1926	Succeeded by Ignacy Mościcki
