= Kazimierz Morawski (philologist) =

Polish classical philologist, historian, and translator (1852–1925)

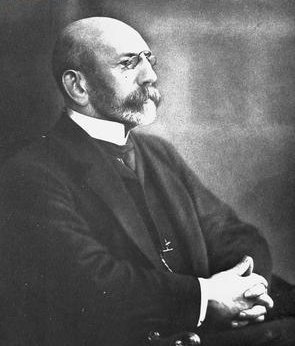
- Born: 29 January 1852; Jurkowo, Poland
- Died: 25 August 1925 (aged 73); Kraków, Poland
- Citizenship: Polish
- Occupations: philologist historian

Kazimierz Morawski (29 January 1852 – 25 August 1925) was a Polish classical philologist, historian, translator, professor and rector of Jagiellonian University, president of Polish Academy of Learning, and candidate for the President of Poland. He was awarded the Order of the White Eagle.

== Early life and education ==
Kazimierz was the son of Kajetan Morawski and Józefa Łempicka, older brother of Zdzisław, publicist and lawyer. He attended the Saint Mary Magdalene High School in Poznań, where among his teachers was Edward Likowski. From 1869 until 1874 he studied philology and history at Humboldt University of Berlin (where one of the lecturers was Theodor Mommsen), where he received his Ph.D.

== Career ==
He was then a teacher of Latin in one of Wrocław high schools. In 1878, after he received habilitation, Morawski started to work as a lecturer at the Jagiellonian University. Since 1880 he was a professor at the university, in 1887 he was promoted to full professor. Since 1887 he was also a full member of the Academy of Learning in Kraków. Between 1906 and 1907 he was a rector of the Jagiellonian University.

He was the vice-president of the Academy of Learning since 1917. In 1918, after Stanisław Tarnowski died, he was nominated for the president of the academy.

In the 1922 Polish presidential election he was an independent candidate supported by the National Party and other right-wing parties. He lost the election, receiving from members of the Polish parliament 77 votes less than Stanisław Wojciechowski, a PSL Piast politician.

== Honors and awards ==
Morawski was awarded with many high rank distinctions, including Order of the Iron Crown (3rd class), Order of the White Eagle and Légion d'honneur (commandeur).

== Death ==
He died in 1925 and was buried at the Rakowicki Cemetery in the family tomb.
