= Assassination of Gabriel Narutowicz =

1922 murder of Polish president in Warsaw

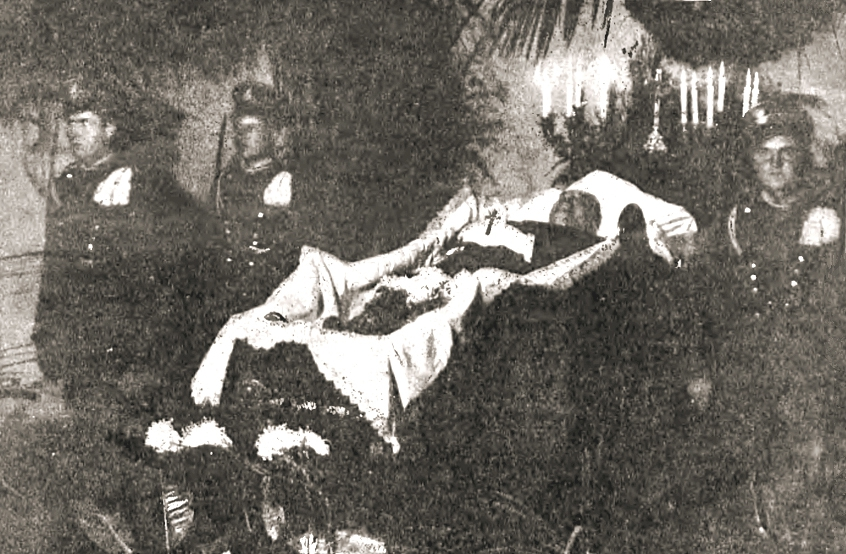
- Guard of honor at Narutowicz's funeral bier
- Date: 16 December 1922
- Location: Zachęta National Gallery of Art, Warsaw, Second Polish Republic; 52°14′21″N 21°0′42″E
- Motive: Anti-communism; Antisemitism; Polish nationalism
- Target: Gabriel Narutowicz, President of Poland
- Perpetrator: Eligiusz Niewiadomski
- Convictions: Murder
- Sentence: Death by firing squad

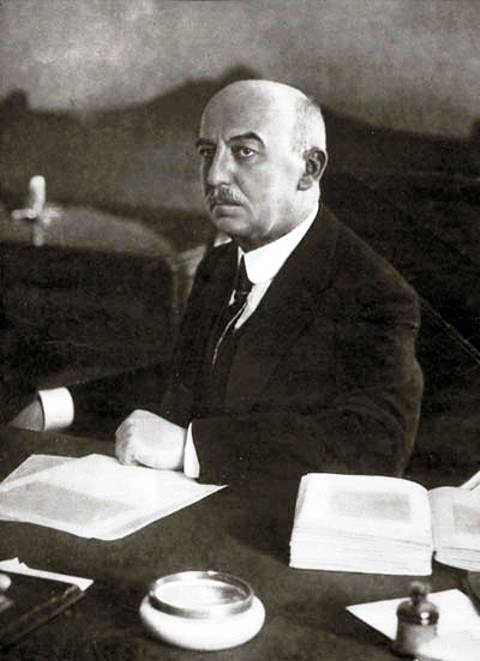
Narutowicz in 1922

Gabriel Narutowicz, the first president of Poland after regaining independence, was assassinated by a far-right Polish nationalist on 16 December 1922, five days after taking office, aged 57. He was fatally shot by Eligiusz Niewiadomski, an artist and art critic, while visiting an exhibition at Warsaw's Zachęta gallery.

== Background ==
Poland regained independence in 1918 in the aftermath of World War I. Following the 1921 March Constitution of Poland and the November 1922 legislative election, Gabriel Narutowicz was elected by the parliament to be the first president of Poland in the Polish presidential election, 9 December 1922. Narutowicz was a non-partisan professor of engineering whose candidacy had been put forward by the left and was also supported in the final round of voting by the centre-right Polish People's Party "Piast" and by national minorities. His election was not accepted by the right-wing National Democracy (Poland) (endecja) faction, which staged a number of protests. Narutowicz's murder five days after he took office would be the culmination of an aggressive, right-wing and anti-Semitic propaganda campaign vilifying him; in the background of street protests he was described, by a hostile press, as an atheist, a Freemason and a Jew.

== Assassination ==
Five days after taking office, while attending an art exhibition in the Warsaw's National Gallery of Art "Zachęta", Narutowicz was shot and killed during a conversation with a British envoy. The assassin was a painter, Eligiusz Niewiadomski, who fired three shots at the president.

== Aftermath ==
Niewiadomski had connections with the right wing National Democratic Party. During his trial, Niewiadomski stated that he wanted to kill Józef Piłsudski originally, but assassinating his ally, Narutowicz, was "a step in the fight for Polishness and for the nation." Niewiadomski was sentenced to death. His state execution took place outside the Warsaw Citadel on 31 January. Part of the right-wing camp perceived Niewiadomski as a hero. Nationalistic press and some historians kept portraying Niewiadomski in positive light, writing about his "heroic stand", "sacred convictions, "patriotic duty" and such. Within months, his grave became a right-wing shrine, and "more than three hundred babies baptized in Warsaw were given the uncommon name Eligiusz".

The murder of the first president of the Second Polish Republic and the angry canvassing against him revealed the fragility of democratic mechanisms in Poland at that time.

The murder of Narutowicz served as the inspiration and a main theme for a number of works. They include the 1977 Polish feature film Death of a President (Polish: Śmierć prezydenta), directed by Jerzy Kawalerowicz, and Wilhelm Sasnal's 2003 painting Narutowicz.

== See also ==
- Polish nationalism
