= Maurycy Klemens Zamoyski =

Polish nobleman (1871–1939)

- Count
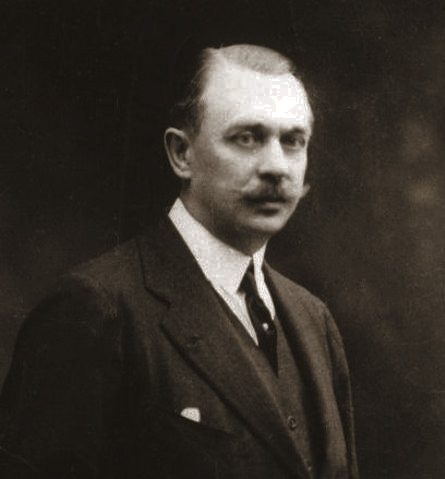
- Coat of arms: Jelita
- Born: 30 July 1871; Warsaw, Congress Poland, Russian Empire
- Died: 5 May 1939 (aged 67); Klemensów, Poland
- Family: Zamoyski
- Consort: Maria Róża Sapieha
- Issue: Maria Zamoyska; Zofia Zamoyska; Róża Zamoyska; Jan Zamoyski; Andrzej Zamoyski; Władysław Marek Zamoyski; Anna Zamoyska; Paweł Zamoyski; Teresa Zamoyska; Krystyna Zamoyska
- Father: Tomasz Franciszek Zamoyski
- Mother: Maria Potocka

Count Maurycy Klemens Zamoyski (Russian: Маври́кий Фоми́ч Замо́йский; 30 July 1871 – 5 May 1939) was a Polish nobleman (szlachcic), politician and social activist who served as the minster of foreign affairs in the Polish government of the 1920s.

== Life ==
Maurycy Zamoyski was the 15th Lord of the Zamość estate and the biggest land owner in pre-World War II Poland. He co-founded and chaired the Agricultural Society in 1903. In 1906, he was elected to the State Duma of the Russian Empire as a representative of Lublin Governorate. During the First World War he was the vice-chairman of the Polish National Committee in Warsaw and later vice-chairman of the Polish National Committee in Paris.

He campaigned in the 1922 presidential elections as a candidate of the right-wing supported by various political parties, most notably the National Democrats. He won four rounds of the election only to lose out in the final round to the surprise victor Gabriel Narutowicz, who was hence elected President of Poland until his death after assuming five days office. From 1919–1924 ambassador in Paris; from 19 January 1924 until 27 July 1924 Minister of Foreign Affairs.

== Personal life ==
He married Princess Maria Róża Sapieha on 18 July 1906 in Białka Szlachecka.

== Honours ==
- Grand Cordon of the Order of Polonia Restituta (Poland)
- Commander's Cross with Star of the Order of Polonia Restituta (Poland)
- Grand Officer of the Legion of Honour (France)
- Grand Cross of the Order of the Dannebrog (Denmark)
- Grand Cross of the Order of Orange-Nassau (Netherlands)
- Grand Cross of the Order of the Crown of Italy (Italy)

== See also ==
- Zamoyski family
- List of szlachta
