= Grabski =

Grabski (feminine: Grabska; plural: Grabscy) may refer to:

- Andrzej Feliks Grabski (1934–2000), Polish historian
- Józef Grabski (born 1950), Polish art historian
- Małgorzata Kidawa-Błońska, née Grabska (born 1957), Polish politician
- Stanisław Grabski (1871–1949), Polish economist and politician
- Władysław Grabski (1874–1938), Polish economist and Prime Minister
- Władysław Jan Grabski (1901–1970), Polish writer
- Zofia Kirkor-Kiedroniowa, née Grabska (1872–1952), Polish activist
- Zofia Wojciechowska-Grabska (1905–1992), Polish painter
