= Jan Kidawa-Błoński =

Polish film director, producer and screenwriter

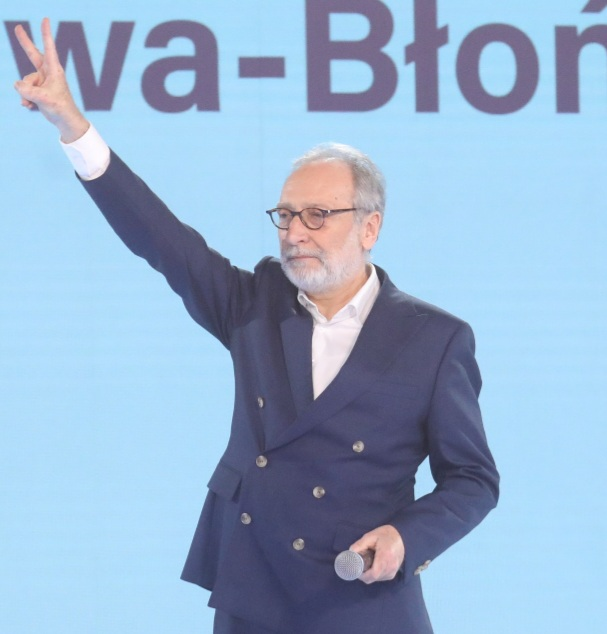
- Born: 12 February 1953 (age 73); Chorzów, Poland
- Education: National Film School in Łódź
- Occupations: Film director, producer, screenwriter
- Spouse: Małgorzata Grabska (m. 1983)
- Children: 1

Jan Kidawa-Błoński (born 12 February 1953) is a Polish film director, producer and screenwriter.

== Life ==
Kidawa-Błoński was born in Chorzów. He initially studied architecture at the Silesian University of Technology. In 1980, he graduated from the National Film School in Łódź where he studied filmmaking.

For his debut film, Trzy stopy nad ziemią ("Three Feet Above the Ground") he was awarded the Złote Grono Award at the Łagów Film Festival. Between 1982-1991, he was a member of the Silesia Film Studio. He served as head of the Polish Filmmakers Association from 1990 to 1994. He also sat on the board of the Independent Film and Television Producers Association in the years 1997-2001. In 2005, he directed an award-winning film Destined for Blues, which tells the story of his nephew Ryszard Riedel, lead singer of blues-rock band Dżem. In 2010, he won the Golden Lions Award at the 35th Gdynia Film Festival for his film Little Rose. In 2014, he became the recipient of the Silver Medal for Merit to Culture - Gloria Artis.

== Personal life ==
He married politician Małgorzata Kidawa-Błońska (née Grabska) with whom he has a son, Jan. In 2010 and 2015, he officially supported Bronisław Komorowski during the presidential elections campaign.

== Filmography ==
- Gwiazdy, (2017)
- W ukryciu, (2013)
- Ja to mam szczęście, TV series, (2012)
- Różyczka (Little Rose), (2010)
- Rajskie klimaty, TV series, (2009)
- Warto kochać, TV series (2006)
- Wiedźmy, TV series (2005)
- Skazany na bluesa, (Destined for Blues), (2005)
- Az Utolso Blues, producer, (2001)
- A mi Szerelmunk, producer, (1999)
- Wirus, (1996)
- Pamiętnik znaleziony w garbie, (1992)
- Męskie sprawy, (1988)
- Trzy stopy nad ziemią, (1984)

== See also ==
- Polish cinema
