= Adam Mickiewicz 8th Secondary School in Poznań =

Adam Mickiewicz High School
- VIII Liceum Ogólnokształcące im. Adama Mickiewicza w Poznaniu

Location
- ul. Cegielskiego 1, 61-862; Poznań; Poland
- Coordinates: 52.3929°N 16.8966°E

Information
- Type: Liceum
- Established: 1923
- Headmaster: Marek Grefling, Danuta Kin, Szymon Nowicki
- Enrollment: 677
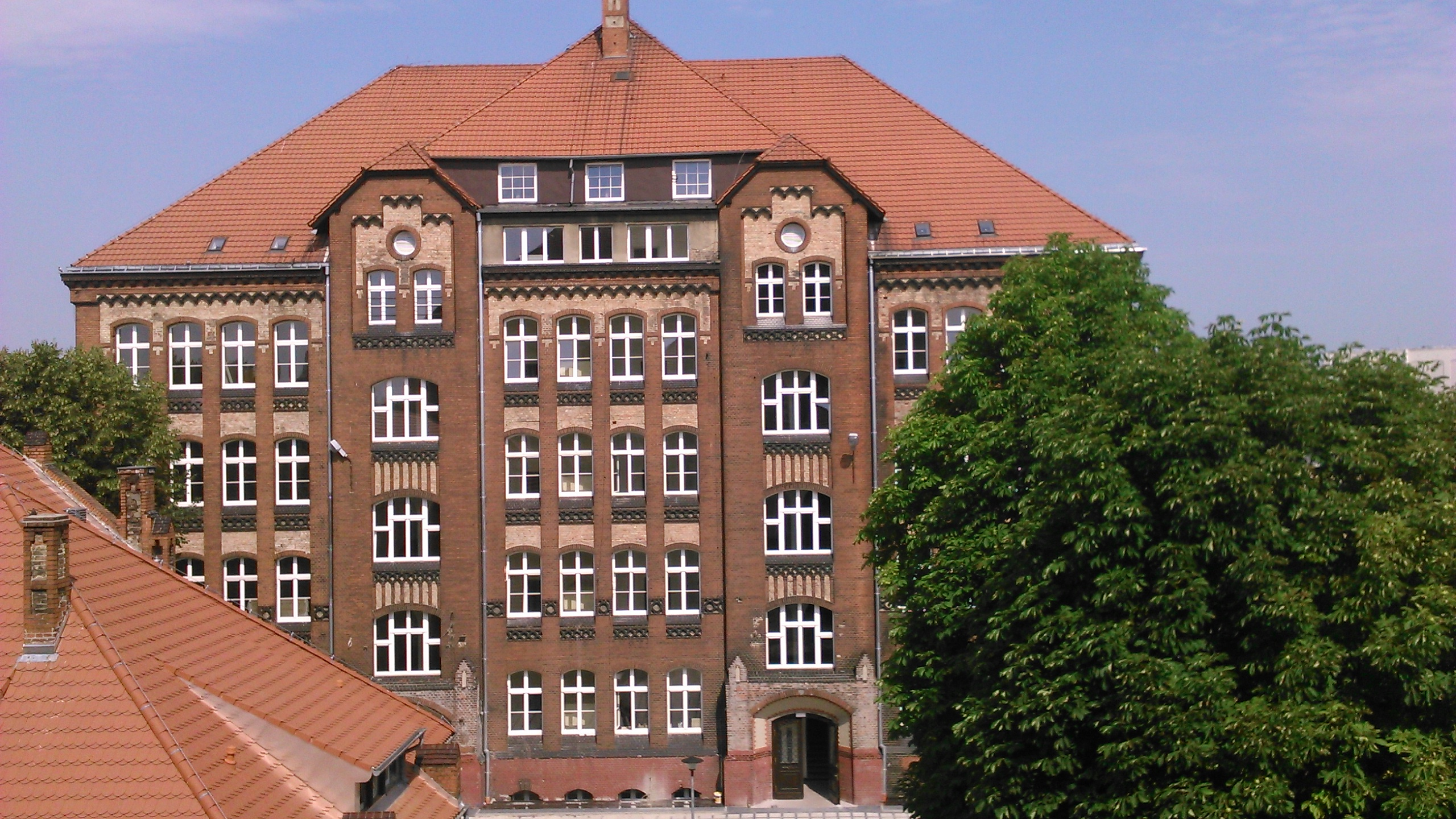

Adam Mickiewicz High School in Poznań (VIII Liceum Ogólnokształcące im. Adama Mickiewicza w Poznaniu) is a high school in Poznań, Poland founded by the priest and patriot Czesław Piotrowski in 1923 and named after the poet and patriot Adam Mickiewicz.

Some notable alumni include Anna Jantar, Ryszard Grobelny, Maria Pasło-Wiśniewska and Marcin Libicki. The most notable teacher was until recently the poet and writer Bogusława Latawiec.

Due to huge financial demands for general refit, Poznań's city authorities are considering the possibility of finding a new place for a school and building a modern edifice.
