= Wehikuł czasu =

1989 song by Dżem

Single by Dżem

from the album Najemnik
- Released: 1989
- Genre: blues rock, pop
- Length: 6:07
- Label: Atomica
- Songwriter: Ryszard Riedel
- Producer: Marcin Jacobson

Dżem singles chronology
"Modlitwa III" (1989)	"Wehikuł czasu" (1989)	"Tylko ja i ty" (1989)

Audio
- "Wehikuł czasu" on YouTube

"Wehikuł czasu" (Polish: [vɛˈxi.kuw ˈt͡ʂa.su]; lit. 'The Time Machine'), also known as "Wehikuł czasu / To był by cud" (Polish: [vɛˈxi.kuw ˈt͡ʂa.su ˈtɔ ˈbɘ̟w ˈbɘ̟ ˈt͡sut]; lit. 'The Time Machine / It Would Be a Miracle') is a Polish-language song by blues rock band Dżem, written and performed by Ryszard Riedel and composed by Adam Otręba. It was released in 1989 on the album Najemnik, published by Atomica.

Song also appears on the albums: Wehikuł czasu – Spodek '92 (1992), Akustycznie (1994), and Dżem w Operze cz. 1 (1998).

== Covers ==
The song was performed by the band Metallica during its concert in Kraków, Poland on 28 April 2018.

== Chart performance ==
=== Weekly charts ===
Chart (1998)	Peak position
Poland (LP3)	25

=== Yearly charts ===
Chart (2012)	Peak position
Poland (Polski Top Wszech Czasów)	16

== Personnel ==
- Vocals: Ryszard Riedel
- Lyrics: Ryszard Riedel
- Composition: Adam Otręba
- Producer: Marcin Jacobson
