= Małgorzata Kidawa-Błońska =

Polish politician (born 1957)

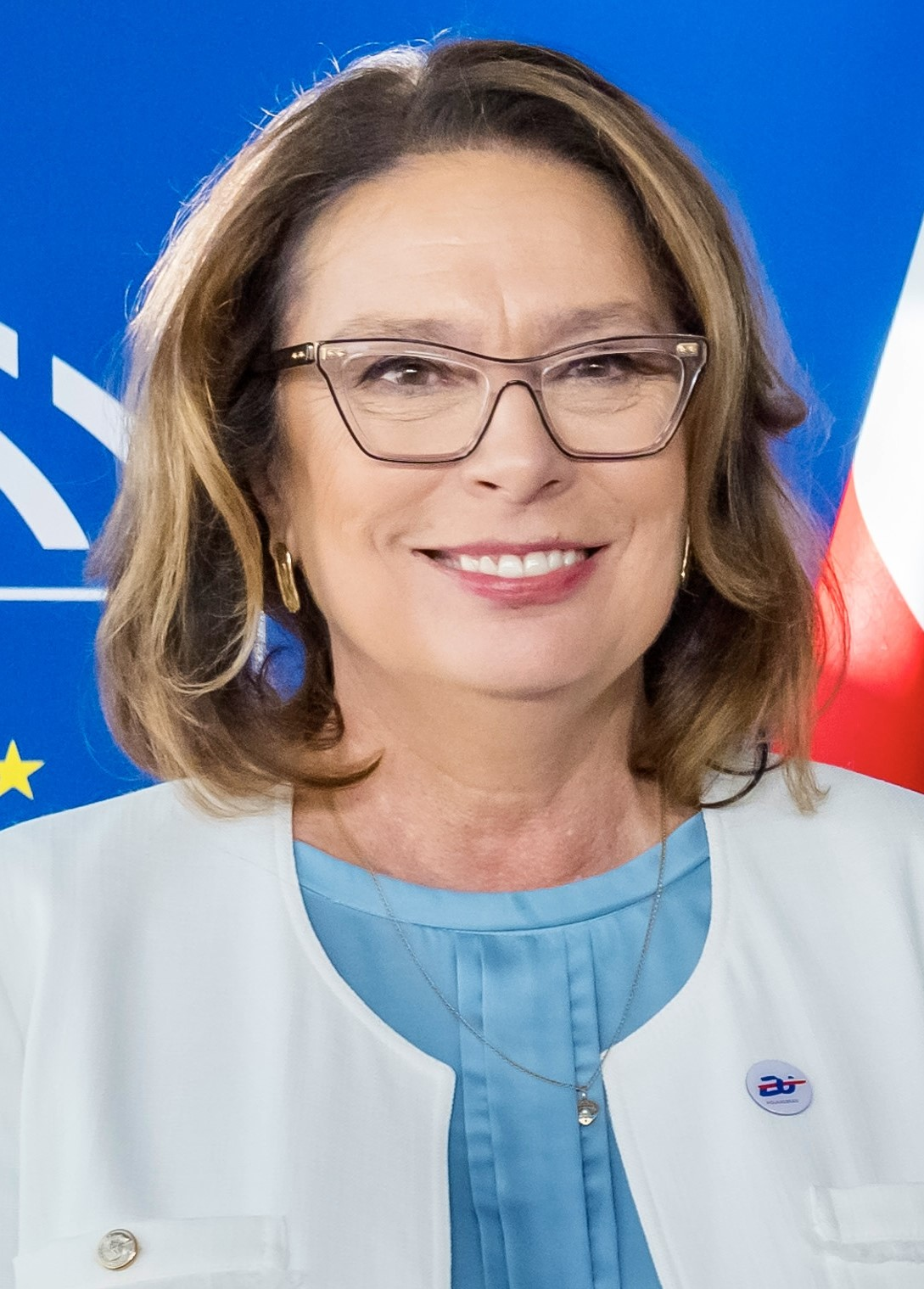
- Kidawa-Błońska in 2025

Marshal of the Senate
- Incumbent
- Assumed office 13 November 2023
- President: Andrzej Duda; Karol Nawrocki
- Preceded by: Tomasz Grodzki

Marshal of the Sejm
- In office 25 June 2015 – 11 November 2015
- President: Bronisław Komorowski; Andrzej Duda
- Preceded by: Radosław Sikorski
- Succeeded by: Marek Kuchciński

Deputy Marshal of the Sejm
- In office 12 November 2015 – 12 November 2023 Serving with See List
- Marshal: Marek Kuchciński; Elżbieta Witek

Government Spokeswoman
- In office 3 February 2015 – 25 June 2015
- Prime Minister: Ewa Kopacz
- Preceded by: Iwona Sulik
- Succeeded by: Cezary Tomczyk
- In office 7 January 2014 – 22 September 2014
- Prime Minister: Donald Tusk
- Preceded by: Paweł Graś
- Succeeded by: Iwona Sulik

Member of the Senate
- Incumbent
- Assumed office 13 November 2023
- Constituency: 43 - Warsaw

Member of the Sejm
- In office 19 October 2005 – 12 November 2023
- Constituency: 19 – Warsaw I

Personal details
- Born: Małgorzata Maria Grabska; 5 May 1957 (age 69) Ursus, Warsaw, Poland
- Party: Civic Platform (since 2001)
- Other political affiliations: Civic Coalition (since 2018)
- Spouse: Jan Kidawa-Błoński (m. 1983)
- Children: 1
- Relatives: Władysław Grabski (great-grandfather); Stanisław Wojciechowski (great-grandfather); Maria Wojciechowska (great-grandmother); Władysław Jan Grabski (paternal grandfather); Zofia Wojciechowska-Grabska (paternal grandmother)
- Education: University of Warsaw
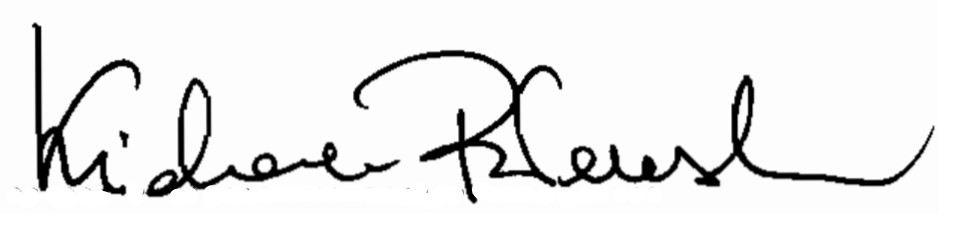
- Signature

Małgorzata Maria Kidawa-Błońska (née Grabska; Polish: [mawɡɔˈʐata kiˈdava ˈbwɔɲska]; born 5 May 1957) is a Polish politician, film producer, and sociologist currently serving as Marshal of the Senate. She was Marshal of the Sejm from 25 June 2015 to 11 November 2015 at the end of the Seventh term's composition of the lower house, after which being voted a Deputy Marshal of the Eighth and Ninth term, each time nominated by the opposition party Civic Platform, under the marshalcy of Marek Kuchciński and Elżbieta Witek, respectively. She is first to serve as the chairperson of both houses of the Polish Parliament.

Kidawa-Błońska served ministerial functions, such as Secretary of State in the Second Cabinet of Donald Tusk (2012–2014) and the Cabinet of Ewa Kopacz (2014–2015) and Press Spokeswoman for both cabinets in 2014 and 2015. She was the Civic Platform nominee for Prime Minister in the 2019 Polish parliamentary election, losing to Law and Justice incumbent Mateusz Morawiecki. In 2019, she was elected the Civic Platform's candidate for Presidency of Poland to stand in the 2020 Polish presidential election. Kidawa-Błońska resigned from her candidacy on 15 May 2020.

== Before entering politics ==
=== Family ===
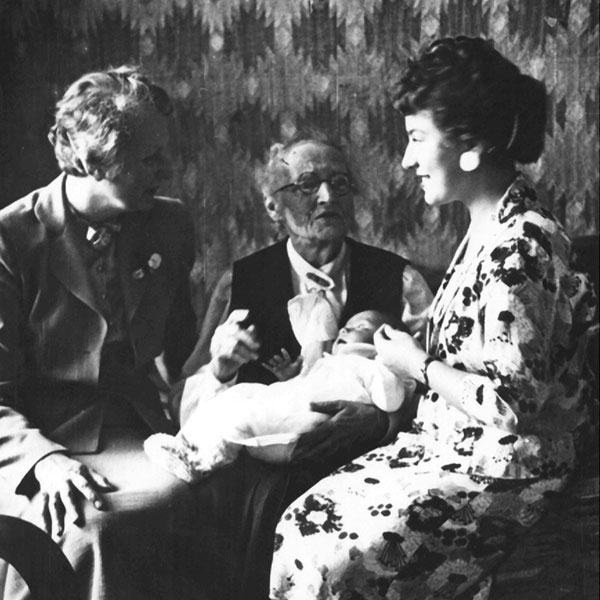
Photograph depicting four generations of Kidawa-Błońska's family: her paternal grandmother Zofia, and her paternal great-grandmother Maria (holding her great-granddaughter), and her mother Helena. (1958)

Małgorzata Maria Grabska was born in Ursus, Warsaw during the time of Communist Poland. Her father, Maciej Władysław Grabski, who came from a prominent Polish political family as a descendant of two notable politicians during the time of Interwar Poland, was a Professor of Technical Science for the Warsaw University of Technology and former President of the Foundation for Polish Science from 1992 to 2005, and her mother was Helena Nowakowska, was a former employee of the Press Workers' Cooperative and the winner in 1953 Fencing at the Kolejarz Sports Club where she met her future husband, who after the wedding devoted herself to running the house.

Maciej's father was Władysław Jan Grabski, a renowned writer who wrote historical novels on the History of Poland. He was the second son of Władysław Grabski, noted politician, independence activist, and economist who served as Prime Minister of Poland for two non-consecutive terms plus was the author of the currency reform which contained hyperinflation and stabilized the zloty exchange rate until 1939, and his wife Katarzyna Lewandowska, a daughter of a wealthy landowner of szlachta descent. Kidawa-Błońska's paternal grandmother was painter Zofia Wojciechowska-Grabska, the only surviving child of Stanisław Wojciechowski, who served as President of Poland from 1922 to 1926 after he was ousted by the May Coup d'État led by Marshal Józef Piłsudski, and his wife Maria Kiersnowska, who served as the First Lady during her husband's presidency. She was previously involved in the underground work and later became a courier for the Polish Socialist Party for the call for Polish Independence.

=== Youth ===
Kidawa-Błonska was born and remained in the same house where her paternal grandparents lived all her life. She assumed that her house was an exhalation of rich, multi-generational prescription furnished with antiques, paintings drawn by her paternal grandmother, and photographs of her ancestors on the walls. In 1927, her paternal great-grandfather received the permission for the construction of a residential house for his son Władysław Jan and his espoused wife Zofia Wojciechowska, after recently being married. The park, orchard and vegetable garden of the house were designed by the landscape architect Franciszek Szanior. After the Warsaw Uprising, Zofia's parents, Stanisław and Maria, were taken to live in the Grabski house, after being rescued from the demolished city. Her parents survived the Second World War, though her brother Edmund was murdered in Auschwitz-Birkenau. They lived in the house for the last remaining years until their deaths.

=== Education, professional activity and marriage ===
She was taught and passed her high school diploma in the Klementyna Hoffmanowa High School IX in Warsaw, the oldest high school in Warsaw. In 1983, she graduated a Master's degree of Sociological Studies at the Faculty of Philosophy and Sociology at the University of Warsaw. Kidawa-Błonska blended her professional career with film and culture. She went to classes at the Aleksander Zelwerowicz National Academy of Dramatic Art in Warsaw as a free witness out of interest, as she did not want to become an actress. In 1981, she met Jan Kidawa-Błoński at her 24th birthday party, when he accidentally came across her party in the Grabski residence. Jan recently graduated at the National Film School in Łódź and is the uncle of the deceased Ryszard Riedel, leader of Polish blues rock band Dżem. Jan & Malgorzata were married in 1983, during the time of the martial law. Kidawa-Błoński was in the process of making his first film "Trzy stopy nad ziemią". However, he did not receive a cent for this creation and he even went straight to the hospital due to starvation. Jan and Małgorzata have one son, Jan, who was born in 1983. From 1985 to 1987, she worked in the literary editorial office of the Film Studio named after Karol Irzykowski, and from 1994 to 2005, she worked with her husband at their company Gambit Production, in which she was responsible for the production of films, television programs and commercials. Their biggest undertaking was the award-winning film Destined for Blues, which tells the story of her nephew-in-marriage Ryszard Riedel.

== Political career ==
Kidawa-Błońska became enrolled in politics as a non-party member from the Freedom Union. In 2001, she became a member of the new Civic Platform party and became a Councillor in Warsaw City Council.

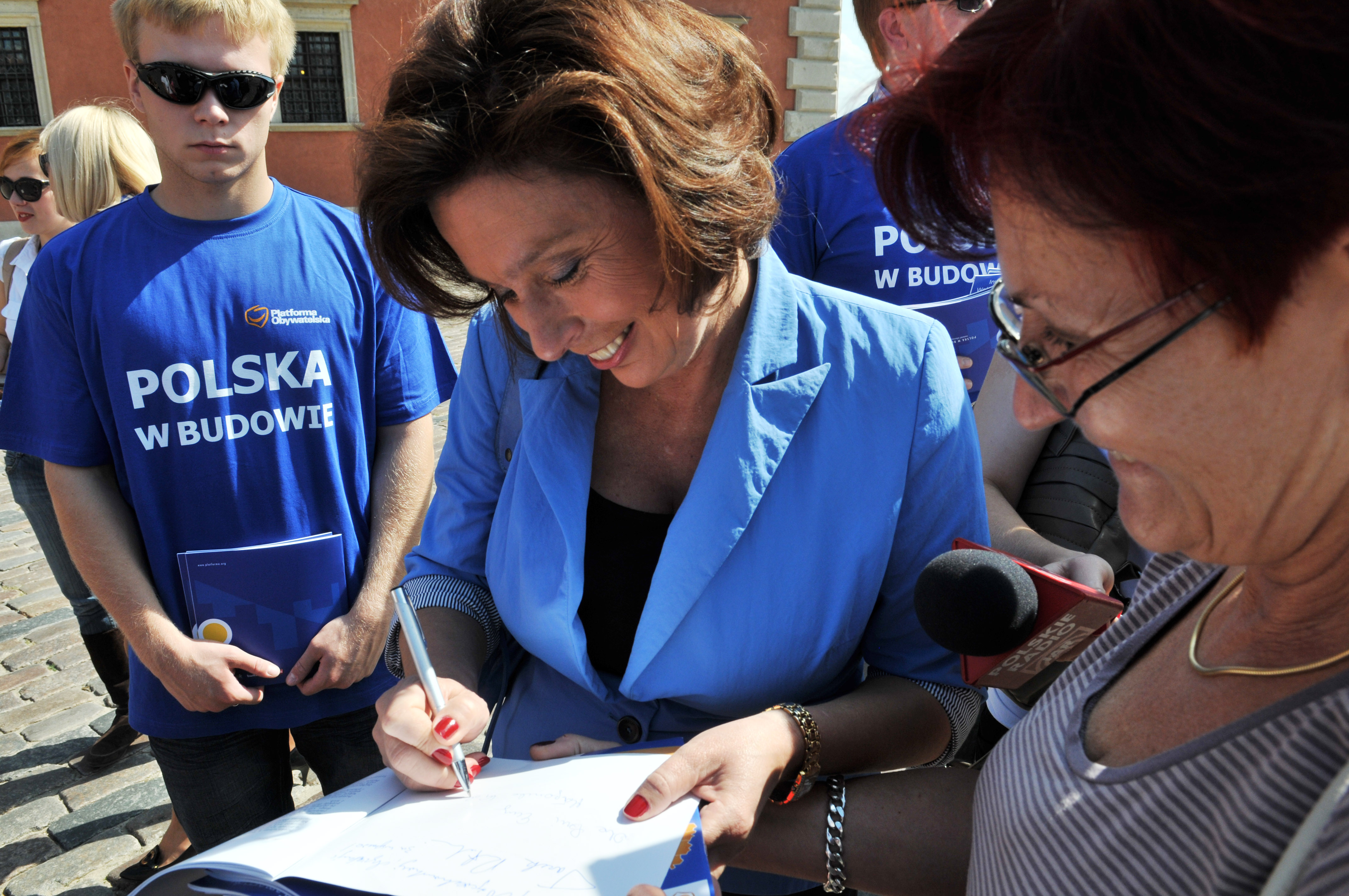
Kidawa-Błońska signing autographs for supporters in Warsaw, 2011

She was elected to the Sejm on 25 September 2005, getting 4,615 votes in 19 – Warsaw II district, as a candidate from the Civic Platform list. She was elected again following Donald Tusk's victory on 21 October 2007, after achieving 13,057 votes. In 2010, Kidawa-Błońska became the press spokeswoman for Bronisław Komorowski's presidential campaign. On 9 October 2011, she successfully applied for re-election with 2 positions on Warsaw's PO list, including 45,027 votes. She was appointed on 7 February 2014, as the Press Spokesperson of the Council of Ministers and Secretary of State in the Chancellery of the Prime Minister of Poland, until she resigned after Donald Tusk’s resignation on 22 September 2014. On 3 February 2015, She was appointed for the second time as the Press Spokesperson of the Council of Ministers for Ewa Kopacz's Cabinet.

On 23 June 2015, Radosław Sikorski decided to resign his office as Marshal of the Sejm, after 6 months in office. Two days later, she was nominated by Civic Platform as a candidate for Marshal, she was elected to the office, by receiving 244 votes from the Sejm. Her competitor Deputy Marshal, Jerzy Wenderlich from the Democratic Left Alliance, secured 43 votes. Seven days later, Bronisław Komorowski appointed her to the National Security Bureau. During her marshalcy, Kidawa-Błońska administered the oath of office for President Andrzej Duda on 6 August 2015.

In the 2015 Polish parliamentary election, she successfully applied for parliamentary re-election as the leader of Civic Platform electoral lists in the Warsaw district, she received 80,866 votes. At the inaugural meeting of the Sejm on 12 November 2015, she was named Deputy Marshal of the Sejm under her successor Marek Kuchciński. In her new position as Deputy Marshal, she became a member of the Culture and Media Committee in the Sejm. On 9 August 2019, Marek Kuchciński stepped down upon the mass critique of his use of government airplanes for private purposes. She was chosen as a candidate for Marshal of the Sejm by Civic Coalition. She received 135 votes, losing to the Law and Justice nominee Elżbieta Witek, who was supported by 245 deputies. On 11 December 2021 she became one of 10 vice-chairs of Civic Platform.

=== 2019 parliamentary campaign ===
On 3 September 2019, Grzegorz Schetyna announced that the Civic Coalition would nominate Kidawa-Błońska as its candidate for Prime Minister. A moment after unveiling this notice, she stated that Poland is now in a "very difficult moment" and that "People want Poland to be a country where everyone respects each other". She received 416,030 votes, which was the best individual result in the country and the second-best individual result in whole election history. The coalition still lost the parliamentary election by winning 134 seats in the Sejm, but gained the Senate by winning 43 seats and forming a coalition with other opposition parties. On 12 November 2019, she kept her position as Deputy Marshal.

== 2020 presidential election ==
=== Civic Platform primaries ===
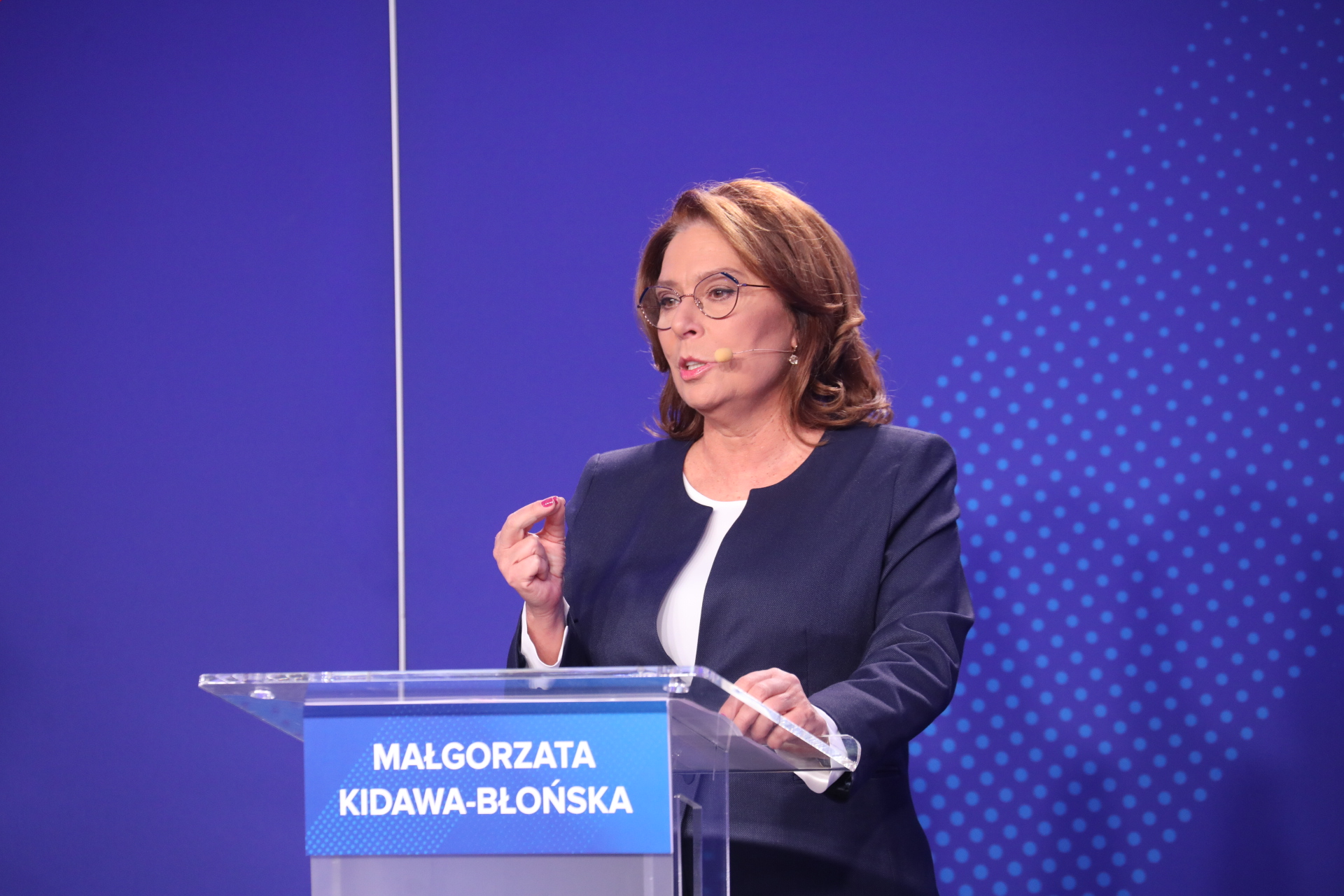
Kidawa-Błońska during her campaign for the presidential primary, 2019

She announced her intention to take part in Civic Platform's presidential primaries to become party's candidate in the 2020 presidential elections in Poland. The primary was organized by the party leader Grzegorz Schetyna following the decision by Donald Tusk not to run for president again as he lost in a runoff to Lech Kaczyński in 2005, and then served as Prime Minister of Poland from 2007 to 2014 after which he resigned to become President of the European Council. Prior to his withdrawal, Tusk was thought to be the presumptive nominee. The voting took place during a special conference on 14 December. It was announced that she won those primaries (by receiving 345 electorate votes, compared to Jacek Jaśkowiak's 125 votes) and therefore she became Civic Platform's candidate for president.

=== Presidential campaign ===
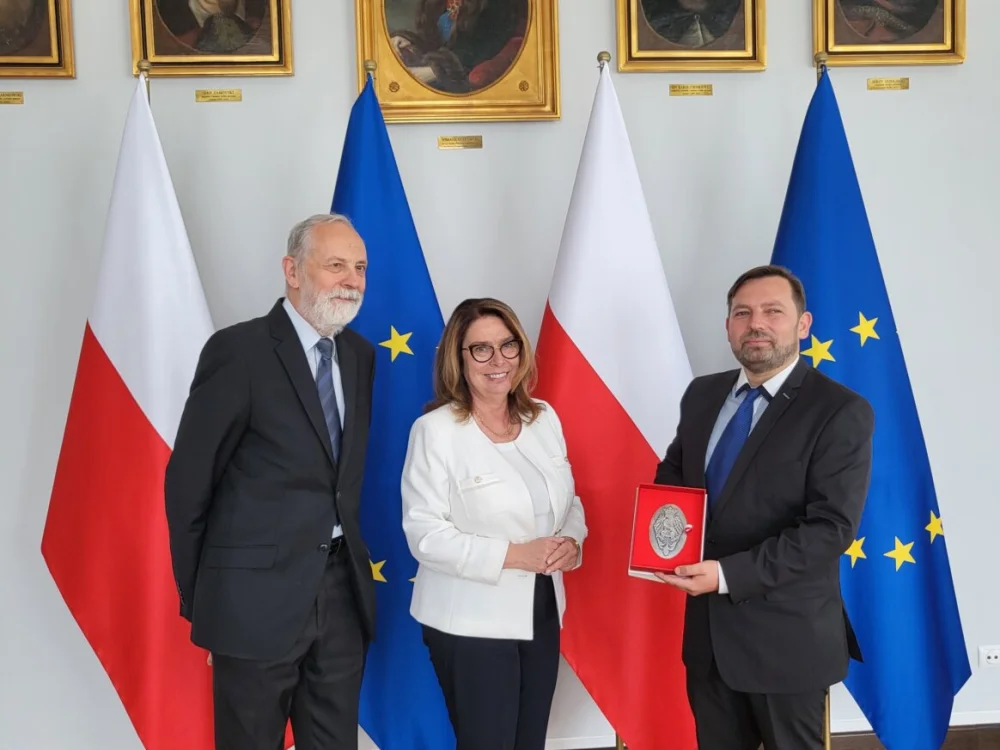
Małgorzata Kidawa-Błońska, Marshal of the Senate of the Republic of Poland, presents the Medal of the Senate of the Republic of Poland to Dawid Jung, 2024

After becoming the presumptive Civic Platform nominee, Kidawa-Błońska changed her focus to the presidential election. She began campaigning against Andrzej Duda. In reaction to coronavirus procedure and recent changes of the electoral law, enacted before changing the date of presidential election, Kidawa-Błońska suspended her campaign and called for a boycott of the 10 May election.

==== Coronavirus outbreak ====
On 10 March 2020, Kidawa-Błońska announced on her Twitter account that she would temporarily suspend large open conferences and introduce changes in the control of her campaign.

=== Resignation from candidacy ===
After the election date was moved from May 10, her presidential campaign ended. On 15 May, she announced her intention to withdraw from the presidential election, most likely as a result of falling poll numbers. The same day, she was replaced with Rafał Trzaskowski.

== 2023 Senate candidacy ==
In the 2023 Polish parliamentary election, she was elected to the Senate of Poland from District 43.

On 13 November 2023, she was elected as Marshal of the Senate, a position she is expected to hold for the next two years. As per coalition agreement signed by Civic Coalition, Third Way and New Left, she will be later succeeded by another senator nominated by Civic Coalition.

== See also ==
- List of politicians in Poland
- 2005 Polish parliamentary election
- 2007 Polish parliamentary election
- 2011 Polish parliamentary election
- 2015 Polish parliamentary election

Political offices
Preceded by Radosław Sikorski	Marshal of the Sejm; 2015	Succeeded by Marek Kuchciński
Preceded by Tomasz Grodzki	Marshal of the Senate; 2023–present	Incumbent
Order of precedence
Preceded by Włodzimierz Czarzasty as Marshal of the Sejm	Order of precedence of Poland; Marshal of the Senate	Succeeded by Donald Tusk as Prime Minister
