= 2024 Civic Coalition presidential primary =

Polish political primary

- 22 November 2024

22,126 votes cast
- Turnout: 88.5% (out of 25 thousand)
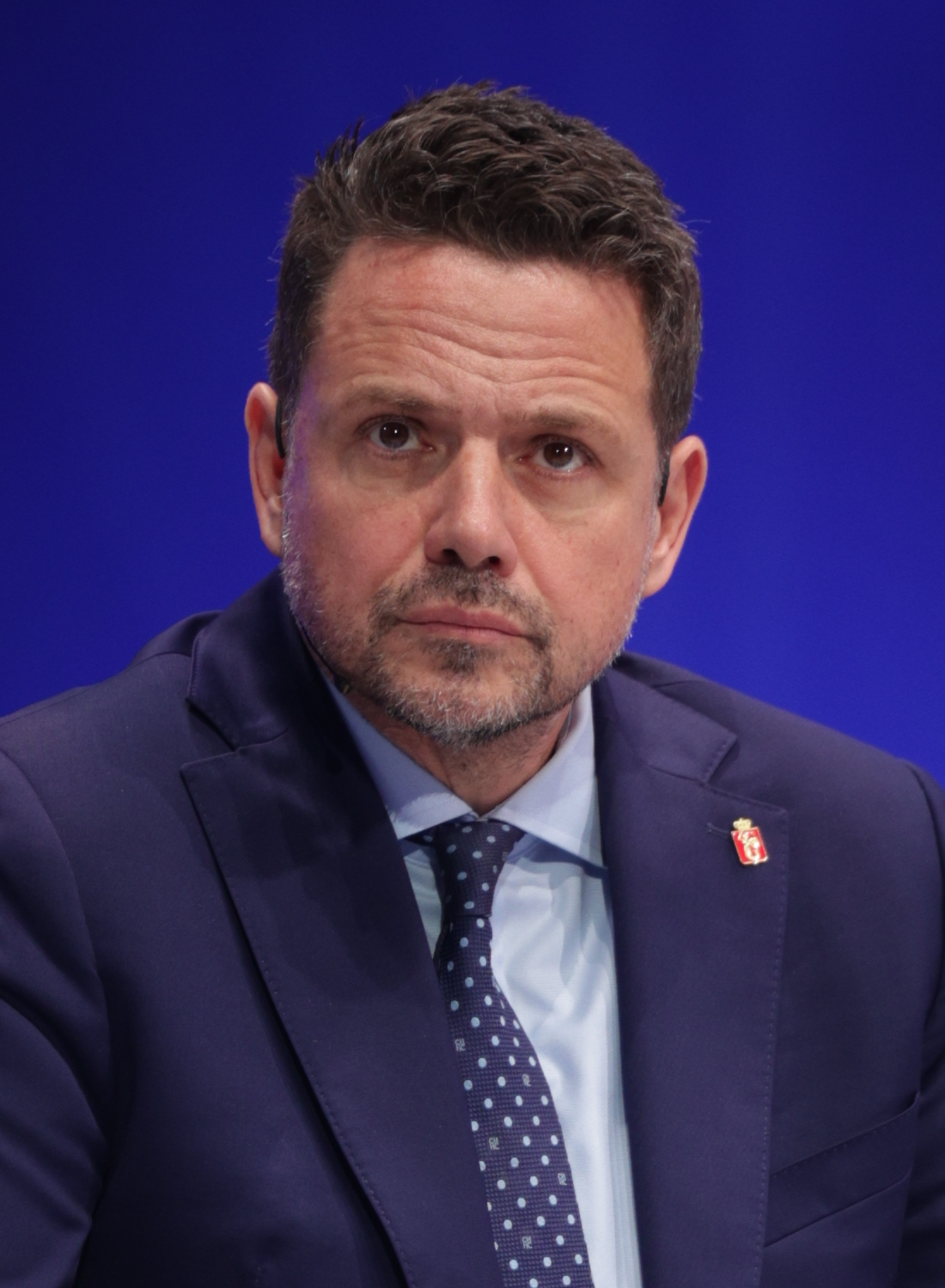

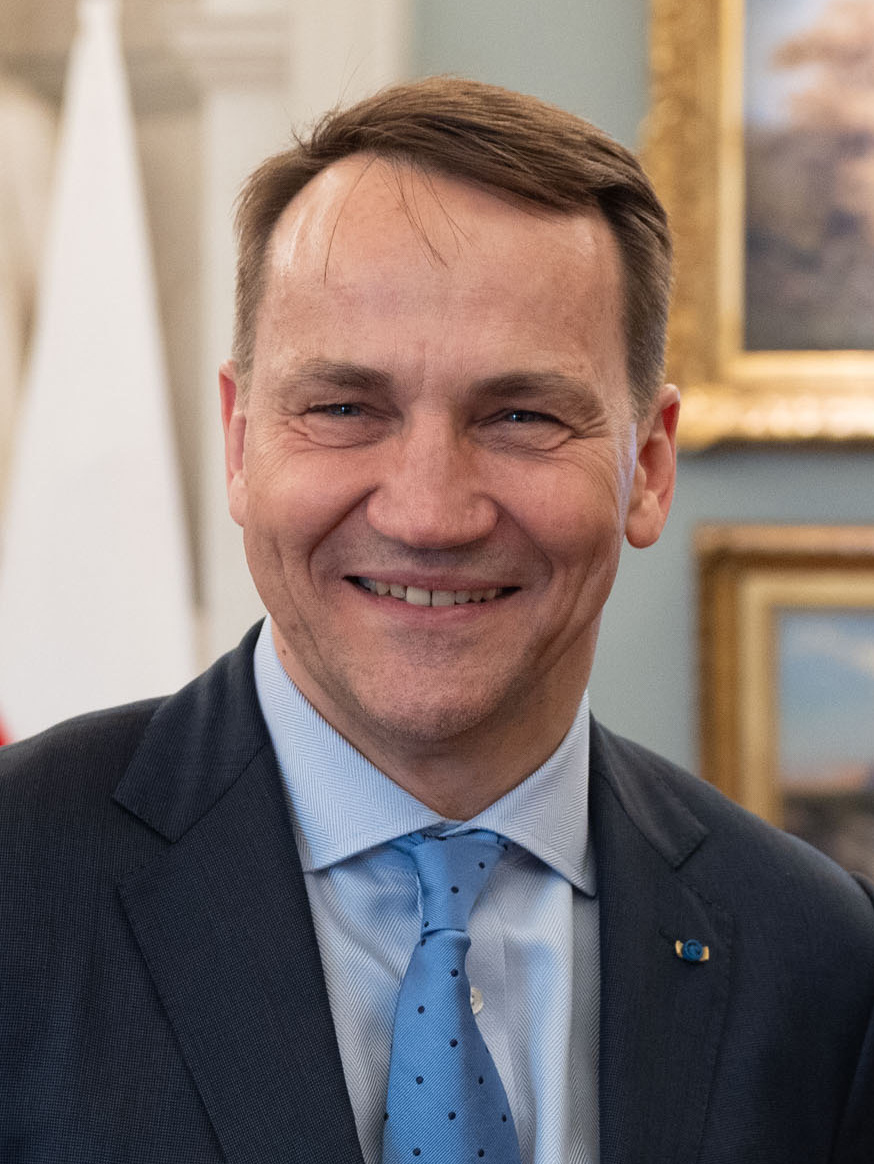
Nominee	Rafał Trzaskowski	Radosław Sikorski
Party	PO	PO
Popular vote	16,539	5,587
Percentage	74.75%	25.25%
Presidential nominee
Rafał Trzaskowski
PO

The 2024 Civic Coalition presidential primary were the third Polish presidential primary election after the 2010 and 2019 primaries for the Civic Platform party. The primary was organized by the coalition following the decision by Donald Tusk not to run for president again (he lost in a runoff to Lech Kaczyński in 2005 and has served as prime minister from 2007 to 2014 and since 2023). Two main candidates emerged: Minister of Foreign Affairs Radosław Sikorski and Mayor of Warsaw, candidate for president in 2020 Rafał Trzaskowski. All parties of the Civic Coalition (Civic Platform, Modern, Polish Initiative, The Greens) were invited to take part in the primaries. The voting took place on 22 November 2024, and the party's nominee, Rafał Trzaskowski, was announced the following day. 22,126 votes were cast in the primary. Trzaskowski would go on to lose the general election to PiS-endorsed candidate Karol Nawrocki in the second round held on 1 June 2025, marking his second consecutive loss in a presidential election, and the party's third consecutive loss in a presidential election.

== Electoral system ==
Members of the Civic Coalition's four parties (Civic Platform, The Greens, Modern and Polish Initiative) were eligible to vote in the primary, regardless of whether they pay the membership dues or not, with a total of around 25,000 eligible party members. Voting was held via responding to an SMS sent to all party members, by replying with either "1" or "2" to cast a vote for Trzaskowski and Sikorski respectively. Voting took place from 8:00 to midnight.

== Candidates ==
Civic Platform nominee
Rafał Trzaskowski	Radosław Sikorski
Warsaw mayor (since 2018)	Minister of Foreign Affairs (2007–2014, since 2023)

== See also ==
- 2025 Polish presidential election
