= Tomasz Kot =

Polish actor (born 1977)

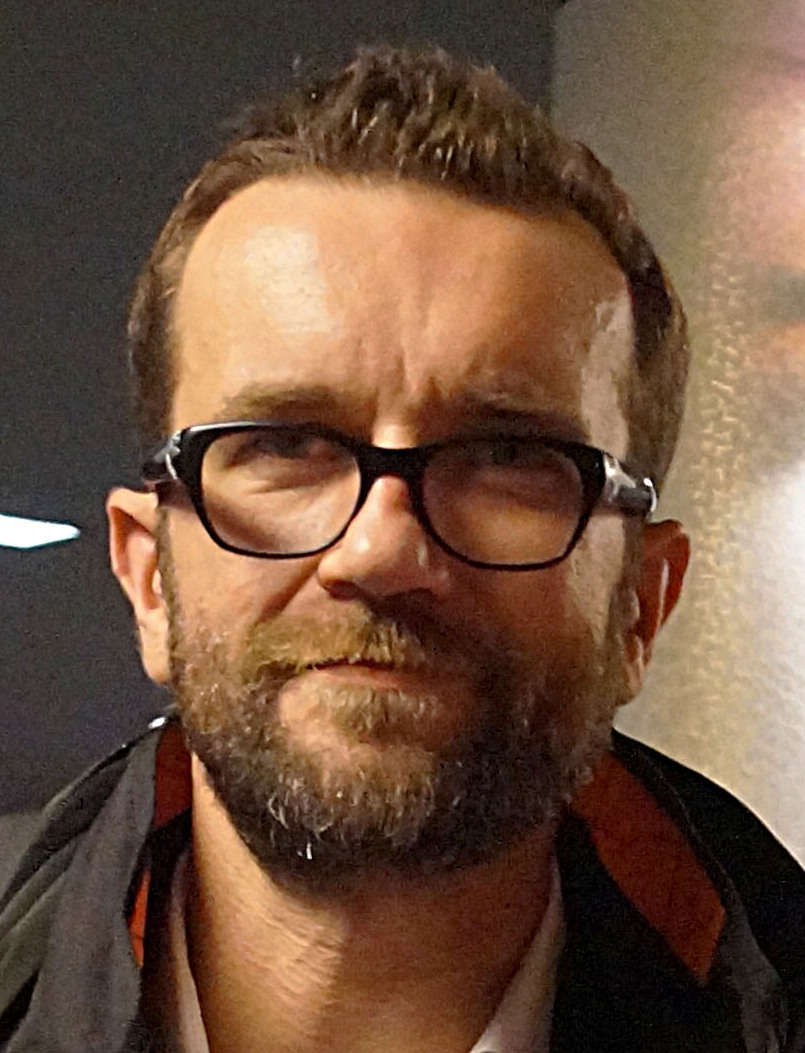
- Kot in 2017
- Born: 21 April 1977 (age 49); Legnica, Poland
- Education: National Academy of Theatre Arts in Kraków
- Occupation: Actor
- Years active: 1996–present
- Height: 6 ft 6 1/4 in (199 cm)
- Spouse: Agnieszka Olczyk (m. 2006)
- Children: 2

Tomasz Kot (Polish pronunciation: [ˈtɔmaʂ ˈkɔt]; born 21 April 1977) is a Polish film, television, and theatre actor. He has appeared in more than 30 films and 26 plays as well as dozens of television series. He received the Polish Academy Award for Best Actor for his role in 2014 film Gods.

== Education and career ==
He graduated from the Tadeusz Kościuszko High School No. 1 in Legnica. On 17 November 1996, he made his theatre debut on the stage of the Dramatic Theatre in Legnica in Stanisław Ignacy Witkiewicz's play Madame Tutli-Putli directed by Wiesław Cichy. In 2001, he graduated from the AST National Academy of Theatre Arts in Kraków. He gained great popularity by portraying singer Ryszard Riedel in Jan Kidawa Błoński's 2005 film Destined for Blues as well as for his role as Zbigniew Religa in Łukasz Palkowski's 2014 film Gods. In 2015, he was awarded the Medal for Merit to Culture – Gloria Artis.

In 2018, Kot received award-season buzz for his starring role as Wiktor in Paweł Pawlikowski’s feature Cold War for Amazon. The project has earned him a nomination for best actor by the European Film Awards and the movie has been recognized by the Critics' Choice Movie Awards, New York Film Critics Circle, and the National Board of Review in the best foreign language film category. In 2018 Kot appeared in Agnieszka Holland’s Spoor and had a starring role in Jaroslaw Marszewski’s “Bikini Blue,” the latter earning him the award for best lead actor at the Milan Film Festival. In 2019 Kot starred in BBC One series World on Fire alongside Brian J. Smith, Julia Brown, and Helen Hunt.

== Personal life ==
On 30 September 2006 in Częstochowa, he married actress Agnieszka Olczyk. They have two children: Blanka (b. 2007) and Leon (b. 2010).

== Selected filmography ==
Year	Title	Role	Notes
2005	Destined for Blues	Ryszard Riedel	
2007	Testosterone	Robal	
2007	Dlaczego Nie	Dawid	
2009	Operation Danube	Lt. January Jakubczak	
2010	Erratum	Michał Bogusz	
2012	Hans Kloss. Stawka większa niż śmierć	Stanisław Kolicki, codename J-23/Hans Kloss	
2012	Yuma	Opat	
2014	Gods	Zbigniew Religa	
2014	Fotograf	Bauman	
2016	Spoor	Pros. Świerszczyński	
2017	Najlepszy	Okoń	
2017	Volta	Jan Krone	
2018	Cold War	Wiktor	
2019	World on Fire	Stefen Tomaszeski	
2020	A Perfect Enemy	Jeremiasz Angust	
2021	Soul	Joe Gardner	Polish dub
2021	Leave No Traces	Kowalczyk	
2021	Warning	Brian	
2023	Kleks Academy	Professor Kleks	
2023	Joika	Vitaliy Ivanov	
2023	The Breach	Maciej Tomski	
2024	Kulej. All That Glitters Isn't Gold	Sikorski	

== See also ==
- Cinema of Poland
- List of Poles
