= Destined for Blues =

- Poster
- Polish: Skazany na bluesa
- Directed by: Jan Kidawa-Błoński
- Written by: Jan Kidawa-Błoński; Przemyslaw Angerman
- Produced by: Małgorzata Kidawa-Błońska; Jan Kidawa-Błoński
- Starring: Tomasz Kot; Jolanta Fraszyńska; Maciej Balcar
- Cinematography: Grzegorz Kuczeriszka
- Edited by: Cezary Grzesiuk
- Music by: Dżem
- Release date: 12 August 2005
- Running time: 101 minutes
- Country: Poland
- Language: Polish

Destined for Blues (Polish: Skazany na bluesa) is a 2005 Polish biographical musical drama film directed by Jan Kidawa-Błoński. It tells the story of Ryszard "Rysiek" Riedel, leader of Polish blues rock band Dżem. The movie concentrates on his family relationships with both his wife Małgorzata and his father, his music career and his addiction to "kompot". Destined for Blues won Polish Film Awards for Best Costume Design and Gdynia Polish Film Festival awards for Best Costume Design, Best Debut Actor (Tomasz Kot) and Audience Award.

Film was shot in Tychy, Katowice, Warsaw, Nieporęt and Świętochłowice in October 2004.

== Cast ==
- Tomasz Kot as Ryszard Riedel
- Jolanta Fraszyńska as Małgorzata "Gola" Riedel
- Maciej Balcar as Indianer
- Adam Baumann as Ryszard's father
- Anna Dymna as Małgorzata's mother
- Joanna Bartel as Ryszard's mother
- Przemysław Bluszcz as Leszek Martinek
- Paweł Berger as himself
- Beno Otręba as himself
- Adam Otręba as himself
- Jerzy Styczyński as himself
- Zbigniew Szczerbiński as himself
- Błażej Otreba as Drummer
- Zbigniew Zamachowski as School janitor
- Przemysław Saleta as Gruber's bodyguard

== Awards ==
- Polish Film Awards
  - Best Costume Design – Ewa Krauze
- Gdynia Polish Film Festival
  - Best Costume Design – Ewa Krauze
  - Best Debut Actor – Tomasz Kot
  - Audience Award – Jan Kidawa-Błoński

== Nominations ==
- Gdynia Polish Film Festival
  - Best Actor – Tomasz Kot
  - Best Actress – Jolanta Fraszyńska
  - Best Supporting Actress – Anna Dymna
  - Best Cinematography – Grzegorz Kuczeriszka
  - Best Editing – Cezary Grzesiuk
  - Best Film Score – Dżem
  - Best Production Design – Joanna Białousz

== Soundtrack ==
Soundtrack was released 7 November 2005. It is a compilation of Dżem's songs.

- Złoty paw – 6:03 (A Golden Peacock)
- Wiem, na pewno wiem – nie, nie kocham cię (live) (I Know, I Know For Sure – I Don't Love You) – 4:58
- Czerwony jak cegła (As Red As a Brick) – 5:19
- List do M. (Letter to M.) – 6:52
- Mała aleja róż (live) (Little Avenue of Roses) – 5:34
- Sen o Victorii (live) (A Dream about Victoria) – 2:58
- Jesiony (Ash-trees) – 6:40
- Norweska impresja bluesowa (live) (Norwegian Blues Impression) – 3:22
- Skazany na bluesa (Destined for Blues) – 5:26
- Autsajder (Outsider) – 6:38
- Whisky – 5:26
- Niewinni i ja – cz. I i II (live) (The Innocent and Me – Part I & II) – 14:17
