= Jacek Jaśkowiak =

Polish politician and entrepreneur

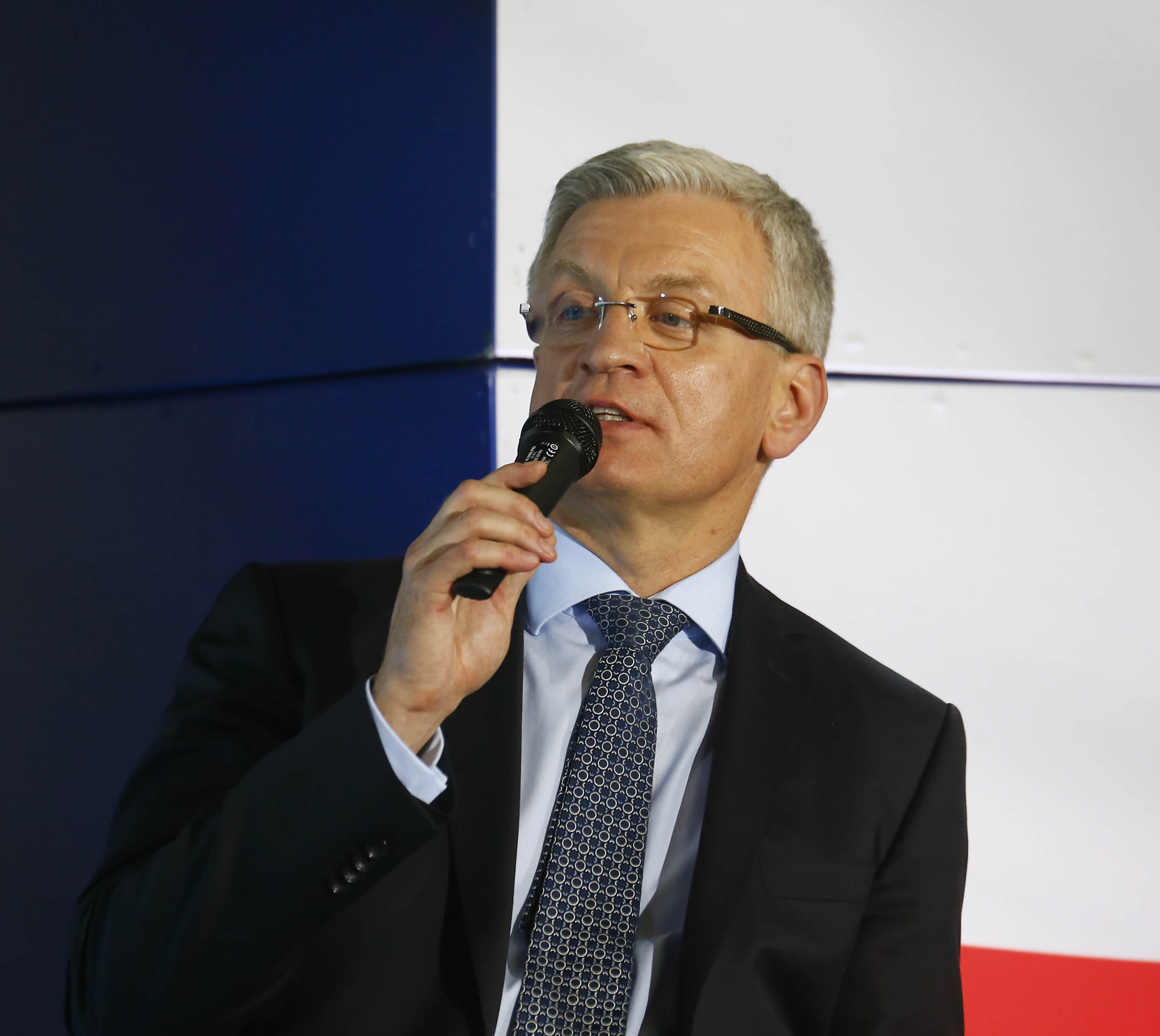
- Jacek Jaśkowiak in 2016

Mayor of Poznań
- Incumbent
- Assumed office 8 December 2014
- Preceded by: Ryszard Grobelny

Personal details
- Born: 10 March 1964 (age 62) Poznań, Poland
- Party: Civic Platform
- Spouse: Joanna Jaśkowiak
- Education: UAM Poznań; Bielefeld University
- Profession: politician, entrepreneur

Jacek Jaśkowiak (born 10 March 1964) is a Polish politician and entrepreneur. He is the current mayor of the city of Poznań, Greater Poland Voivodeship, Poland, and a member of the Civic Platform political party, in which he is considered as a part of the party's socially liberal wing.

== Life and education ==
He graduated in law and administration from the Adam Mickiewicz University in Poznań. He also completed postgraduate studies in finance and tax law. He received a GFPS-Poland scholarship and studied at Bielefeld University, Germany. As a student, Jaśkowiak was a member of the Rural Youth Union (Polish: Związek Młodzieży Wiejskiej).

In the 1990s, he started to pursue a career in business and worked as a sales director at Kulczyk Tradex – a company belonging to billionaire Jan Kulczyk. In 1997, he established his own firm specializing in economic consulting. In the same year, he met Jacek Kaczmarski and worked as his manager. In 2007 he became the CEO of the Jaśkowiak Sp. Z.o.o company providing accounting services to middle-sized foreign businesses.

In 2012 and 2014, he was one of the organizers of the FIS Cross-Country World Cup events in Szklarska Poręba.

== Political career ==
In the 2010 Polish local elections he unsuccessfully stood for office of the mayor of Poznań representing "My Poznaniacy" initiative gaining 7.16% of the votes. In 2013, he officially became a member of the Civic Platform political party and in the 2014 Polish local elections he ran for the post of mayor of Poznań as a Civic Platform candidate. He received 21.46% of the votes in the first round and made it to the second round where he defeated the then-mayor of Poznań Ryszard Grobelny after 16 years of his mayorship in the city receiving 59.09% of the votes. In the 2018 Polish local elections he was successfully re-elected as mayor of Poznań gaining 55.99% of the votes in the first round.

In 2018, as the first mayor of Poznań in history, he provided honorary patronage over the LGBT Poznań Pride Week as well as the Poznań Gay Pride Parade in which he personally participated.

In 2019, Jaśkowiak stood in the Civic Platform presidential primaries. Securing only 125 votes out of 475 electors total, he lost to Małgorzata Kidawa-Błońska.

== Personal life ==
He married a notary Joanna Jaśkowiak. He has two children: Jarosław and Stanisław. His interests include cross-country skiing, boxing and theatre, and loves to bike. Jaśkowiak is also an ardent promoter of the musical legacy of Jacek Kaczmarski with whom he collaborated in the past. He is an atheist.
