= Maria Wojciechowska =

First Lady of Poland from 1922 to 1926

3rd First Lady of Poland
- In office 20 December 1922 – 15 May 1926
- President: Stanisław Wojciechowski
- Preceded by: Vacant (Before the vacancy was Aleksandra Piłsudska)
- Succeeded by: Michalina Mościcka

Personal details
- Born: Maria Kiersnowska; 15 December 1869 Warsaw, Congress Poland, Russian Empire
- Died: 14 September 1959 (aged 89) Gołąbki, Warsaw, Polish People's Republic
- Spouse: Stanisław Wojciechowski (m. 1899 – d. 1953)
- Children: 2, including Zofia
- Relatives: Władysław Jan Grabski (son-in-law); Maciej Władysław Grabski (grandson); Małgorzata Kidawa-Błońska (great-granddaughter)

Maria Wojciechowska, née Kiersnowska (15 December 1869 – 14 September 1959), was the First Lady of Poland from 1922 to 1926 as the wife of President Stanisław Wojciechowski.

== Biography ==
=== Early life ===
Maria Kiersnowska was born on 15 December 1869 in Warsaw as one of the twelve children of Antoni Kiersnowski of the Pobóg coat of arms. She was brought up in the Independence tradition. Her paternal grandfather, Jan Kiersnowski was sent to Siberia for participating in the November uprising, and her maternal uncle, Stanisław Iszora, a priest and vicar from Żołudek (now Belarus) was shot on 22 May 1863, in Vilnius on Łukiszki Square for reading the manifesto of the National Government from the pulpit and urging parishioners to participate in the uprising, becoming the first victim of Murawiow's terror.

=== Career ===
She graduated from the Mariinsky Institute in Vilnius, the highest education available to women at that time, she was a friend of Józef Piłsudski from school. She later became involved in the underground work and became a courier for the Polish Socialist Party (PPS). During this activity, she met Stanisław Wojciechowski, they were married in 1899, before leaving for emigration. The wedding took place under a conspiracy, because Wojciechowski used false documents, so he did not have the civil form required in the Russian partition. As a result, they already entered into a civil marriage in England, in Bethnal Green on 2 December 1899.

On 9 December 1922, her husband stood as a candidate in the Presidential election but was defeated in the fourth ballot to the landowner Count Maurycy Klemens Zamoyski and the later elected Gabriel Narutowicz, from PSL as the first President of Poland. Following the assassination of President Narutowicz by the ultra-nationalist painter Eligiusz Niewiadomski on 16 December 1922, the candidacy waiver Piłsudski, who did not want to be blocked in a "gilded cage" according to his own words, Wojciechowski was, by the National Assembly on the recommendation of Sejm marshal Maciej Rataj with the votes of the Left and the Centre on the first ballot, elected head of state, which made Maria the First Lady of Poland.

After the May Coup, her husband was forced, along with the Polish Prime Minister Wincenty Witos, to resign as President and leave Belvedere Palace.

== Family life ==
Stanisław and Maria had two children who were both born in England. A son Edmund (1903–1941), a lawyer who was murdered in Auschwitz, and a daughter Zofia (1905–1992), a painter who married Władysław Jan Grabski, son of the Polish Prime Minister Władysław Grabski, and was the mother of Maciej Władysław Grabski. Zofia is the grandmother of the 2020 Civic Platform candidate for President, Małgorzata Kidawa-Błońska.

=== Death ===
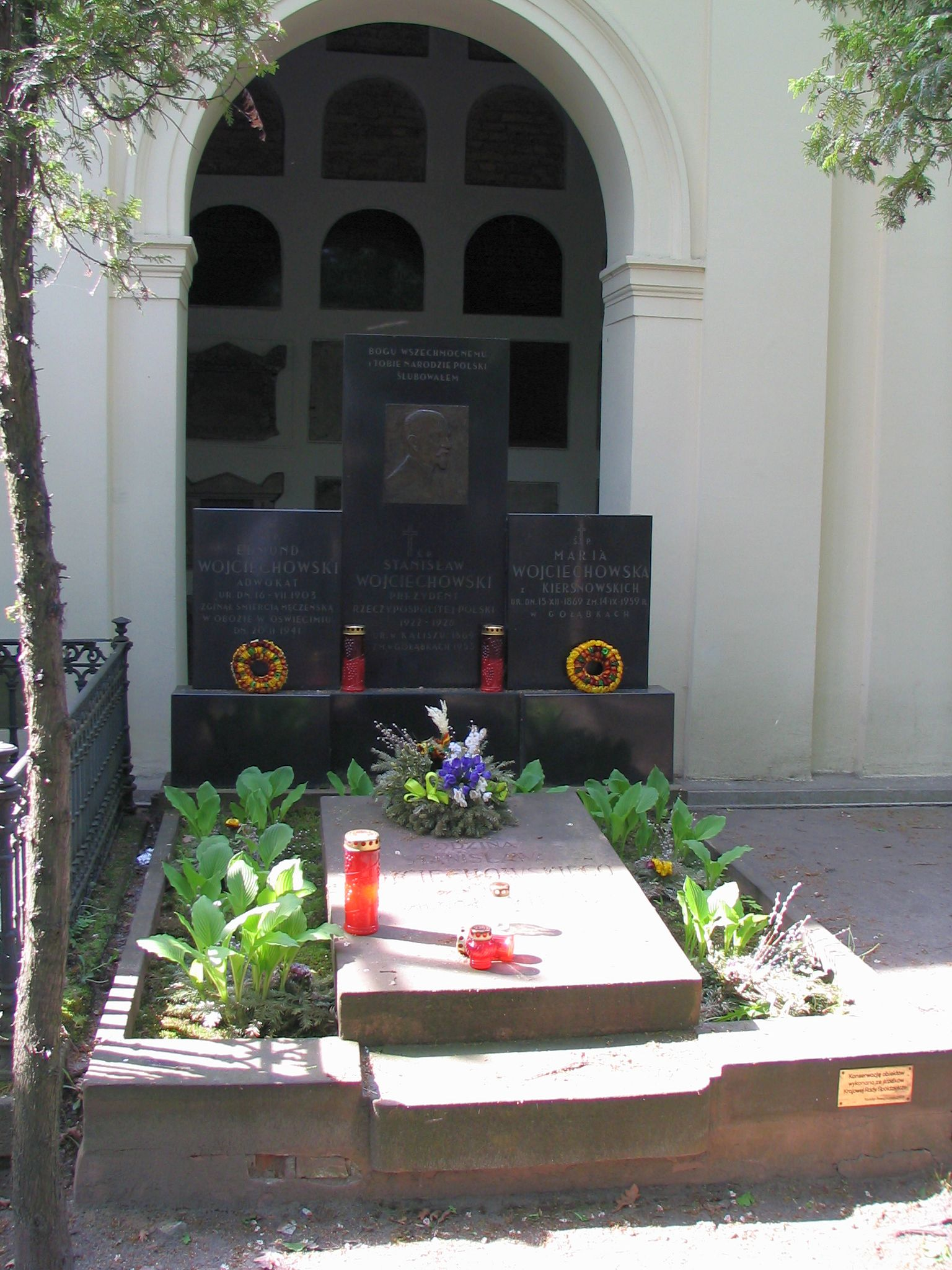
The family grave in the Powązki Cemetery

Maria Wojciechowska died on 14 September 1959 at the age of 89, she is buried next to her husband and son in Powązki Cemetery.

== Bibliography ==
- Stanisław Wojciechowski, Moje wspomnienia, t. I., Lwów 1938.
- Zdzisław Pawluczuk, Konspirator i Prezydent. Rzecz o Stanisławie Wojciechowskim, Lublin: Globus, 1993.
- Kamil Janicki, Pierwsze Damy II Rzeczpospolitej. Prawdziwe historie, Kraków: Znak, 2012
