= Władysław Jan Grabski =

Polish writer, publicist and poet

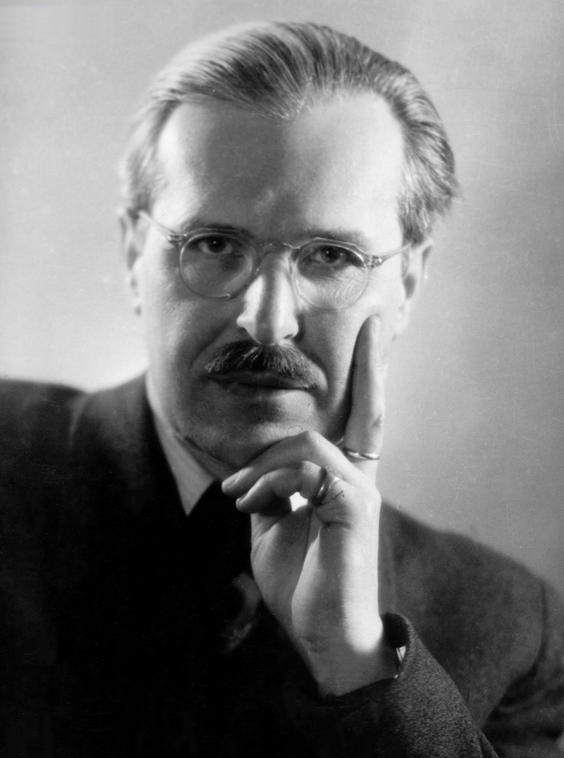
- Władysław Jan Grabski in 1952
- Born: 21 October 1901; Warsaw, Congress Poland, Russian Empire
- Died: 3 November 1970 (aged 69); Warsaw, Polish People’s Republic
- Resting place: Powązki Cemetery
- Education: University of Warsaw
- Occupations: Poet, Writer
- Spouse: Zofia Wojciechowska (m. 1927)
- Children: 4, including Maciej
- Relatives: Władysław Grabski (father); Stanisław Grabski (uncle); Zofia Kirkor-Kiedroniowa (aunt); Andrzej Feliks Grabski (nephew); Stanisław Wojciechowski (father-in-law); Maria Wojciechowska (mother-in-law); Małgorzata Kidawa-Błońska (granddaughter)
- Writing career
- Language: Polish
- Notable awards: Literary Prize of the Polish Episcopate (1949); Literary Prize of Pietrzak (1956 and 1963); Award of the Minister of Culture and Art, Second Degree (1965); Knight's Cross of the Order of Polonia Restituta (1969)

Władysław Jan Grabski (21 October 1901 – 3 November 1970) was a Polish writer, publicist and poet. His work is embedded in the Catholic current. He wrote both historical novels related to the History of Poland as well as contemporary novels.

== Biography ==
Władysław Jan Grabski was born on 21 October 1901 in Warsaw to Władysław Grabski, Prime Minister of Poland who served three times, and Katarzyna née Lewandowska. He spent his childhood as described in the autobiographical novel Scarves of Childhood in Borów and St. Petersburg. In the years of 1912–1914, he attended the Konopczyński Junior High School. After the outbreak of World War I, he went with his parents to St. Petersburg, where he studied at the Moscow School of the Order of St Catherine, with a six-month break, when, after the outbreak of the Russian Revolution in mid-1917, she and her mother and siblings moved to Feodosia in Crimea. In April 1918, after the conclusion of the Treaty of Brest-Litovsk, the whole family returned to Warsaw. In 1920, he graduated from the Adam Mickiewicz Gymnasium in Vilnius.

In July, he volunteered for the Volunteer Army, served in the 24th Uhlan Regiment and took part in operations in Central Lithuania. After the demobilization on November 25, 1920, he started studying at the Faculty of Law of the University of Warsaw. After graduating in 1924, he went to Sorbonne, where he studied the history of economic doctrines as well as the history of the Middle Ages, then returned to the University of Warsaw and obtained a doctorate in 1927 for his work on Charles Fourier. Because his father gave him part of his estate in Grabkowo in the spring of 1927. He completed several months of gardening practices, among others was Jean Dybowski in Puławy.

In November 1927, he married Zofia Wojciechowska who was a painter and daughter of the President of Poland Stanisław Wojciechowski and First Lady Maria Wojciechowska. After their marriage, they settled in a house built for them by his father in Grabków, where they lived until their death. From 1927 to 1929, Grabski worked at the Economic Office of the National Bank of Poland. In 1929, he was diagnosed with Advanced Pulmonary Tuberculosis. After long-term treatment in sanatoriums in Zakopane, Vienna Woods and Davos he returned to Grabków, but the consequences of the disease were to accompany him for the rest of his life. Since then, he devoted himself to writing and journalism.

He was associated with the national movement. He did journalism in the magazines such as the ABC daily and the Prosto z mostu artistic and literary weekly edited by the national activist and journalist Stanisław Piasecki with whom he was friends with. Through him, he made contact with Bolesław Piasecki and the emerging National Radical Camp. He was among the people who signed the Principles of the National Radical Program in 1937, but soon became discouraged as a result of this movement joining the sanation Obóz Zjednoczenia Narodowego (OZN), as well as their radical anti-Semitism, which he expressed by publishing a poem in 1937 entitled Przytyk pogrom. From 1938, he was a member of the Trade Union of Polish Writers. At that time, he began studies in Paris on the history of Western Slavs in the early days of Poland and the Middle Ages, which he used in his later work.

He participated in the September campaign as a volunteer in the Chełm Regiment Zborny, he took part in the Battle of Tomaszów Lubelski. Together with his regiment, he was surrounded by the Red Army near Kamionka Strumiłłowa on the bug. He managed to return to Grabków on October 17, after taking off his uniform. During the occupation, he was a member of the Home Army for the Polish Underground State. He also hid Jews and survived the war with his family in Grabków.

In March 1945, he was persuaded by Edward Ochab, who was then the government's representative for the Regained Territories, to become his scientific adviser. This work, which at Grabski's request was not related to remuneration, continued in the newly created Ministry of Regained Territories. He wrote the brochure distributed to displaced persons Poland on the Oder, Neisse and Pasłęka and prepared a historical guide of the history of the cities of Western lands titled 200 cities return to Poland in 1947, in which his father-in-law helped the author.

In 1948, he left the ministry in protest against the position represented by the authorities against the so-called native people. Cardinal August Hlond appointed him to the Primate's Council for the Reconstruction of Warsaw Churches, where he led the propaganda section and wrote the text for the album Churches of Warsaw in Reconstruction, which, however, was granted censorship permission for printing only in 1956. He also published in Tygodnik Warszawski and Tygodnik Powszechny.

From the end of 1950, the censorship "record" began to apply to him, which in practice deprived him of the possibility of publishing. The harassment also extended to his sons. In June 1955, a peer court of the Union of Polish Writers deleted him from the list of members for writing an unpublished Catholic Ballade, which was impressed by Konstanty Ildefons Gałczyński, with whom he had been friends since the time of cooperation with Prosto z Mostu. In support of the ruling, it was stated that the ideological atmosphere of the song was "deeply contradictory to humanistic ideas" in force in the Związek Literatów Polskich (ZLP) and "works to violate the patriotic unity of our nation". Fearful of a search at home, he destroyed several manuscripts, including most of the already completed novel Cale God. Her remaining fragment was published in 1961 in the short story Tartak started. The trial was a great shock for Grabski, traces of which can be found in the introduction to the Scar of Childhood and in the poem To a friend of Ballada, published in the volume of poetry Świat na podararu (1958).

Half a year after the trial, the aftermath of tuberculosis was renewed. During his several months in hospital, the political climate in Poland began to change and in June 1956, the plenum of the Polish People's Party reactivated him as a member, however, he did not see rehabilitation. During his first stay in the Union after a break, in September 1956, at the election meeting of delegates, he advocated for imprisoned Primate Stefan Wyszyński. Later, he held certain functions in the Board of the Association. He was also an active member of the PEN Club. After 1956, he established cooperation with the PAX Publishing Institute, but he was not a member himself, in which he published his subsequent books. He was the first president of the Krąg literary club publishing house . He wrote for the weekly Kierunki and Wrocław Weekly Catholic, published by PAX. In 1967 there was another renewal of the disease and final exclusion from public life. After a two-year stay in the hospital, he returned home for a year and finished work on the Scar of childhood (1971). In August 1970 he was taken to the hospital again, where he died in November 1970, at the age of 68. He is buried in Powązki Cemetery.

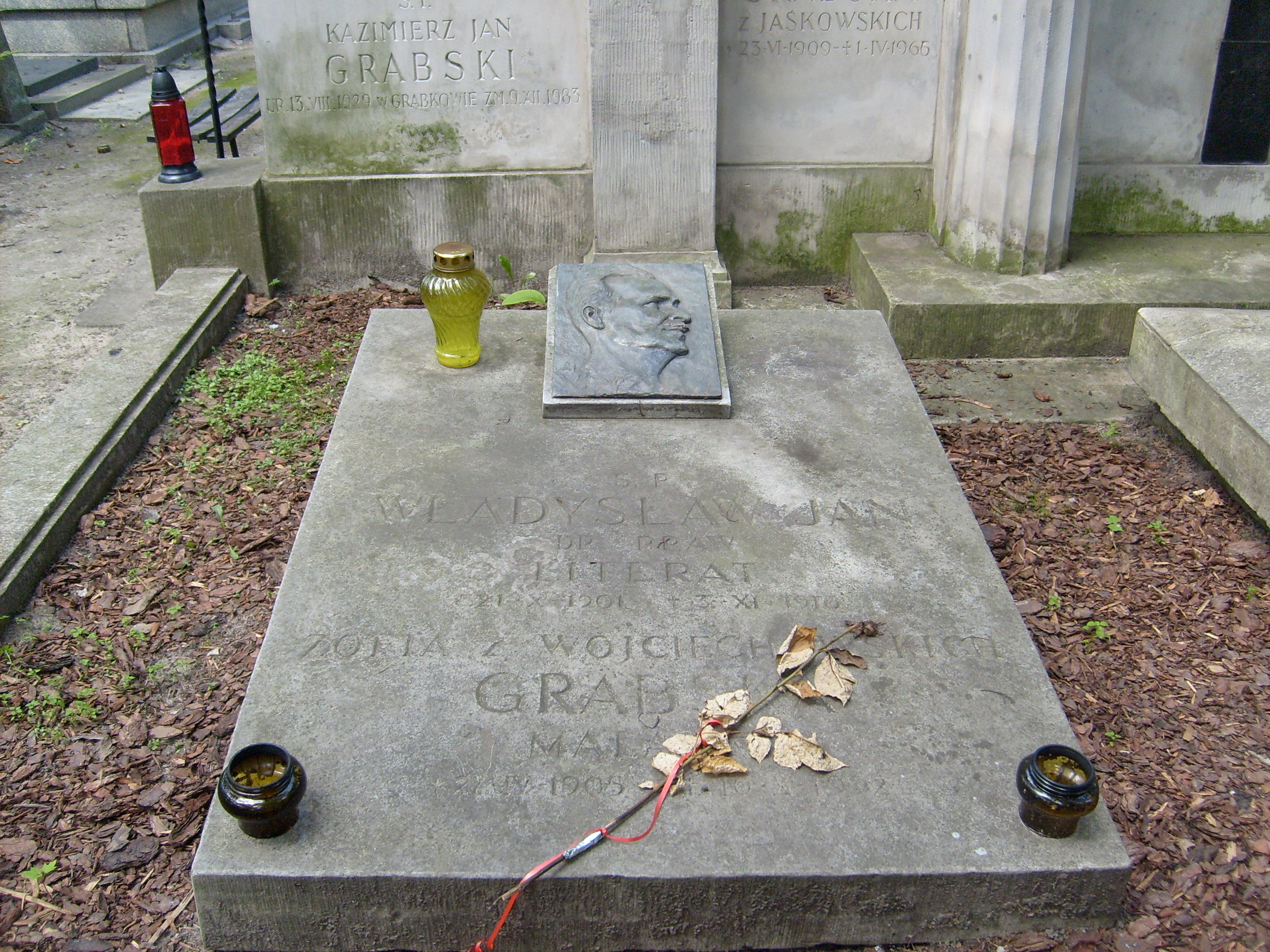
Zofia and Władysław's grave in Powązki Cemetery

== Creativity ==
He made his debut in 1923 with the poetic volume 'Russia. Pictures and thoughts with a poem "created under the influence of the author's experiences during the October Revolution. During his stay in France, he published a volume of sonnets "Three Wreaths" by the Polish Society of Book Friends in Paris. Part of the edition was published in a numbered bibliophile edition illustrated with engravings signed by their authors such as Wacław Zawadowski, Franciszek Prochaska and Konrad Brandel.

The first novel, Brothers, who initiated the three-volume series, presenting critically the political situation in Poland in the period from the assassination of President Narutowicz to the time after the May Revolution. It first appeared in episodes, often confiscated by censorship, in the national daily ABC (1933), and the later (1934) book edition of the Rój Publishing Society was also "decorated" with white pages by censorship. Among other things, a text describing the meeting of President Stanisław Wojciechowski with Józef Piłsudski on the Poniatowski Bridge during the May Coup in 1926. He did not want to publish further volumes of the series swarm for political reasons, but the Poznań Printing and Bookstore of St. Wojciech. In 1935, it appeared in the same publication Lie, and the following year the last volume cycle on the edge. He also wrote several novels in episodes under pseudonyms, including in Dziennik Poznański, the crime story Bloody Traces, and under his own name Rust of life, which, however, he did not later publish in book form due to anti-Semitic accents appearing in it and in the meantime.

In the years 1937–1938, he gave up political issues, and in his work, there was a fundamental shift towards universally understood Christianity. It was opened by the novel In the Shadow of the Collegiate Church, published in 1939, which was reissued many times after the war, and became a representative of Polish Catholic literature. During the occupation, he wrote the historical story of Saga about Jarl Bronisz published in Poznań by the Greater Poland Publishing Bookstore in three volumes, Zrękowiny in Uppsala in (1946) and the Trail of the Vikings and the Year of the Thousand in (1947). During the war, he also began working on the Confessional (1948), which is a continuation of the thread In the shadow of the collegiate church. The next historical novel, Rhapsody of Świdnica, set in the second half of the fourteenth century, during the twilight of the domination of Polish influence in Lower Silesia, was completed in 1953, but it was only granted permission for censorship at the end of 1955 and published in the Pallottinum Publishing House in Poznań. Illustrations for this book were made by wife Zofia.

Grabski published books after 1956 in the PAX Publishing House (Warsaw). The first item was the poetry collection Świat na Podarcji (1958). He prepared a new, revised edition of three hundred cities returned to Poland in 1960, and a small short story Tartak started (1961). Next three contemporary novels appeared were Dominik Pola's Confidential Diary (1963), Moguncka Noc (966) and Blind Start (1966). His last book Childhood Scars, an autobiographical tale brought about by the outbreak of World War I, which appeared in 1971, a few months after the author's death. He did not manage to write another volume of it. He was an avid bibliophile and also an avid photographer which among others, a series of portraits of Witkacy. In 1947, he received the readers' prize of the monthly Odra, and in 1949, he received the Literary Prize of the Polish Episcopate. He also received the Literary Prize of Pietrzak (1956 and 1963) and the Award of the Minister of Culture and Art, Second Degree (1965). He was awarded the Knight's Cross of the Order of Polonia Restituta (1969).

== Family ==
He had four children with his wife: Kazimierz (1929–1983), Maciej Władysław (1934–2016), Agnieszka (1937–2009) and Michał (1941–1986).

== Bibliography ==
- Encyklopedia Katolicka: Wydawnictwo Towarzystwa Naukowego KUL, Lublin, 1993, t. VI, s. 19.
- Biografia Władysława Jana Grabskiego
