= Maria Pasło-Wiśniewska =

Polish politician (born 1959)

member of Sejm 2005-2007
- In office 25 September 2005 – 2007

Personal details
- Born: 27 March 1959 (age 67)
- Party: Civic Platform

Maria Pasło-Wiśniewska (born 27 March 1959 in Szamotuły) is a Polish politician. She was elected to the Sejm on 25 September 2005, getting 7,062 votes in 39 Poznań district as a candidate from the Civic Platform (PO) list. In local elections 2006, she was candidate of PO for mayor of Poznań. She was defeated in her second run by her fellow graduate of the Adam Mickiewicz High School in Poznań and the current mayor—Ryszard Grobelny.

== See also ==
- Members of Polish Sejm 2005-2007
