= 2019 Civic Platform presidential primary =

Polish political primary

| ← 2010 | December 14, 2019 | 2024 → |
- Turnout: 475 electors
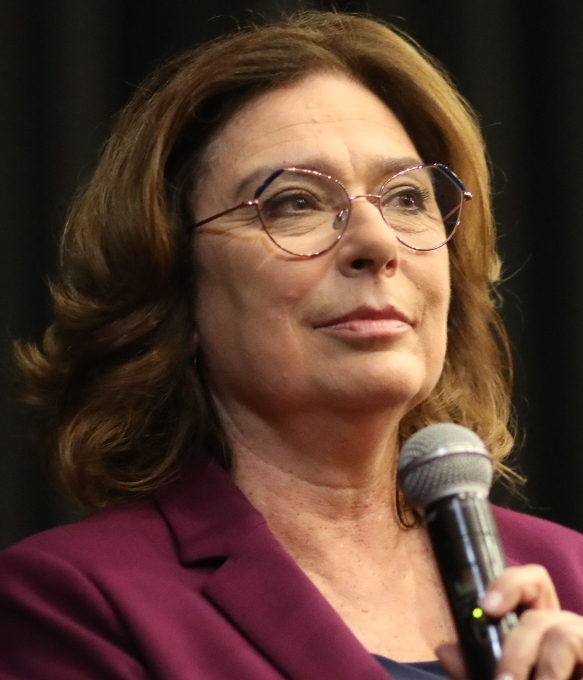

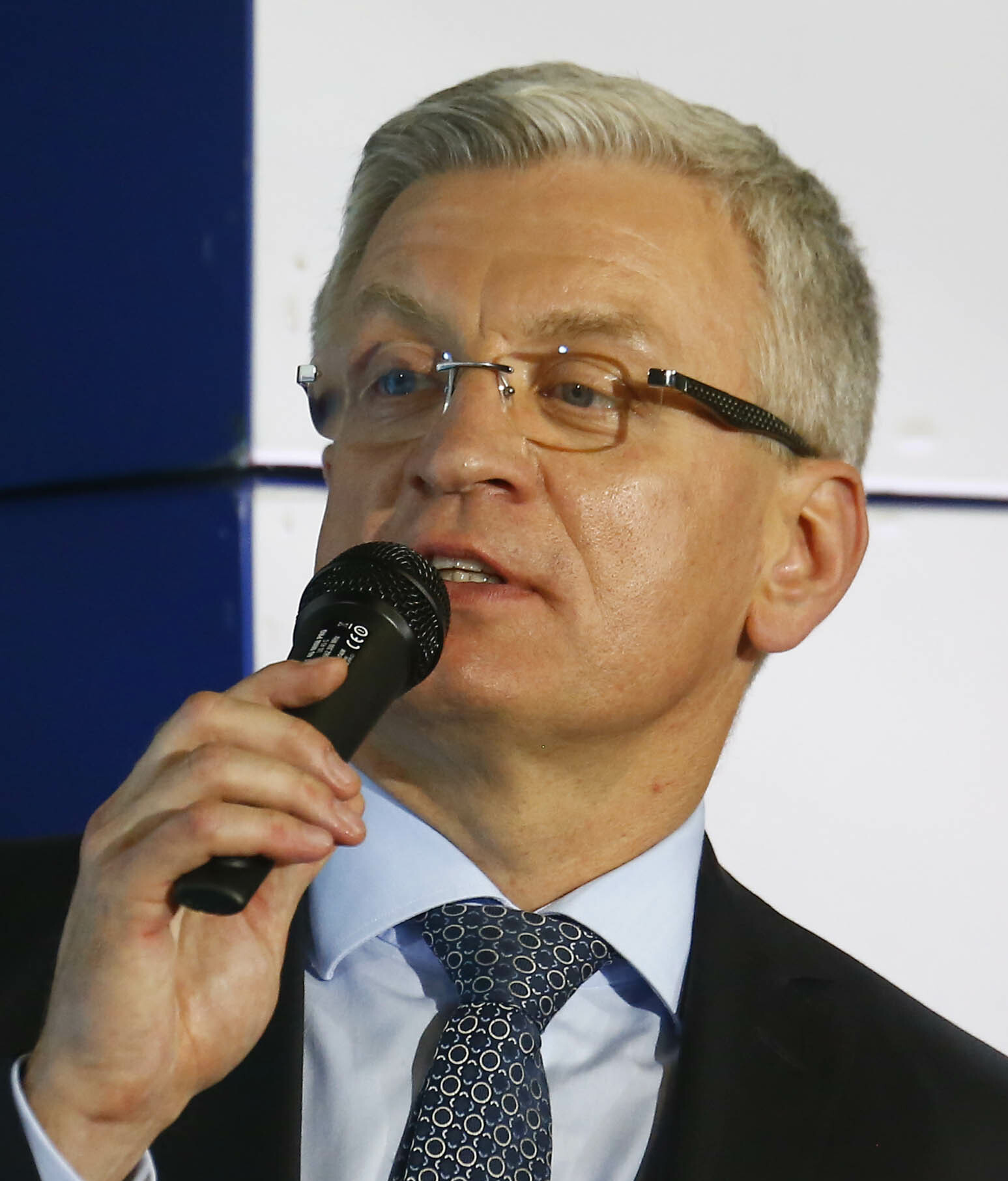
| Nominee | Małgorzata Kidawa-Błońska | Jacek Jaśkowiak |
| Party | PO | PO |
| Popular vote | 345 | 125 |
| Percentage | 73.4% | 26.6% |

The Civic Platform presidential primary, 2020 was the second presidential primary after the 2010 Civic Platform presidential primary. The primary was organized by the party following the decision by Donald Tusk not to run for president again (he lost in a runoff to Lech Kaczyński in 2005). Prior to his withdrawal, Tusk was thought to be the presumptive nominee.

The voting took place during a special conference on December 14.

== Candidates ==
Civic Platform Nominee
| Małgorzata Kidawa-Błońska | Jacek Jaśkowiak |
| Marshal of the Sejm (2015) | Mayor of Poznań (2014–present) |

== Results ==
475 electors cast their votes at the convention. 5 electors cast an empty ballot.

- Małgorzata Kidawa-Błońska: 73.4%
- Jacek Jaśkowiak: 26.6%

== Aftermath ==
After being nominated, Małgorzata Kidawa-Błońska was seen as the main challenger to incumbent Andrzej Duda. However, her campaign failed to gain any traction and she ended up polling below all of the major candidates. Due to the COVID-19 outbreak, the original election was cancelled and the Civic Platform decided to replace her with Rafał Trzaskowski. Trzaskowski ended up losing the election in the second round to Duda.

== See also ==
- 2020 Polish presidential election
