= 2010 Civic Platform presidential primary =

18 March – 27 March 2010	2019 →
- Turnout: 47.47%
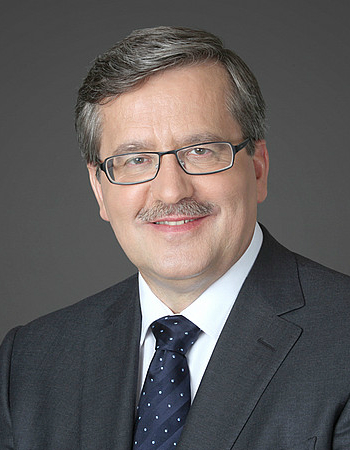

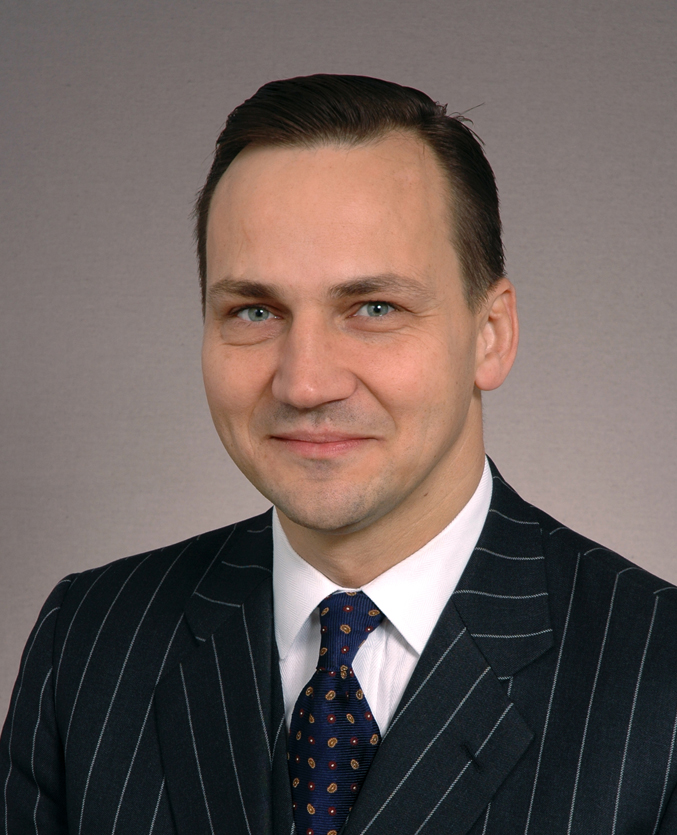
Nominee	Bronisław Komorowski	Radosław Sikorski
Party	PO	PO
Percentage	68.5%	31.5%

The 2010 Civic Platform presidential primary was the first presidential primary open to all party members in Polish history and was held to determine the party's nominee for president in the 2010 Polish presidential election. The primary was organized by the governing centre-right party following the decision by party chairman and Prime Minister Donald Tusk not to run for president again (he lost in a runoff to incumbent Lech Kaczyński in 2005). Prior to his withdrawal, Tusk was thought to be the presumptive nominee.

The vote lasted from March 18 to March 25. Results were announced on March 27.

== Candidates ==
Civic Platform Nominee
Bronisław Komorowski	Radosław Sikorski
Marshal of the Sejm (2007-2010)	Minister of Foreign Affairs (2007–2014)

== Results ==
Turnout was 47.5 percent, or more than 21,000 of the total party members. The vote was conducted entirely through internet and post ballots. Komorowski won handily and went on to win the general election in July over Jarosław Kaczyński.

- Bronisław Komorowski: 68.5%
- Radosław Sikorski: 31.5%

== See also ==
- 2010 Polish presidential election
