= Jam music =

Jam music may refer to:

- Jam band
- Jam session, an impromptu musical performance
- Jam! Music, a Canadian website
