= Dżem =

Polish blues rock band

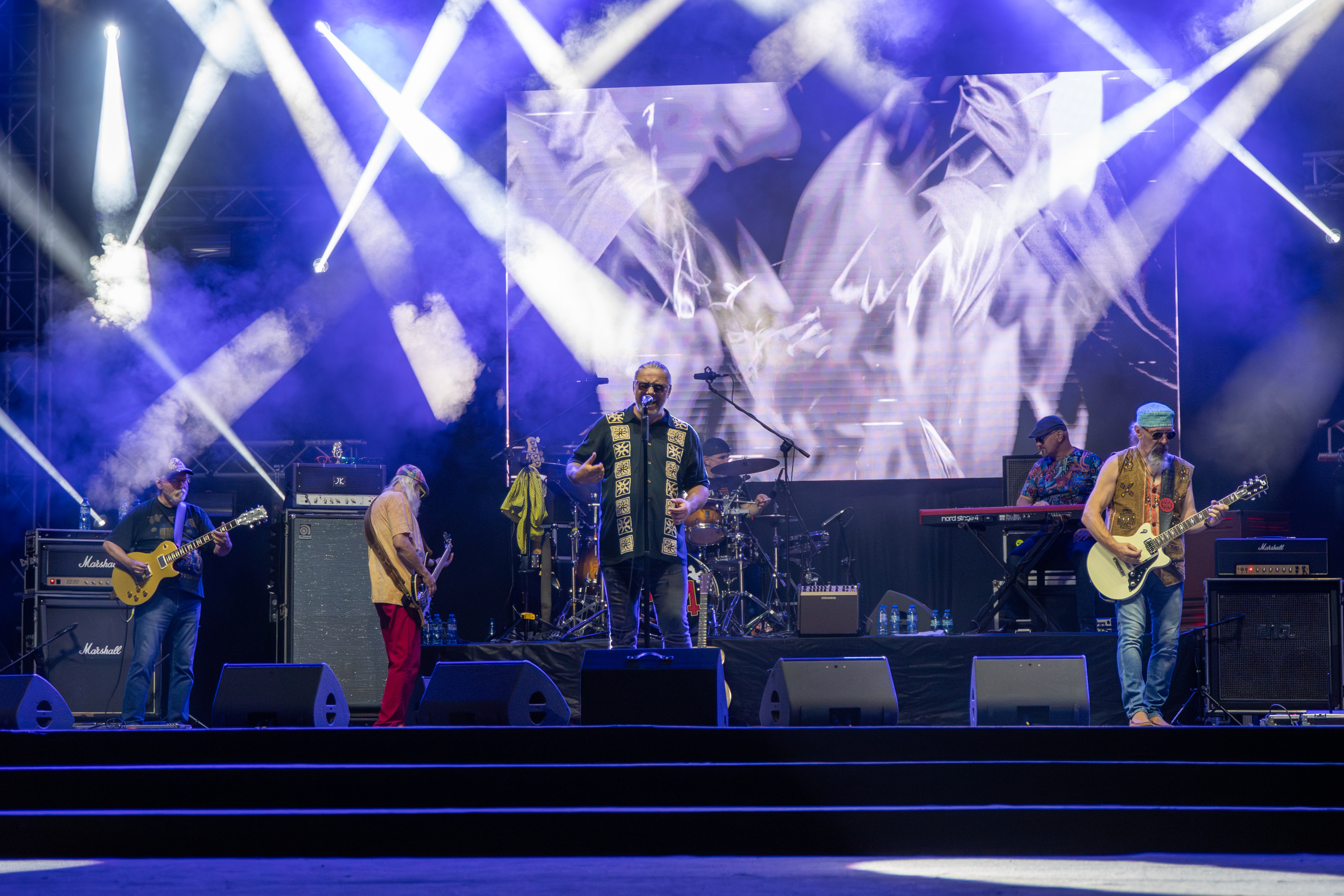
- Concert of Dżem in Sopot, August 2024

Background information
- Origin: Tychy, Poland
- Genres: Blues rock, jam rock, hard rock, acoustic rock
- Years active: 1973–present
- Label: EMI Music Poland
- Website: www.dzem.com.pl

Dżem is a blues rock band formed in Tychy, Poland. Ryszard Riedel, one of the most famous vocalists from Poland, worked with the band. Their songs include: "Czerwony jak cegła" (Red as a Brick), "Whisky", "Wehikuł czasu" (Time Machine), "Sen o Victorii" (Dream about Victoria), "Harley mój" (My Harley), "Mała aleja róż" (Little Rose Avenue), "Naiwne pytania" (Sappy questions), "List do M." (Letter to M.) and many more. They were the back-up band for Eric Clapton's concert in Gdynia on 14 August 2008.

== Name ==
The band's name comes from English word jam session which has the same spelling pronunciation as the Polish word for "jam" in the sense of a fruit preserve. The band's original name was "Jam" but before one of their concerts a woman made a mistake when she wrote their name, writing "Dżem".

== Band members ==
=== Current line-up ===
- Adam Otręba – guitars, vocals (1973–present)
- Benedykt "Beno" Otręba – bass guitar, vocals (1973–1976, 1980–present)
- Jerzy Styczyński – guitars (1979-1981, 1981–present)
- Zbigniew Szczerbiński – drums (1992–present)
- Janusz Borzucki – keyboards (2005–present)
- Sebastian Riedel – vocals (2024–present)

=== Former members ===
- Paweł Berger (deceased) – keyboards, vocals (1973–2005)
- Ryszard Riedel (deceased) – vocals (1973–1994)
- Aleksander Wojtasiak (deceased) - drums (1973-1973)
- Wojciech "Kafar" Grabiński - drums (1974)
- Leszek Faliński (deceased) – drums (1975–1980)
- Andrzej Urny (deceased) - guitars (1981)
- Józef Adamiec – bass guitar (1976–1978)
- Tadeusz Faliński (deceased) – bass guitar (1978–1980)
- Michał Giercuszkiewicz – drums (1981–1986)
- Krzysztof Przybyłowicz - drums (1986-1987)
- Marek Kapłon – drums (1987–1991)
- Jerzy Piotrowski – drums (1991–1992)
- Jacek Dewódzki – vocals (1995–2001)
- Maciej Balcar – vocals (2001–2024)

== Discography ==
=== Studio albums ===
Title	Album details	Peak chart positions	Sales	Certifications
Title	Album details	POL	Sales	Certifications
Cegła	Released: October 31, 1985; Label: Polskie Nagrania Muza; Formats: LP, CD, CS	—		
Zemsta nietoperzy	Released: March 31, 1987; Label: Pronit; Formats: LP, CD, CS, digital download	—		
Numero uno (with Tadeusz Nalepa)	Released: November 10, 1988; Label: Polskie Nagrania Muza; Formats: LP, CD, CS	—		
Najemnik	Released: May 31, 1989; Label: Atomica; Formats: LP, CD, CS, digital download	24		
The Band Plays On...	Released: August 31, 1989; Label: Polton; Formats: LP, CD, CS, digital download	—		
Dżem session 1	Released: October 25, 1990; Label: Polmarket; Formats: CD	—		
Detox	Released: June 7, 1991; Label: Asta; Formats: LP, CD, CS, digital download	18		
Ciśnienie (with Sławek Wierzcholski)	Released: April 28, 1993; Label: Bass Records; Formats: CD	—		
Autsajder	Released: December 15, 1993; Label: Dżem S.C.; Formats: CD, digital download	—		
Akustycznie	Released: August 22, 1994; Label: Box Music; Formats: CD, digital download	—		
Akustycznie – suplement	Released: December 19, 1994; Label: Box Music; Formats: CD, digital download	—		
Kilka zdartych płyt	Released: March 31, 1995; Label: Box Music; Formats: CD, digital download	—		
Pod wiatr	Released: September 15, 1997; Label: Box Music; Formats: CD	—		
Być albo mieć	Released: May 12, 2000; Label: Box Music; Formats: CD	—		
2004	Released: August 30, 2004; Label: Pomaton EMI; Formats: CD	4		
Muza	Released: November 16, 2010; Label: EMI; Formats: CD, digital download	1	POL: 30,000+	POL: Platinum
"—" denotes a recording that did not chart or was not released in that territory.

=== Live albums ===
Title	Album details	Peak chart positions	Sales	Certifications
Title	Album details	POL	Sales	Certifications
Dzień, w którym pękło niebo	Released: May 31, 1985; Label: Karolina; Formats: LP, CD, CS, digital download	–		
Absolutely Live	Released: October 1, 1986; Label: PolJazz; Formats: LP, CD, CS, digital download	–		
Lunatycy – czyli tzw. przeboje całkiem Live	Released: April 1988; Label: Muza; Formats: CD, digital download	–		
Wehikuł czasu – Spodek '92	Released: October 1992; Label: Asta AS; Formats: CD, digital download	–		
List do R. na 12 głosów	Released: December 11, 1995; Label: Asta; Formats: CD	–		
Dżem w Operze cz. 1	Released: June 1, 1998; Label: Box Music; Formats: CD	–		
Dżem w Operze cz. 2	Released: April 26, 1999; Label: Box Music; Formats: CD	–		
Pamięci Pawła Bergera	Released: January 29, 2007; Label: EMI; Formats: CD, digital download	9	POL: 15,000+	POL: Gold
Rawa Blues 1987 (featuring Dżem)	Released: June 18, 2007; Label: Metal Mind Productions; Formats: CD	–		
Przystanek Woodstock	Released: July 20, 2009; Label: Złoty Melon; Formats: CD	–		
Przystanek Woodstock 2003	Released: July 20, 2009; Label: Złoty Melon; Formats: CD+DVD	48		
Przystanek Woodstock 2004	Released: July 20, 2009; Label: Złoty Melon; Formats: CD+DVD	47		
Przystanek Woodstock 2003 i 2004	Released: 2009; Label: Złoty Melon; Formats: CD+DVD	15		
30 urodziny	Released: March 29, 2010; Label: Pomaton EMI; Formats: DVD+CD, digital download	15	POL: 10,000+	POL: 2× Platinum
Symfonicznie	Released: October 5, 2012; Label: EMI Music Poland; Formats: DVD+CD, Blu-ray+CD, digital download	27		
"—" denotes a recording that did not chart or was not released in that territory.

=== Compilation albums ===
Title	Album details	Peak chart positions
Title	Album details	POL
Urodziny	Released: June 24, 1989; Label: Agencja Impresaryjna Aktorów; Formats: CS	–
The Singles	Released: January 1992; Label: Sonic; Formats: CD, digital download	1
14 urodziny	Released: October 1993; Label: Dum Dum Records; Formats: CS	–
Złota kolekcja: Złoty paw	Released: March 29, 2004; Label: Pomaton EMI; Formats: CD, digital download	1
Skazany na Bluesa (soundtrack)	Released: November 7, 2005; Label: ITI; Formats: CD	–
Gwiazdy polskiej muzyki lat 80.	Released: July 31, 2007; Label: TMM, Planeta Marketing; Formats: CD	–
Gwiazdy polskiej muzyki lat 80. – vol. 2	Released: November 6, 2007; Label: TMM, Planeta Marketing; Formats: CD	–
Złota kolekcja	Released: April 3, 2012; Label: EMI Music Poland; Formats: CD	1
"—" denotes a recording that did not chart or was not released in that territory.

=== Video albums ===
Title	Video details	Sales	Certifications
Dżem w Operze	Released: 1999; Label: Box Music; Formats: VHS		
Przystanek Woodstock 2003	Released: 15 kwietnia 2004; Label: Złoty Melon; Formats: DVD	POL: 10,000+	POL: Platinum
Przystanek Woodstock 2004	Released: June 18, 2005; Label: Złoty Melon; Formats: DVD	POL: 10,000+	POL: Platinum
Przystanek Woodstock 2003 i 2004	Released: 2006; Label: Złoty Melon; Formats: DVD		
Dżem 1979-1994	Released: August 10, 2011; Label: Telewizja Polska S.A.; Formats: DVD		

== Filmography ==
Title	Year	Notes
"Dżem"	1994	documentary, directed by Petro Aleksowski
"Sen o Victorii"	1994	documentary, directed by Tomasz Nowak and Anna Szymanek
"Sie macie ludzie"	2004	documentary, directed by Krzysztof Magowski
"Skazany na bluesa"	2005	biographical, directed by Jan Kidawa-Błoński
