= Zofia Wojciechowska-Grabska =

Polish painter (1905-1992)

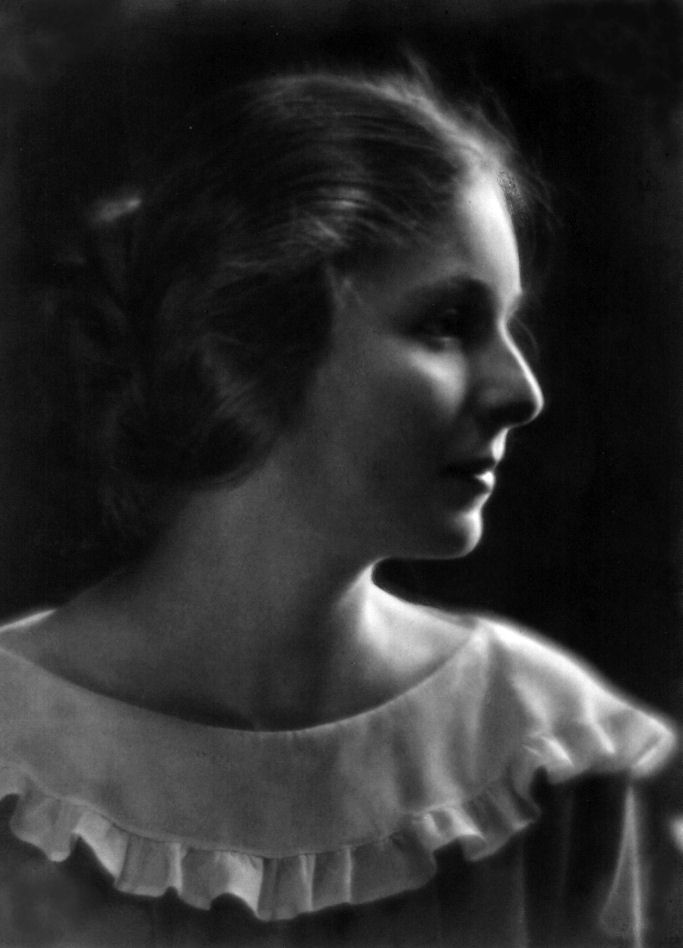
- Wojciechowska-Grabska in 1927
- Born: Zofia Wojciechowska; April 27, 1905; Bethnal Green, London, England
- Died: 4 October 1992 (aged 87); Warsaw, Poland
- Education: Academy of Fine Arts in Warsaw
- Known for: Painting
- Movement: Religious art Still life
- Spouse: Władysław Jan Grabski (m. 1927 d. 1970)
- Children: 4, including Maciej
- Parent(s): Stanisław Wojciechowski; Maria Kiersnowska

Zofia Wojciechowska-Grabska (April 27, 1905 – October 10, 1992) was a Polish painter. She was the daughter of President of Poland Stanisław Wojciechowski and First Lady Maria Wojciechowska.

== Biography ==
She graduated from the Female State Junior High School J. Słowacki in Warsaw in 1924, while learning painting and drawing with Tadeusz Marczewski. In the same year, she took up studies at the Academy of Fine Arts in Warsaw under the supervision of Tadeusz Pruszkowski. She graduated in 1930 after a break related to maternity leave and her husband's illness. She stayed in touch with the Brotherhood of Saint. Łukasz.

She was a member of Association of Polish Artists and Designers (ZPAP). She practised portraits and wall painting, but the mainstream of her work was traditional religious painting. She left about 100, usually unsigned, paintings in Polish churches, including twenty in Warsaw churches. She also drew numerous charcoal portraits, including illustrations for her husband's novel Rapsodia Świdnicka (1955).

== Family life ==
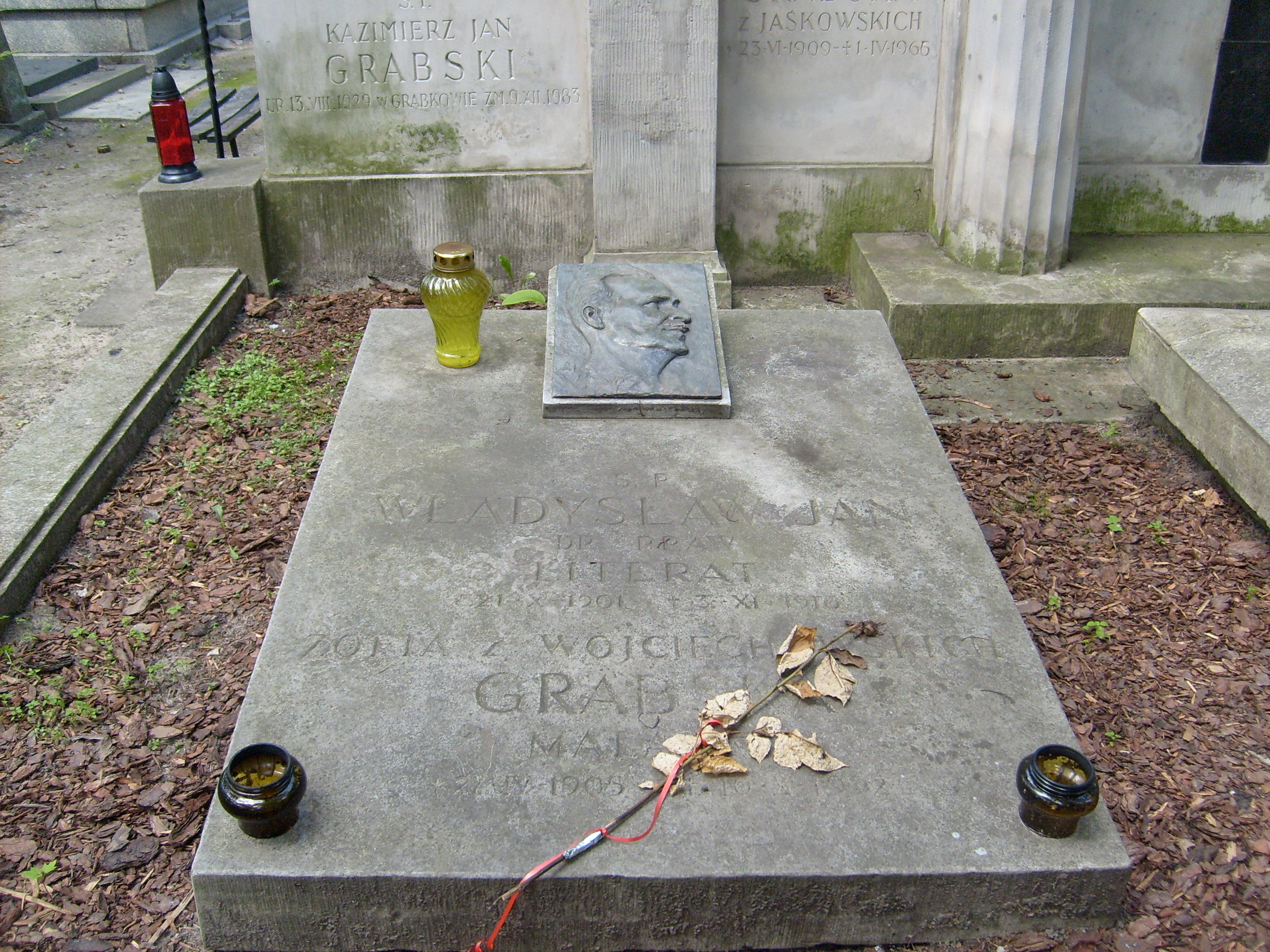
Zofia and Władysław's grave in Powązki Cemetery

In 1927, she married the writer Władysław Jan Grabski, son of three times Polish Prime Minister Władysław Grabski. They had four children, Kazimierz (1929–1983), Maciej Władysław (1934–2016), Agnieszka (1937–2009) and Michał (1941–1986). Her son Maciej is the father of the 2020 Civic Platform candidate for President, Małgorzata Kidawa-Błońska. She is buried next to her husband in Powązki Cemetery.

== Bibliography ==
- Artyści plastycy okręgu warszawskiego ZPAP 1945-1970. Słownik biograficzny. Warszawa: Okręg Warszawski ZPAP. 1972.

article translated based on the corresponding article in the Polish Wikipedia pl:Zofia Wojciechowska-Grabska
