= Ryszard Grobelny =

Polish politician

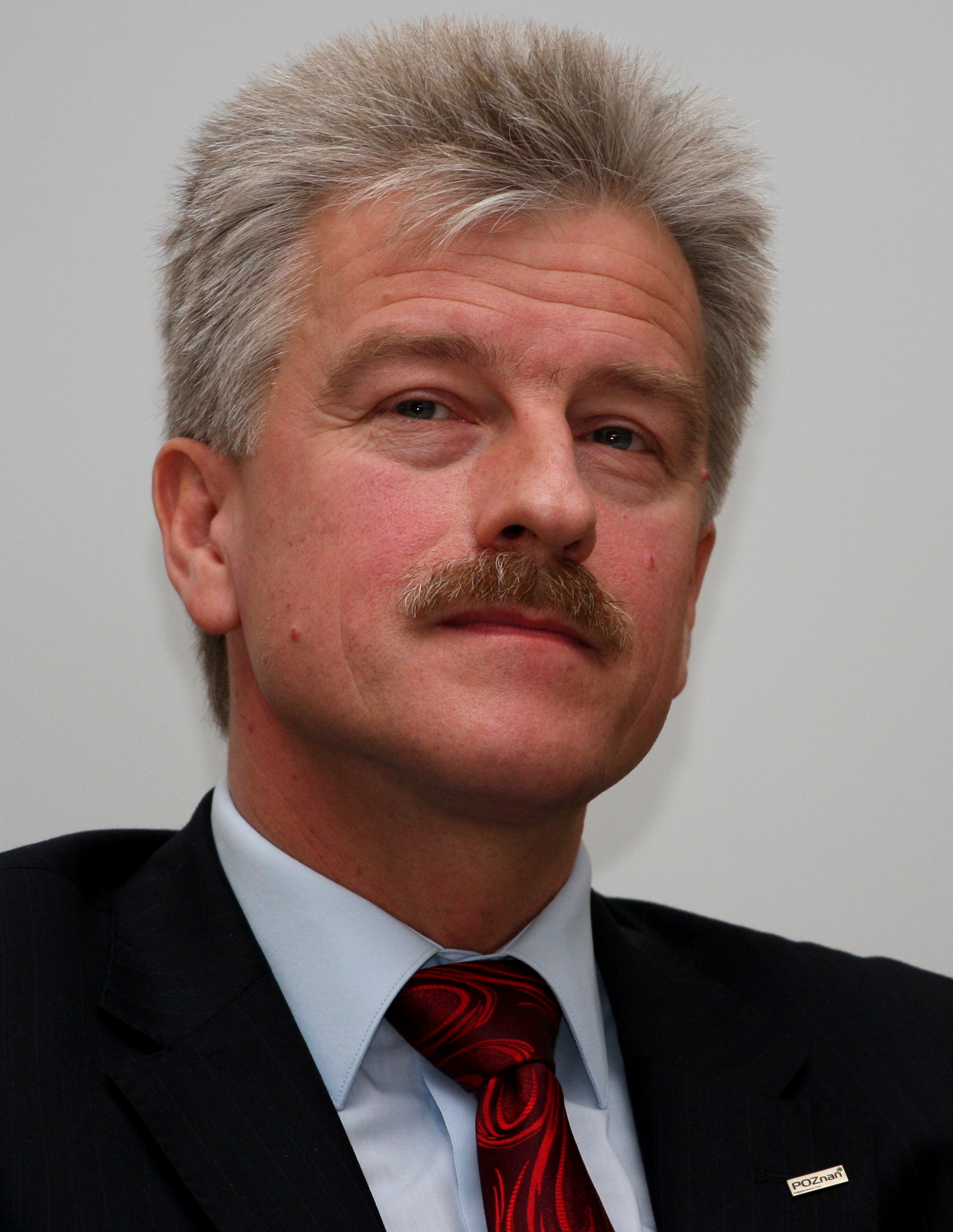
- Ryszard Grobelny in 2010

Mayor of Poznań
- In office 14 December 1998 – 8 December 2014
- Preceded by: Wojciech Szczęsny Kaczmarek
- Succeeded by: Jacek Jaśkowiak

Personal details
- Born: 17 April 1963 (age 63) Poznań, Poland
- Spouse: Ewa Siwicka
- Profession: politician, economist

Ryszard Grobelny (born 17 April 1963 in Poznań) is a Polish politician and economist, who was the Mayor of Poznań, Greater Poland Voivodeship, Poland from 1998 to 2014).

== Life and career ==
He attended primary school no. 71 with a sporting profile, and followed on to the Adam Mickiewicz high school no. VIII. In 1982, he began his studies at the Academy of Economics in Poznań in the faculty of Planning and Financing of National Economy. After the first year of his higher education, he was transferred to the programme of individual studies, which included local government finances and the application of Mathematics in the economy. During his period at the academy he was awarded the scholarship of the Ministry of National Education three times.

In 1987, he graduated, with an MA dissertation on "The independent national councils of local level and local government planning. Analysis of legal regulations and practice in the selected towns and communes of Poznań region". He defended his thesis with distinction and the Summa Cum Laude medal awarded to the best students of economic academies in Poland. His first job was a research position at the Adam Mickiewicz University in Poznań, in the faculty of Social-Economic Geography and Spatial Planning. He continued with his previous research on the local government financing policies and their impact on the regional planning in towns and communities. He is the author of publications in this area of research. At the same time, he taught courses on the application of information technology in geography, regional planning, and the planning of towns and rural areas. Currently he teaches higher education courses on local government finances and municipal economics.

Mr Grobelny began his work as a consultant almost immediately after his graduation. He prepared expert opinions on the valuation of companies and their reorganisation strategies. In 1990-2002 he became a councillor of the Poznań Municipality; in the first term from the recommendation of the Citizens' Committees, then from the Self-governing Wielkopolska and the Union of Freedom. At the same time, in his first term, he became a delegate of the local government for Poznań region and a founding member of the Wielkopolska Local Government Educational and Research Centre in Poznań, the association which now affiliates 242 communes and 32 micro-regions. Mr Grobelny is a teacher, an educator and a consultant offering his services to local government bodies. In 1990-1992 he was a chairman of the Finance Committee at the Poznań City Council and in 1992-1998 he became a member of City Council Board of Managers.

== Elections ==
In 1998, Mr Grobelny was elected the Mayor of Poznań and again he was re-elected in November 2002 and 2006. In 2010, he began his fourth term in office. In 2014 he lost in the local elections with Jacek Jaśkowiak, after serving as the mayor of Poznań for sixteen years.

Since 2002, Mr Grobelny has been a member of the management board for the Foundation for Polish Metropolis Union. In March 2011 he became for the third time the President of the Polish Cities Association.

He is a member of the local government and the council, where he is a co-chairman of the team for the public finance system. Since 2004 he has been a member of the monitoring committee National Development Plan for 2004-2006 and a sub-committee for regional politics. He is also a chairman of the Poznań Council Foundation- Ille-et-Vilaine and the Foundation for the Malta International Theatre Festival. Since 2006, Mr. Grobelny has also been a member of the committee of experts working under the slogan "Share your Meal", dealing with the problem of undernourished children in Poland.

== Awards ==
- Gold Cross of Merit, Grzegorz Pałka Local Council Award (2005)
- Knight's Cross of the Order of Polonia Restituta (2010)
- Officer's Cross of the Order of Merit of the Republic of Hungary conferred by the President of Hungary Pál Schmitt for his outstanding contributions to fostering Polish – Hungarian relations (2012)
- Order of Orange-Nassau (2014)

== Personal life ==
He married Ewa Siwicka, a presenter at TVP in Poznań, and has two children: daughter Karolina and son Paweł.
