= Andrzej Feliks Grabski =

Polish historian and medievalist

Andrzej Feliks Grabski (13 September 1934 in Warsaw – 26 June 2000 in Łodź) was a Polish historian and medievalist.

He was the son of Andrzej Kazimierz Grabski. His grandfather was Władysław Grabski. He graduated from the University of Łódź in 1955.

== Books ==
- Polska sztuka wojenna w okresie wczesnofeudalnym, Warszawa: Wydawnictwo Ministerstwa Obrony Narodowej 1959.
- Bolesław Chrobry. Zarys dziejów politycznych i wojskowych, Warszawa: Wydawnictwo Ministerstwa Obrony Narodowej 1964.
- Polska w opiniach obcych X-XIII w., Warszawa: Państwowe Wydawnictwo Naukowe 1964.
- Bolesław Krzywousty, Warszawa: Wydawnictwo Ministerstwa Obrony Narodowej 1968.
- Polska w opiniach Europy Zachodniej XIV–XV w., Warszawa: Państwowe Wydawnictwo Naukowe 1968.
- Orientacje polskiej myśli historycznej. Studia i rozważania, Warszawa: Państwowe Wydawnictwo Naukowe 1972.
- Mieszko I ok. 930-992, Warszawa: Wydawnictwo Ministerstwa Obrony Narodowej 1973.

== Bibliography ==
- Sławomir Nowinowski, Andrzeja Feliksa Grabskiego żywoty równoległe, "Aparat Represji w Polsce Ludowej 1944-1989" 4 (2007), nr 1 (5), s. 234-269
