= Ryszard Riedel =

Musical artist (1956–1994)

- Born: Ryszard Henryk Riedel; 7 September 1956; Chorzów, Poland
- Died: 30 July 1994 (aged 37) Chorzów, Poland
- Genres: Rock & roll; Blues; Blues rock
- Occupations: Singer-songwriter, lead vocalist
- Instrument: Harmonica
- Years active: 1973–1994
- Website: Official website

Ryszard Henryk Riedel (7 September 1956 – 30 July 1994) was the original lead singer of blues-rock band Dżem (transl. Jam). He is often regarded as one of the most popular and well known Silesian vocalist, along with an occasional collaborator Czesław Niemen. Riedel's legacy is remembered by an annual festival, bearing his name, held in his home town of Chorzów, which was moved from Tychy in 2009. He has become one of the most powerful vocalists of Polish music, similar to Czesław Niemen.

== Biography ==
Ryszard Henryk Riedel was born on 7 September 1956 in Chorzów. He was the second child of Krystyna and Jan Riedel—his sister Małgorzata is one year older. He finished his education after the 7th grade of primary school. He was a self-taught vocalist and he had never attended a singing course. His wide musical influences included bands like Free (Paul Rodgers was Riedel's favourite vocalist), and later, Bad Company, Cream, The Allman Brothers Band, and The Doors. At the beginning of his career he was asked to join Kombi, but he turned down the offer. In December 1973, at the age of 17, he joined Dżem. During the band's initial years he was instrumental in keeping the band together. His lyrics contained many autobiographical pieces, because he used his life as the inspiration for many, if not all, of his songs. Throughout his career he collaborated with many Polish artists such as Rysiek Skibiński, Leszek Winder, and Józef Skrzek, and the band Nocna Zmiana Bluesa, to name a few. In the later years of his singing career he became a heavy drug user (mainly heroin), which led to numerous arguments within the band, and subsequently resulted in Ryszard living his life as an outsider. He skipped rehearsals many times, and even managed to not show up for his concerts. This lifestyle was the inspiration for the 1993 song "Autsajder" (Outsider), in which he states that he will never change: "Ja już nigdy się nie zmienię" Despite his deteriorating health condition, the band continued to collaborate with him until he was forced to attend another failed drug detoxification (detox) campaign in 1994. His last concert with the band "Dżem" was on 16 March 1994 in Kraków.

== Death ==
Riedel's direct cause of death was cardiac insufficiency due to a long time opiate drug abuse – especially a type of crude-prepared heroin known as "kompot".

== Legacy ==
Rysiek (diminutive of Ryszard) Riedel is celebrated as one of the best all-time singers in Polish musical history. The Rolling Stone magazine has described him as "the last hippie of our time".

== Musical events ==
- "List Do R" (29 July 1995, a year after his death) – in memoriam show held in Katowice's concert hall Spodek, with many performances of prominent Polish vocalists, including Czesław Niemen. The name is a paraphrase of Ryszard Riedel's song – "List do M." – "A letter to M".
- Festiwal Muzyczny im. Ryśka Riedla „Ku Przestrodze" (1999–2014) – annual festival held in Tychy (until 2008) and later Chorzów. Polish bands, including "Cree" (lead vocals by Sebastian Riedel, Rysiek's son) and band Dżem performed to honor Rysiek's legacy and to promote drug-free lifestyle. In 2015, before 16th edition took place, promoters decided to remove Riedel's name from festival name, as a result of a protest of Riedel's daughter and son against using his name.

== Movies ==
- Dżem (1994) – TV documentary about band from the beginning to the death of Ryszard Riedel
- Sen o Victorii (1994) – TV documentary about life of Ryszard Riedel produced by TVP Łódź, named after Dżem's song
- Sie macie ludzie (2004) – TV documentary about life of Ryszard Riedel, named after typical greeting of Riedel on his shows, informal version of "jak się macie, ludzie" (how do you do, folks)
- Destined for Blues (Skazany na bluesa; 2005) – a biographical film

== Discography ==
- 1983 Krzak'i; Krzak
- 1985 Dżem; Dżem (later editions named as "Dzień, w którym pękło niebo"- the Day the Sky Broke)
- 1985 Cegła (The Brick); Dżem
- 1985 Blues forever; LP of Leszek Winder
- 1986 Absolutely Live; Dżem
- 1987 Zemsta nietoperzy (The Revenge of the Bats); Dżem
- 1988 Lunatycy – czyli tzw. przeboje całkiem Live (The Lunatics or so-called quite light hits); Dżem
- 1988 Ryszard Skibiński – Ostatni koncert (Ryszard Skibiński- the last concert); LP of Ryszard Skibiński
- 1988 Live; LP with Józef Skrzek
- 1989 Urodziny (Birthday {refers to the anniversary of forming the band}); Dżem
- 1989 Najemnik (Soldier of Fortune); Dżem
- 1990 Dżem Session 1; Dżem
- 1991 Detox; Dżem
- 1992 The Singles; Dżem
- 1992 Dzień, w którym pękło niebo (The Day the Sky Broke);Dżem
- 1992 Wehikuł czasu – Spodek '92 (The Time Machine – Spodek [famous Polish concert hall] '92 ); Dżem
- 1993 14 urodziny (14'th Birthday); Dżem
- 1993 Autsajder (The Outsider); Dżem
- 1994 Akustycznie (Acoustically); Dżem
- 2004 Złoty Paw (Golden Peacock); Dżem
- 2005 Paczka+2 (Pack+2); Krzak
- 2006 Live; CD with the band "Kasa Chorych" (Healthcare Fund)
- 2006 Skibiński Winder Super Session
- 2006 Pamięci Skiby Jarocin 1983 (in memory of Skiba, Jarocin 1983 (Polish former big music festival); Krzak
- 2010 30 urodziny (30'th Birthday); Dżem

== See also ==
- Music of Poland
- List of Poles
