= List of proposed state mergers =

Overview of prospective state mergers

This is a list of proposed state mergers, including both current and historical proposals originating from sovereign states or organizations. The entities listed below differ from separatist movements in that they would form as a merger or union of two or more existing states, territories, colonies or other regions, becoming either a federation, confederation or other type of unified sovereign state.

Many mergers throughout history have been involuntary forced annexations often through violent conquest, and those of such type (exceptions being unique examples such as the Indonesian invasion of East Timor where certain Timorese parties welcomed the annexation) will not be counted on this list, since they did not explicitly have the consent of both the conquering and conquered parties. However, personal unions, land purchases, and colonial mergers do qualify for this list.

== Current proposals ==
Proposed state	Component states	Time period	Notes
Europe	European Union; Sometimes included: Andorra; Armenia; Belarus; Central European Free Trade Agreement; European Free Trade Association; Georgia; Monaco; Russia; San Marino; Turkey; Ukraine; United Kingdom	1831–present	Currently advocated for by Democrats 66, DiEM25, NEOS, Volt Europa, and other Eurofederalist parties.
France	France; Wallonia; Sometimes included: Brussels	1880–present	Main articles: Rattachism and 2007–2011 Belgian political crisis Modern-day French politicians such as Jean-Pierre Chevènement, Nicolas Dupont-Aignan, Marine Le Pen, Jean-Luc Mélenchon, Jacques Myard, and Éric Zemmour have all voiced support for Rattachism. Economist Jacques Attali also supports it. Past politicians have also supported it, the most important of which being former President Charles de Gaulle. Walloon politicians who have at some point voiced support for the idea are Robert Collignon, Daniel Ducarme, Claude Eerdekens, and Jean Gol.
Samoa	American Samoa; Independent State of Samoa	1894–present	Proposed unification of the two Samoas.
Canada	Canada; Turks and Caicos Islands	1917–present	The proposed Canadian annexation of the Turks and Caicos Islands has been an ongoing political discussion between the two nations since Canadian Prime Minister Robert Borden first supported the idea in 1917.
Ireland	Northern Ireland; Republic of Ireland	1921–present	Part of the United Ireland movement.
China	People's Republic of China (Mainland China); Republic of China (Taiwan Area); Also included: Hong Kong (SAR of the PRC); Macao (SAR of the PRC)	1949–present	Unification of the territories of the People's Republic of China and the Republic of China is the nominal goal of both governments, which both operate under the One-China policy. However, within the free area of the Republic of China, there is a sizeable movement to formally declare a Taiwanese state, led by the Democratic Progressive Party, which is currently in government.
Greece	Cyprus; Greece; Sometimes included: Akrotiri and Dhekelia	1950–present	Main articles: Enosis, Two-state solution (Cyprus), and Cyprus problem In 2017, the Cypriot Parliament passed a law to allow for the celebration of the 1950 Cypriot enosis referendum in Greek Cypriot government schools.
Korea	Democratic People's Republic of Korea (North Korea); Republic of Korea (South Korea)	1953–present	Korean reunification has been a goal for both Koreas since the 1953 armistice agreement. However, proposed strategies vary between the two Koreas, with both proposing unification under one sociopolitical system while abandoning the other, similar to both the German and Yemeni unifications. In January 2024, the supreme leader of the DPRK, Kim Jong Un called for amending the constitution to remove references to cooperation and unification, as well as defining the territorial boundaries of the DPRK and adding an article designating the Republic of Korea as the most hostile state.
Isratine or Canaan	Israel; Palestine (East Jerusalem, the Gaza Strip, and the West Bank)	1967–present	Also known as the one-state solution, it is a proposed approach to create a bi-national state to resolve the Israeli–Palestinian conflict.
India	Bangladesh; India; Pakistan; Sometimes included: Islamic Republic of Afghanistan	1972–present	The concept of an Indo-Pakistani Confederation advocates for a political confederation consisting of the sovereign states of India and Pakistan as a means of ending bilateral conflicts and promoting common interests in defence, foreign affairs, and cultural and economic development. While this idea does not propose to end the sovereign existence of either nation through reunification, it is aimed to resolve the conflicts afflicting the subcontinent since the partition of India in 1947.
Saint Martin	Saint Martin; Sint Maarten; Sometimes included: Saba; Saint Barthelemy; Sint Eustatius	1990–present	Proposed unification of the island.
Romania	Moldova; Romania; Sometimes included: Gagauzia; Transnistria	1991–present	Due to the Russian Revolution, the Bessarabia Governorate declared secession in 1917 as the Moldavian Democratic Republic and united unconditionally with the Kingdom of Romania in 1918, before the Soviet occupation in 1940. After Moldova gained independence following the dissolution of the Soviet Union, unification of Moldova and Romania has been proposed which is supported by the Moldovan minorities according to polls and the Romanian Government.
Union State	Belarus; Russia; Sometimes included: Abkhazia; South Ossetia; Transnistria	1999–present	Russia and Belarus signed an agreement to form the Union State in 1999 aiming to continue deeper integration, possibly until unification. Belarusian President Alexander Lukashenko has refuted this idea, declaring that any attempt to annex Belarus would result in war.
East African Federation	Burundi; DR Congo; KenyaPuntland; Rwanda; SomaliaSomaliland; South Sudan; Tanzania; Uganda	2004–present	Proposed political union between the eight member states of the East African Community. Federation was proposed in 2004, but in 2016 it was decided that confederation would be the short-term goal. South Sudan, the DR Congo and Somalia are not as integrated as the other five members, as South Sudan only gained independence from the Sudan in 2011, the DR Congo joined the Community in 2022, and Somalia joined the Community in 2023.
Germany	East Belgium / Eupen-Malmedy; Germany	2010–present	Main article: 2007–2011 Belgian political crisis Although over 71,000 people on the Walloon-German border speak German as their first language, the vast majority of Walloons are French speakers. Thus arises the possibility that, if Wallonia had become part of France, the German-speaking towns might have been absorbed by Germany.
South Africa	Lesotho; South Africa; Sometimes included: Eswatini	2010–present	Proposed integration of Lesotho with South Africa.
(ECOWAS) West African Union	Part of the UEMOA: Benin; Burkina Faso; Côte d'Ivoire; Guinea-Bissau; Mali; Niger; Senegal; Togo; Sahrawi Arab Democratic Republic; Part of the WAMZ: Gambia; Ghana; Guinea; Liberia; Nigeria; Sierra Leone	2019–present	Proposed by Ivorian President Alassane Ouattara.
United Turkic States	Azerbaijan; Kazakhstan; Kyrgyzstan; Turkey; Uzbekistan; Sometimes included: Northern Cyprus; Turkmenistan; East Turkestan	2021–present	General Secretary Baghdad Amreyev announced that the Turkic Council aims for a united state overseeing the Turkic world.
Ethiopia	Eritrea; Ethiopia	2023–present	Proposed by Ethiopian Prime Minister Abiy Ahmed.
Federation of Sahel States	Burkina Faso; Mali; Niger	2023–present	Currently a confederation.

== Historical ==
=== Ancient period ===
Proposed state	Components	Time period	Successful?	Notes
Kingdom of Israel	Reuben; Simeon; Levi; Judah; Dan; Naphtali; Gad; Asher; Issachar; Zebulun; Joseph; Benjamin	1047–930 BC	Yes	Twelve Tribes of Israel
Latin League	Alba Longa; Tusculum; Aricia; Lanuvium; Lavinium; Cora; Tibur; Pometia; Ardea	793–338 BC	Yes	Roman–Latin wars Latin War

=== Medieval period ===
Proposed state	Components	Time period	Successful?	Notes
Carolingian Empire	Kingdom of the Franks; Kingdom of the Lombards	800	Yes	Coronation of Charlemagne
Kingdom of Leon	Kingdom of Leon; Kingdom of Asturias	910–924	Yes	Fruela II of Asturias
Georgian Empire	Kingdom of the Iberians; Kingdom of Abkhazia; Kingdom of Kakheti-Hereti; Emirate of Tbilisi	1008–1490	Yes	Under King David the Builder and Queen Tamar the Great, Georgia was a regional power in the Caucasus and flourished culturally.
North Sea Empire	Kingdom of Denmark; Kingdom of Norway; Kingdom of England	1013–1042	Yes	Under Cnut the Great, the country was the second most powerful in Europe after the Holy Roman Empire.
Croatia–Hungary Union	Kingdom of Hungary; Kingdom of Croatia	1102–1526; 1527–1918	Yes	After a brief separation during Ottoman-Hungarian war, the union was restored on the Lands of the Hungarian Crown inner the Habsburg monarchy.
Crown of Castile	Kingdom of Castile; Kingdom of Leon	1230	Yes	Treaty of Benavente
Swiss Confederation	Uri; Schwyz; Unterwalden	1307	Yes	Three cantons formed the initial Confederation in the 1307 Rütlischwur, followed by the 1315 Pact of Brunnen; ten more cantons joined over the life of the Confederacy.
Hungary–Poland Union	Kingdom of Poland; Kingdom of Hungary	1370–1382; 1440–1444	Yes	Personal union between the Kingdom of Hungary and the Kingdom of Poland was achieved twice: under Louis I of Hungary, in 1370–1382, and under Władysław III of Poland in 1440–1444. An earlier union was also accomplished by Wenceslaus III of Bohemia for a few months in 1305, although he was heavily resisted by local nobles in both kingdoms, and gave up the Hungarian crown soon after.
Kalmar Union	Kingdom of Denmark; Kingdom of Norway; Kingdom of Sweden	1397–1523	Yes	The Kalmar Union was a personal union between the Kingdoms of Denmark, Norway, and Sweden. Established in 1397 under the rule of Queen Margaret I, the union aimed to create a single monarch ruling over these three kingdoms.
Dual monarchy of England and France	Kingdom of England; Kingdom of France	1422–1453	Partial	Treaty of Troyes consolidate the English claims to the French throne, but then Treaty of Arras (1435) reject it during Hundred Years' War.

=== Early modern period ===
Proposed state	Components	Time period	Successful?	Notes
Denmark–Norway	Kingdom of Denmark; Kingdom of Norway	1524–1814	Yes	Lasted from the Swedish War of Independence until the Treaty of Kiel.
Kingdom of England	Kingdom of England; Principality of Wales	1542	Yes	Laws in Wales Acts 1535 and 1542
Polish–Lithuanian Commonwealth	Kingdom of Poland; Grand Duchy of Lithuania	1569–1795	Yes	Union of Lublin
Polish–Lithuanian–Muscovite Commonwealth	Polish–Lithuanian Commonwealth; Tsardom of Russia	1574–1658	No	Three Russian tsars were considered candidates for the Polish throne: Ivan IV, Feodor I, and Alexis I, but irreconcilable religious differences made such a union impossible.
Iberian Union	Crown of Castile; Crown of Aragon; Crown of Portugal	1580–1640	Yes	Portugal became part of the realms of the Spanish Habsburg (Casa de Austria) following the death of Henry I of Portugal but resumed its independence 60 years later.
Polish–Swedish union	Polish–Lithuanian Commonwealth (yes) Swedish Empire	1592–1599	Partial	After a brief union during Sigismund III Vasa's reign, the Swedes rebelled against Sigismund and rejected the pretensions of restoring it at the Treaty of Oliva.
Swedish–Lithuanian Union	(yes) Swedish Empire; Grand Duchy of Lithuania	1655–1657	No	Union of Kėdainiai
Polish–Lithuanian–Ruthenian Commonwealth	Polish–Lithuanian Commonwealth; Cossack Hetmanate	1658–1659	No	Treaty of Hadiach
Franco–Spanish Union	Kingdom of France; Spanish Empire	1700–1714	No	War of the Spanish Succession
Kingdom of Great Britain	Kingdom of England; Kingdom of Scotland	1707	Yes	Though having been ruled since 1603 in personal union when James VI, already king of Scotland, succeeded to the English crown, both countries remained separate sovereign nation states until 1707 when the Treaty of Union unified them into a single entity.
Kingdom of Spain	Crown of Castile; Crown of Aragon	1707–1716	Yes	Nueva Planta Decrees
United States	Connecticut; Delaware; Georgia; Maryland; Massachusetts; New Hampshire; New Jersey; New York; North Carolina; Pennsylvania; Rhode Island; South Carolina; Virginia	1775–1788	Yes	Constitution of the United States is ratified by the Thirteen Colonies, replacing the Articles of Confederation and thereby forming a Federal government.
Dutch Republic	Dutch Republic; United Belgian States	1789–1790	No	During the Brabant Revolution, Hendrik van der Noot, Prime Minister of the young Belgian state proposed incorporating the confederation into the Dutch Republic. Later Willem I admitted that his idea to unite the Low Countries under the United Kingdom of the Netherlands was influenced by van der Noot's proposal.
United States	United States; Vermont Republic	1791	Yes	The unrecognized Vermont Republic, which was under dispute between the US states of New Hampshire and New York would join the United States as its 14th state on March 4, 1791.
Hellenic Republic	Ottoman Rumelia; Asia Minor; Aegean Islands; Principality of Moldavia; Principality of Wallachia	1797	No	Explicitly outlined in the Pamphlet of Rigas Feraios and his later work, New Political Constitution of the Inhabitants of Rumeli, Asia Minor, the Islands of the Aegean, and the principalities of Moldavia and Wallachia. He envisioned a pan-Balkan union of Orthodox Christian and Muslim nationalities free from Ottoman rule.

=== 19th century ===
Proposed state	Components	Time period	Successful?	Notes
United Kingdom of Great Britain and Ireland	Kingdom of Great Britain; Kingdom of Ireland	1800	Yes	Acts of Union 1800. Most of Ireland left the union as the Irish Free State in 1922, while Northern Ireland remained part of the United Kingdom.
Northern Confederacy	Connecticut; Massachusetts; New York; New Hampshire; New Jersey; Pennsylvania; Rhode Island; Vermont; Also invited: Lower Canada; New Brunswick; Newfoundland Colony; Nova Scotia; Prince Edward Island; Upper Canada	1804	No	The Northern Confederacy was a conspiracy headed by Senator Timothy Pickering to separate the Northeastern United States and The British Colonies in North America into one Confederation.
United Kingdom of Peru, Chile and Rio de la Plata	United Provinces of the Río de la Plata; Viceroyalty of Peru; Upper Peru; Old Fatherland (Chile)	1810–1816	No	Manuel Belgrano proposed to the Junta of Buenos Aires the project to establish a monarchical government to maintain the territorial integrity of the ex-Viceroyalty of the Río de la Plata (modern Argentina, Uruguay, Paraguay and Bolivia), and also expand that monarchy to modern Chile and Peru (which at the time were in control of Royalists and were considered incapable of independence from Spain by themselves). However, the plan was rejected for chauvinist reasons, as Argentinians did not want to have an Inca, not a Spanish Bourbon, as the proposed King, and also feared being dominated by the Peruvian elites and their reactionary tendencies.
Union between Sweden and Norway	Kingdom of Sweden; Kingdom of Norway	1814–1905	Yes	Treaty of Kiel
United Kingdom of the Netherlands	Sovereign Principality of the United Netherlands; Provisional Government of Belgium (1814)	1815–1839	Yes	Eight Articles of London
Habsburg Italian Confederation	Kingdom of Lombardy–Venetia; Kingdom of Illyria; Papal States; Duchy of Parma, Piacenza and Guastalla; Duchy of Modena and Reggio; Grand Duchy of Tuscany; Kingdom of Sardinia; Kingdom of the Two Sicilies; Duchy of Lucca; Duchy of Massa and Carrara; Principality of Monaco; Republic of San Marino; Republic of Cospaia	1815	No	Klemens von Metternich's proposal for an Italian Confederation at the Congress of Vienna was rejected by Italian nobility and Austrian nobility.
Russo-Polish Union	Russian Empire; Kingdom of Poland	1815–1830 1914–1918	Partial	Constitution of the Kingdom of Poland as a kingdom in personal union with the Tsar of Russia, until Russian complete annexation in a real union after the November Uprising. Again proposed by Tsar Nicholas II in World War I to gain Polish support for the Russian side on the Eastern Front, and maintained by some White Monarchists to gain Polish and Entente support against the Russian Revolution.
German Confederation	Austria; Prussia; Bavaria; Hanover; Saxony; Württemberg; Other German States	1816–1866	Yes	Constitution of the German Confederation
Gran Colombia	United Provinces of New Granada; Second Republic of Venezuela; Real Audiencia of Quito	1819–1831	Yes	Congress of Angostura
Gran Colombia-Dominican unification	Gran Colombia; Republic of Spanish Haiti	1822	No	Proposal of José Núñez de Cáceres and Antonio María Pineda Ayala who were unable to meet Simón Bolívar before the Haitian occupation of Santo Domingo, and thus, Gran Colombia rejected the offer to avoid a war with Haiti.
Republic of Haiti	Haiti; Captaincy General of Santo Domingo	1822–1844	Yes	Haiti annexes the Spanish part of Hispaniola island.
First Mexican Empire	First Mexican Empire; Captaincy General of Guatemala	1821–1823	Yes	Central America was annexed into the First Mexican Empire. After the dissolution of the Empire only Chiapas choose to remain part of Mexico, the rest became the Federal Republic of Central America. Costa Rica in particular was split between inner factions in favor and against the annexation, ending in a Civil War. The pro-Mexican provinces declared membership but were not recognized by the pro-independence provinces.
Federal Republic of Central America	El Salvador; Honduras; Nicaragua; Guatemala; Los Altos; Costa Rica	1823–1841	Yes	Act of Independence of Central America
Costa Rica	Costa Rica; Nicoya	1824	Yes	Annexation of Nicoya
Hispano-American Confederation	Formally invited: Gran Colombia; Peru; Bolivia; First Mexican Empire; Federal Republic of Central America; United Provinces of the Río de la Plata; Chile Not invited, but considered: Paraguay; Haiti; Spanish Empire; Invited, but not considered seriously: Empire of Brazil; United States; British Empire; Dutch Empire	1825–1826	No	Proposed at the Congress of Panama by Simón Bolívar, but rejected by fears of Bolivarian authoritarism and centralism from non-Colombian deputies that suspected a "Colombian Empire" in this project (or just due to enmity and distrust against Simon Bolivar from regional Caudillos and leaders). Also due to differences between supporters of how to do that union (conflicts between federalists, monarchists, liberals, conservatives, etc.).
Federation of the Andes	Gran Colombia; Peru; Bolivia	1826	No	Proposed merger of the countries liberated by Simón Bolivar into a single state.
Peru–Bolivian Confederation	Peru; Bolivia	1836–1839	Yes	Congress of Tacna
Italian United Provinces	Duchy of Parma; Duchy of Modena and Reggio; Grand Duchy of Tuscany; Romagna (part of State of the Church)	1831	Yes	Existed from 5 February (following the popular uprising in Bologna, when the temporal power of the Pope and the Emilian Dukes were declared to be revoked) until 26 April, the day the city of Ancona was taken by the Austrian troops.
Czartoryski's Commonwealth	Polish–Lithuanian–Ruthenian Commonwealth; Bohemia; Slovakia; Hungary; Romania; Illyria	1832–1861	No	The predecessor to the Intermarium project, Prince Czartoryski envisioned a revived Polish–Lithuanian Commonwealth with French, British, and Ottoman support. The plan proved to be futile following the Revolutions of 1848.
Rio Uruguay	Juliana; Riograndense; Uruguay	1836	No	Riograndense forces were financially and (indirectly) militarily supported by the Uruguayan government led by José Fructuoso Rivera. The Uruguayans had the intention of creating a political union with the Riograndense Republic to create a new stronger state. Juliana Republic was founded in 1839 and formed a confederation with Riograndense, but Juliana itself collapsed less than four months after its founding.
United States	United States; Upper Canada	1837–1838	No	Rebellions of 1837–1838. Republicans in Upper Canada pursued annexation by the United States.
Southeastern Federation	Second Republic of Yucatán; State of Tabasco; State of Chiapas	1841–1842	No	The second Republic of Yucatán emerged when the federal pact signed by Yucatán and endorsed in the Constitution of Yucatán of 1825 was broken by the centralist government of Mexico from 1835. In 1841 the state of Tabasco decreed its separation from Mexico and Miguel Barbachano, then governor of Yucatán, sent a commission headed by Justo Sierra O'Reilly to meet with Tabasco authorities to propose the creation of an independent federal republic from Mexico formed by Yucatán, Tabasco and Chiapas. The idea failed when Tabasco rejoined Mexico in 1842.
United States	United States; Republic of Texas	1845–1846	Yes	Texas annexation: Texas was admitted as the 28th state of the United States on 29 December 1845. However, the transfer of power from the Republic to the new state of Texas formally took place on 19 February 1846.
United Kingdom of Ecuador, Peru and Bolivia	Ecuador; Peru; Bolivia	1846	No	Plan by Juan José Flores to reconquer the former Bourbon Crown territories of the Viceroyalty of Peru.
(Papal States) Papal-Italian Confederation	Papal States (Savoy) Kingdom of Sardinia; Duchy of Parma; Duchy of Modena and Reggio; Grand Duchy of Tuscany; Kingdom of the Two Sicilies; Kingdom of Lombardy–Venetia	1848	No	After an initial interest from Pope Pius IX to lead the Italian nobility in a supranational confederation, the proposal from Vincenzo Gioberti was rejected for being Liberal and Nationalist (ideologies condemned by the Catholic social teaching) and specially due to Italian unification movement having a political leadership from Anti-clerical and Freemasonry groups.
Mexican Republic	Second Republic of Yucatán; Mexican Republic	1848	Yes	The Caste War of 1847 would cause the Republic of Yucatán to request military aid from Mexico. This was given on the condition that the Republic (which had broken away from in Mexico in 1841) to rejoin the Mexican Federation.
United Slovenia	Duchy of Carniola; Duchy of Styria; Duchy of Carinthia; Imperial Free City of Trieste; March of Istria; Princely County of Gorizia and Gradisca; Venetian Slovenia; Prekmurje	1848–1851 1868–1871	No	The programme of United Slovenia was first formulated on 17 March 1848 by the Carinthian Slovene priest and political activist Matija Majar, and published on 29 March in the national conservative newspaper Kmetijske in rokodelske novice, edited by Janez Bleiweis. The idea advanced by Majar was elaborated and articulated by the society of Slovenes from Vienna, led at this time by the notable linguist Franz Miklosich, which published their manifesto on 29 April in the Slovene newspaper Novice from Klagenfurt. In the same period, the geographer Peter Kosler issued a map of the Slovene-inhabited areas with ethnic-linguistic lines. Janez Bleiweis presented these demands to the Austrian Emperor's younger brother Archduke John, who had been living among the Slovenes in Maribor for 15 years. The three key points of the programme (the creation of Slovenia as a distinct entity, recognition of Slovene and opposition to joining the German Confederation) were signed as a petition. 51 signed sheets still exist, showing that the programme was well-supported by the masses. The signed petition was presented to the Austrian parliament; however, due to the uprising in Hungary, the Parliament was dissolved before it could even discuss the Slovene issue. The political aspirations of the Slovenes were suppressed by Baron Alexander von Bach's absolutism in 1851, and the Slovene national movement was moved back to an almost purely the cultural field. The programme of United Slovenia, however, remained the common political programme of all currents within the Slovene national movement until World War I, and was gaining power in the period of tabori between 1868 and 1871. After the war and the dissolution of Austria-Hungary, the programme was partially replaced by the idea of integration with other South Slavs in the common country of Yugoslavia.
Confederated States of Plata	Argentine Confederation; Estado Oriental del Uruguay; Paraguay	1850	No	The Confederated States of the Río de la Plata were a State proposal devised by Domingo Faustino Sarmiento in the book Argirópolis or the capital of the confederated states of the Río de la Plata, with its capital on Martín García Island, would be founded. This idea did not prosper due to the historical changes produced by the battle of Caseros in 1852.
Danubian Confederation	Hungary; Transylvania; Vojvodina; Croatia; Slovakia	1850	No	The Hungarian Statesman Lajos Kossuth (1802–1894) attempted at different stages of his exile following the Hungarian War of Independence in 1849 to organize a Danubian Confederation. He intended to accommodate the forces of nationalism within the Danubian basin while preserving Hungary's territorial integrity and replacing Austria's position in the European balance of power
Federation of Central America	El Salvador; Honduras; Nicaragua	1852	Yes	Second attempt at reunification that lasted for less than a month.
Liberia	Republic of Liberia; Republic of Maryland	1857	Yes	Republic of Maryland was officially named Maryland in Liberia during its independence referendum on January 31, 1853.
United Principalities of Moldavia and Wallachia	Principality of Moldavia; Principality of Wallachia	1859	Yes	Unification of Moldavia and Wallachia; becomes Kingdom of Romania in 1881.
United Provinces of Central Italy	Duchy of Parma; Duchy of Modena and Reggio; Grand Duchy of Tuscany; Romagna	1859–1860	Yes	Second Italian War of Independence
Kingdom of Sardinia	Kingdom of Sardinia; United Provinces of Central Italy	1860	Yes	Following a plebiscite in March 1860 where the people of the provinces voted in favour of joining the Kingdom of Sardinia, the United Provinces of Central Italy were formally annexed by Sardinia. This paved the way for the Proclamation of the Kingdom of Italy on March 17, 1861.
Belgium–Netherlands Confederation	Belgium; Netherlands	1860	No	Belgian Prime Minister Charles Rogier proposed a personal union of Belgium and the Netherlands due to fear of French invasion.
Anglo-American union	United Kingdom; United States	1860–1914	No	Numerous prominent transatlantic thinkers proposed a union of the United States and the United Kingdom.
Spanish Empire	Spanish Empire; First Dominican Republic	1861–1865	Yes	In 1861 general Pedro Santana asked Queen Isabella II of Spain to retake control of the Dominican Republic after a period of only 17 years of independence. Spain accepted his proposal and made the country a colony again.
Confederate States of America	State of South Carolina; State of Mississippi; State of Florida; State of Alabama; State of Georgia; State of Louisiana; State of Texas; Commonwealth of Virginia; State of Arkansas; State of North Carolina; State of Tennessee	1861–1865	Yes	American Civil War
Kingdom of Greece	Kingdom of Greece; United States of the Ionian Islands	1864	Yes	Treaty of London (1864)
Kingdom of Prussia	Kingdom of Prussia; Duchy of Schleswig; Duchy of Holstein	1864–1866	Yes	Acquired from Denmark after the Second Schleswig War.
Balkan Federation	Kingdom of Yugoslavia; Principality of Albania; Kingdom of Bulgaria; Kingdom of Greece; British Cyprus; Greater Romania	1865–1948	No	First proposed in 1865. The idea was a response to the diminishing influence of the Ottoman Empire in the region. The idea of a united Balkan peninsula died off in mid 20th century following the Tito–Stalin split.
North German Confederation	Kingdom of Prussia; Kingdom of Saxony; Grand Duchy of Hesse; Duchy of Mecklenburg-Schwerin; Grand Duchy of Mecklenburg-Strelitz; Grand Duchy of Oldenburg; Saxe-Weimar-Eisenach; Duchy of Anhalt; Duchy of Brunswick; Duchy of Saxe-Altenburg; Saxe-Coburg-Gotha; Saxe-Meiningen; Various other small principalities and free cities	1866	Yes	Following the Austro-Prussian War of 1866 and the annexation by Prussia of Austria's northern German ally states, Otto von Bismarck proposed to unify Prussia and its own German ally states into a single Federation. Consequently, the North German Constitution was adopted, with the provision that the southern German minor states could enter into the union when politically feasible.
South German Confederation	Bavaria; Württemberg; Baden; Hesse-Darmstadt	1866	No	Proposed union of the southern German states that was discussed in the mid-19th century. The idea of a confederation emerged in the aftermath of the Austro-Prussian War of 1866, which resulted in the dissolution of the German Confederation and the emergence of the North German Confederation under the leadership of Prussia. The southern German states, including Bavaria, Württemberg, Baden, and Hesse-Darmstadt, were concerned about the growing power of Prussia and the dominance of northern German states in the new confederation. They sought to form their own union, which would allow them to retain their autonomy while also providing for mutual defense and economic cooperation.
Austro-Hungarian Empire	Austria; Hungary	1867–1918	Yes	Unification of Austro-Hungarian Empire
United States	United States; Russian America	1867	Yes	Alaska purchased from the Russian Empire by the United States, became a department and territory before gaining full statehood in 1959.
Liechtenstein	Liechtenstein; Russian America	1867	No	According to Prince Hans-Adam II, the Russian Empire proposed the purchase of Alaska to the Principality of Liechtenstein.
Dominion of Canada	Province of Canada; Province of New Brunswick; Province of Nova Scotia	1867	Yes	Canadian Confederation
Antillean Confederation	Captaincy General of Cuba; Captaincy General of Puerto Rico; Second Dominican Republic	1869–1870	No	Proposed by Ramón Emeterio Betances.
United States	United States; Dominican Republic	1869–1871	No	Proposed United States annexation of Santo Domingo
Dominion of Canada	Dominion of Canada; North-Western Territory; Rupert's Land	1870	Yes	Following the British Crown acquiring the North-Western Territory and Rupert's Land from the Hudson's Bay Company it was transferred to the Dominion of Canada.
German Empire	Lesser Germany: North German Confederation; Kingdom of Bavaria; Kingdom of Württemberg; Grand Duchy of Baden; Grand Duchy of Hesse; Alsace-Lorraine; Greater Germany also included: Austrian Empire	1871	Yes	The German question regarding the competing ideas of "Greater Germany" and "Lesser Germany" (whether or not a united Germany should include the Austrian Empire) was settled with the Austro-Prussian War in 1866, in which Prussia assumed leadership of the various minor German nation states. The Unification of Germany (excluding Austria) was completed after German victory over the French in the Franco-Prussian War.
Dominion of Canada	Dominion of Canada; Colony of British Columbia	1871	Yes	Following a merger of the Colony of British Columbia (1858-1866) and the Colony of Vancouver Island in 1866 the new colony was incorporated into Canadian Confederation in 1871 as the Province of British Columbia.
Austro-Hungarian-Bohemian Empire	Austro-Hungarian Empire; Kingdoms of Bohemia	1871–1918	No	Franz Joseph I of Austria rejected proposals of Austro-Czech Compromise. His successor Karl I of Austria accepted those pretensions of reform in October 1918, shortly before his abdication, but were never implemented due to the Dissolution of Austria-Hungary.
Dominion of Canada	Dominion of Canada; Colony of Prince Edward Island	1873	Yes	Prince Edward Island joined Canadian Confederation partially to gain financial support from the union to avoid bankruptcy.
Bulgaria–Romania	Bulgaria; Romania	1878–1879	No	Proposed personal union, German prince Alexander of Battenberg is elected instead.
United States of Peru–Bolivia	Peru; Bolivia	1880	No	Proposed state by Nicolás de Piérola and Narciso Campero, also called the Federal Republic of the Incas.
Kingdom of Spain	Kingdom of Spain; Captaincy General of the Philippines	1880–1898	No	By the Propaganda Movement led by Filipinos educated in Europe which advocated the Philippine islands be converted from a colony to a province of Spain.
Austro-Hungarian-Croatian Empire	Austro-Hungarian Empire; Croatia (Triune Kingdom)	1880–1918	Partial	Trialism in Austria-Hungary was repeatedly rejected by the Diet of Hungary to preserve the integrity of the Hungarian Crown, and although Karl I of Austria pushed for it in 1918, it was never implemented due to the Dissolution of Austria-Hungary following World War I.
Estonian–Finnish federation	Estonia; Finland	1881–1941	No	The matter was discussed on 8 December 1917, at the Estonian Council of Elders, where Jaan Raamot spoke about the positive attitude of Pehr Evind Svinhufvud, Speaker of the Senate of Finland. In his speech to the Council of Elders, Estonian Politician Konstantin Päts supported the Union and welcomed the idea.
Polynesian Confederation	Kingdom of Fiji; Kingdom of Hawaii; Kingdom of Samoa; Kingdom of Tahiti; Kingdom of Tonga	1882	No	During the period of European colonization, king Kalākaua of Hawaii proposed a Polynesian Confederation.
Principality of Bulgaria	Bulgaria; Autonomous Province of East Rumelia	1885	Yes	After Bulgaria defeated Serbia in the Serbo-Bulgarian War of 1885, Bulgaria nearly doubled in size when East Rumelia was incorporated within its borders. Bulgaria officially annexed it from the Ottoman Empire in 1885.
Bulgaria–Romania	Bulgaria; Romania	1886–1887	No	Proposed personal union, rejected by Carol I of Romania due to Russian pressure.
Dominion of Canada	Dominion of Canada; Jamaica	1890	No	In the late 19th century, there was some discussion of some form of political union between Canada and Jamaica.
Greater Republic of Central America	El Salvador; Honduras; Nicaragua; Considered joining: Costa Rica; Guatemala	1895–1898	Yes	Treaty of Amapala
United States	United States; Hawaii	1898–1959	Yes	Annexation of Hawaii: The Republic of Hawaii would be annexed as a territory of the United States on 7 July 1898. Hawaii would remain a US territory until it was admitted as the 50th state on 21 August 1959.

=== 20th century ===
Proposed state	Components	Time period	Successful?	Notes
Commonwealth of Australia	New South Wales; Queensland; South Australia; Tasmania; Victoria; Western Australia; Also invited: Colony of Fiji; Colony of New Zealand	1901	Yes	Federation of Australia. New Zealand had many disagreements with the Australian government and decided to not join. Fiji also did not join.
Saudi Arabia	Third Saudi State; Jabal Shammar; Kingdom of Hejaz; Sharifian Caliphate; Idrisid Emirate of Asir; Sharifate of Mecca; Sheikdom of Upper Asir; Principality of Najran	1901–1934	Yes	Proclamation of the Kingdom of Saudi Arabia
Oklahoma	Oklahoma Territory; Cherokee Nation; Choctaw Nation; Chickasaw Nation; Muscogee Nation; Seminole Nation	1904–1907	Yes	The Five Civilized Tribes in Indian Territory did not want to unify with Oklahoma, and thus proposed to create a separate state as a means to retain control of their lands and some measure of independence. Their efforts culminated in the State of Sequoyah in 1905, but they failed to gain support in the U.S. Congress. Following annexation, the region was admitted to the union as the State of Oklahoma.
Franco-British Union	France; United Kingdom	1904–1956	No	A Franco-British Union is a concept for a union between the two independent sovereign states of the United Kingdom and France. Such a union was proposed during certain crises of the 20th century; it has some historical precedents. In April 1904 France and the United Kingdom signed a series of agreements, known as the Entente Cordiale, which marked the end of centuries of intermittent conflict between the two powers, and the start of a period of peaceful co-existence. Nationalist political leaders from both sides were uncomfortable with the idea of such a merging.
United States of Greater Austria	Austria (Kingdom of Hungary) Hungary; Croatia; Bohemia; West Galicia; East Galicia; Trentino; Trieste; Carniola; Transylvania; Vojvodina; Slovakia; Székely Land; Bosnia and Herzegovina	1906–1918	No	An unrealised proposal made in 1906 to federalize Austria-Hungary to help resolve widespread ethnic and nationalist tensions. It was conceived by a group of scholars surrounding Archduke Franz Ferdinand of Austria, notably by the ethnic Romanian lawyer and politician Aurel Popovici. However, the Archduke was assassinated at Sarajevo in 1914, triggering the outbreak of the First World War. After the war, Austria-Hungary was dismantled and several new nation-states were created, and various Austro-Hungarian territories were ceded to neighbouring countries at the Paris Peace Conference by the treaties of Saint-Germain-en-Laye and Trianon.
Union of South Africa	Cape Colony; Colony of Natal; Orange River Colony; Transvaal Colony	1909	Yes	Union of South Africa
Dominion of Canada	Dominion of Canada; The Bahamas	1911	No	In 1911, at the request of the Bahamian House of Assembly, the Canadian and the Bahamian governments began serious negotiations for Bahamian accession to the Canadian confederation. However, a racial panic ignited by the migration of over one thousand African-Americans fleeing violence in Oklahoma derailed the discussions. Prime Minister Wilfrid Laurier turned against the idea, citing incompatible "ethnical origin". After Laurier lost the September 1911 federal election, Bahamian Governor William Grey-Wilson travelled to Canada to reopen accession talks with newly elected PM Robert Borden. In a meeting between Grey and Borden on 18 October 1911, Borden rejected the possibility of taking the Bahamas into the Canadian confederation. His reasoning was that the events of the past year had proved that Canadian public opinion would not countenance the admission of a majority-black province. The British Colonial Office concurred: "No doubt for the moment the Dominion government would safeguard their interests, but there are signs of the rise of a colour question in Canada and in any case it cannot be long before U.S. opinion gives the tone to Canada in regard the Negro."
Imperial Federation	United Kingdom; Ireland; Dominion of Canada; Commonwealth of Australia; Dominion of Newfoundland; Dominion of New Zealand; Union of South Africa; India	1911–1937	No	The British Empire was composed of many states with vastly different constitutions and goals to pursue. Groups like the Imperial Federation League advocated for a political union between the territories of the Empire that could establish a "permanent binding force" between them. Each dominion would be guaranteed representation on equal footing with the United Kingdom in an Imperial Parliament. Ireland would also have been presented representation as an alternative to home rule, and it was deemed possible that an autonomous India could one day join as well. First discussed by heads of government at the 1911 Imperial Conference, and for a second time at the 1937 Imperial Conference where it was eventually dismissed.
Kingdom of Greece	Cretan State; Kingdom of Greece	1913	Yes	Crete rebelled against Ottoman rule during the Cretan Revolt of 1866–69 and used the motto "Crete, Enosis, Freedom or Death". The Cretan State was established after the intervention of the Great Powers, and Cretan union with Greece occurred de facto in 1908 and de jure in 1913 by the Treaty of Bucharest.
Austro-Polish Union	Projected: Austro-Hungarian Empire; Kingdom of Poland; Also considered: Western Ukraine	1914–1918	No	Proposals from Trialists to incorporate Russian Poland in the Habsburg empire, unifying them with Austrian Poland and turn them in a Third Crown like Austria and Hungary. Approved by Karl I of Austria in October 1918. Never implemented due to German empire plans over the Kingdom of Poland, and also Central Powers defeat at World War I. Also rejected by Polish nationalists due to some proposals of create an Eastern Galicia Kingdom governed by pro-Habsburg Ukrainian nobility.
Aistija	Latvia; Lithuania	1915–1940	No	During World War I and the Interwar period, many Latvian and Lithuanian scholars, such as Jonas Šliūpas, argued that Latvia and Lithuania should unify as part of the Baltic Entente. This idea was originally proposed by Latvia and supported by Lithuania, especially after losing their capital Vilnius to Poland in the Polish–Soviet War, however it was eventually rejected by Lithuania because they would have to give up their claims on Polish land including Vilnius. The idea was still popular until the Occupation of the Baltic states, when it fell out of favour.
United States of Poland	Kingdom of Poland; Kingdom of Lithuania; Kingdom of Galicia and Lodomeria; Belarusian Democratic Republic	1917	Partial	Ignacy Jan Paderewski
Habsburg Danubian Confederation	Proposed: Crown of Austria (Kingdom of Hungary) Crown of Hungary; Crown of Croatia (Triune Kingdom and Bosnia-Herzegovina); Kingdom of Bohemia; Kingdom of Galicia and Lodomeria; Projected states to incorporate: Kingdom of Poland; Kingdom of Albania; Kingdom of Serbia; Kingdom of Montenegro; Kingdom of Romania; Kingdom of Lithuania; Kingdom of Lombardy–Venetia; Western Ukraine	1917–1918	Partial	Karl I of Austria proposed reforms to Confederate the Habsburg monarchy (based in traditional kingdoms than nation-states) and also the possible incorporation of some Balkan States and Poland (or give Kingdom of Galicia to German puppet- Poland). Most of the Diets approved the proposals of Kaiser Karl I between October–November 1918 to avoid punishment from the Allies of World War I. Never implemented due to Dissolution of Austria-Hungary and also by Josephinists (Austrian Centralists), Pan-Slavist, Serbian irredentist, Czech nationalist, Polish nationalist, Hungarian nobility and Pan-Germanist opposition.
Hungary–Romania	Kingdom of Romania; Republic and Kingdom of Hungary	1917–1920	No	Federation or personal union between the Kingdom of Romania and the Kingdom/Republic of Hungary under one monarch. Proposals were the most active in 1919 and 1920, but they continued to exist up to the Second World War thanks to the regency.
Kingdom of Yugoslavia	Kingdom of Serbia; Kingdom of Montenegro; State of Slovenes, Croats and Serbs; Banat, Bačka and Baranja	1918	Yes	Creation of Yugoslavia
Czechoslovak Republic	Kingdom of Bohemia; Margraviate of Moravia (Czech Silesia) Upper and Lower Silesia; Upper Hungary; Subcarpathian Rus'	1918	Yes	Czechoslovak declaration of independence
Kingdom of Romania	Kingdom of Romania; Moldavian Democratic Republic; Bukovina; Transylvania	1918	Yes	Great Union, Union of Bessarabia with Romania, Union of Bukovina with Romania, Union of Transylvania with Romania
Intermarium	Belarusian People's Republic; Kingdom of Bulgaria; Czechoslovak Republic; Estonia; Finland; Kingdom of Hungary; Latvia; Lithuania; Polish Republic; Kingdom of Romania; Ukrainian People's Republic; Kingdom of Yugoslavia	1918	No	Also called "Międzymorze" in Polish. Suggested shortly after World War I to combat the influences of Germany and Russia.
Transcaucasian Democratic Federative Republic	Democratic Republic of Georgia; Democratic Republic of Armenia; Azerbaijan Democratic Republic	1918	Yes	A short-lived South Caucasian state that extended across what are now the modern-day countries of Georgia, Armenia and Azerbaijan plus parts of Eastern Turkey as well as Russian border areas. The state only lasted for a month before Georgia declared independence, followed shortly by Azerbaijan and Armenia.
Sweden	Sweden; Aland	1918	No	See also: 1919 Ålandic status referendum
Switzerland	Switzerland; Vorarlberg	1918	No	Amidst the chaos in collapse of the Austro-Hungarian empire the Vorarlbergers proclaimed themselves a separate non-Austrian, Germanic people and declared on 3 November 1918 the independence of the Republic of Vorarlberg. The secession was blocked by the Allies and the new Austrian republican government. In April 1919, over 80% of the Vorarlbergers voted to secede from Austria and attach themselves to Switzerland, but they were again blocked.
Weimar Republic	Weimar Republic; Republic of German-Austria	1918–1919	No	Following the disintegration of Austria-Hungary in the final days of World War I the German-speaking territories of the former Austria-Hungary attempted to begin a process of integration into Weimar Germany. The Allies did not favor the idea, and forced the Austrian rump state to sign the Treaty of Saint Germain, which prohibited Austria from uniting with Germany.
(Denmark) Danish–Icelandic Act of Union	Kingdom of Denmark; Kingdom of Iceland	1918–1944	Yes	Danish–Icelandic Act of Union
Ukrainian People's Republic	Ukrainian People's Republic; West Ukrainian People's Republic	1919	Yes	Act Zluky
Federation of Central America	El Salvador; Guatemala; Honduras; Considered joining: Costa Rica; Guatemala	1921–1922	Yes	Formed for the 100th anniversary of Central American independence
Patria Grande	Argentina; Bolivia; Chile; Colombia; Costa Rica; Cuba; Dominican Republic; El Salvador; Ecuador; Guatemala; Honduras; Mexico; Nicaragua; Panama; Paraguay; Peru; Puerto Rico; Uruguay; Venezuela	1922	No	The concept of a shared homeland or community encompassing all of Spanish America, and sometimes all of Latin America and the Caribbean. The term is associated with political ideas of Ibero-American integration, rejecting the balkanization of the Spanish Empire in the Americas that followed the Spanish American wars of independence. The term may be also used to talk specifically about projects of Hispanic American unity held by Simón Bolívar and José de San Martín.
Union of Soviet Socialist Republics	Byelorussian SSR; Russian SFSR; Transcaucasian SFSR; Ukrainian SSR	1922	Yes	Treaty on the Creation of the Union of Soviet Socialist Republics
Union of South Africa	Union of South Africa; Colony of Southern Rhodesia	1922	No	The 1922 Southern Rhodesian government referendum was held in the colony on 27 October 1922. Voters, almost all of them White, were given the options of establishing responsible government or joining the Union of South Africa. After 59% voted in favour of responsible government, it was officially granted on 1 October 1923.
Caucasian Confederation	Democratic Republic of Georgia; Azerbaijan Democratic Republic; Mountainous Republic of the North Caucasus; Projected to incorporate: Democratic Republic of Armenia	1924–1940	No	A Prometheist subproject envisioning a loose union of Caucasus nations with the endorsement of anti-Soviet Caucasian émigrés in Poland, Czechoslovakia, France, and Turkey.
Greater Indonesia	Dutch East Indies; British Malaya; Kingdom of Sarawak; British North Borneo; Protectorate of Brunei; British Singapore; Portuguese Timor	1928	No	A political concept that sought to bring the so-called Malay race together by uniting the territories of Dutch East Indies (and Portuguese Timor) with the British Malaya and British Borneo. It was espoused by students and graduates of Sultan Idris Training College for Malay Teachers in the late 1920s, and individuals from Sumatra and Java including Mohammad Yamin and Sukarno in the 1950s. Indonesia Raya was later adapted as the name of the Indonesian national anthem in 1924.
Baltoscandia	Denmark; Sweden; Finland; Norway; Iceland; Estonia; Lithuania; Latvia	1928–1960	No	The term Baltoscandia was first used by Sten de Geer in an article in "Geografiska Annaler" in 1928 and further developed by Kazys Pakštas. He envisioned Baltoscandia as an economic, political and military unit. Kazys Pakštas proposed that one of the ways for the small nations to withstand the influence coming from the large ones is to unite and to cooperate more closely among each other. As he mentions, unification is possible only among nations that are similar by their size, geographical environment, religion and culture.
Saudi Arabia	Saudi Arabia; Kingdom of Yemen	1934	No	See also: Saudi–Yemeni war (1934)
German Reich	German Reich; Federal State of Austria	1938	Yes	Anschluss
Turkey	Turkey; Hatay State	1939	Yes	On 2 September 1938 the Sanjak of Alexandretta declared itself separate from the French Mandate of Syria and Lebanon, becoming the Hatay State. On 29 June 1939, the legislature voted to merge with Turkey.
Polish–Czechoslovak confederation	Strictest definition: Polish Republic; Czechoslovak Republic; Later expanded to include: Kingdom of Hungary	1939–1948	No	Proposed by Władysław Sikorski. British Foreign Minister Anthony Eden extended the concept to Hungary.
Greek–Yugoslav confederation	Strictest definition: Kingdom of Greece; Kingdom of Yugoslavia; Loosest definition also includes: Albanian Kingdom; Kingdom of Bulgaria; Kingdom of Romania	1941–1944	No	The Greek-Yugoslav confederation was a political concept during World War II, sponsored by the United Kingdom and involving the Greek government-in-exile and the Yugoslav government-in-exile. The two governments signed an agreement pushing the proposal ahead, but it never got beyond the planning stage because of opposition from within the Greek and the Yugoslav governments, real world events, and the opposition of the Soviet Union. The proposal envisioned the creation of a confederation of Greece and Yugoslavia.
Central-Eastern European Union	Central European Union: Polish–Czechoslovak confederation Kingdom of Hungary Balkan Union: Greek–Yugoslav confederation Albanian Kingdom; Kingdom of Bulgaria; Kingdom of Romania	1941–1944	No	The concept of a "Central [and Eastern] European Union"—a triangular geopolitical entity anchored in the Baltic, Black, and Adriatic or Aegean Seas—was revived during World War II in Władysław Sikorski's Polish Government-in-Exile. This concept was backed by the British Foreign Office led by British Foreign Minister Anthony Eden. A first step toward its implementation—1942 discussions among the Greek, Yugoslav, Polish, and Czechoslovak governments-in-exile regarding prospective Greek–Yugoslav and Polish–Czechoslovak federations (with the eventual aim of Hungarian, Romanian, Bulgarian, and Albanian incorporation)—ultimately foundered on Soviet opposition, which led to Czech hesitation and Allied indifference or hostility. A declaration by the Polish Underground State in that period called for the creation of a Central and Eastern European federal union undominated by any one state. On the international scene, the confederation was received favorably by Turkey but opposed by the Soviet Union, as Joseph Stalin saw no need for a strong and independent federation in Europe that could threaten his designs in Eastern Europe.
Soviet Union	Soviet Union; Tuvan People's Republic	1943–1944	Yes	Tuvan underwent intense Russification of social and economic practices, and virtually all remaining opposition to Stalinist policy was eradicated. The Soviets desired the mineral resources of the republic and a permanent end to Mongolian-Chinese geopolitical intrigues in the region. This process culminated in the absorption of Tuva in 1944, under the rule of General Secretary Salchak Toka and his wife, Head of State Khertek Anchimaa-Toka.
Alpenland	Alsace; South Baden; Bavaria; Austria; German-speaking Switzerland; Liechtenstein	1945–1952	No	Main article: Alemannic Separatism § Separatism After the end of World War II, there was a political movement in southern Alsace and South Baden, originating from resistance movements against the Nazi regime, which aimed for the creation of a separate Alemannic state together with Basel in Switzerland. Bernhard Dietrich, mayor of Singen, aimed at a larger "Alpine union" which was to include also Bavarian-speaking territories (e.g. Bavaria and Austria) and the rest of the German-speaking part of the Swiss Confederation.
Ewe Land	(France) French Togoland; British Togoland	1945–1956	No	In 1945 various members of Ewe and wider Togolese leadership began the construction of political organizations which sought to decolonize French Togoland. These developed as the Comité de l'Unité Togolaise, led by Sylvanus Olympio, and the Mouvement la Jeunesse Togolaise. Both possessed political platforms that included the reunification of the French Togoland and British Togoland.
Maghreb Federation	Algeria; Libya (France) Mauritania; French Morocco; Spanish Morocco (Spain) Spanish Sahara (French protectorate of Tunisia) Tunisia	1945–1958	No	The first charter to create a Maghreb Federation was signed in Tunisia and Morocco in May 1945, but only became effective in 1958.
United Arab Kingdom	Transjordan; Palestine	1945–1972	No	King Hussein's federation plan: In the late 1940s and early 1950s, there were discussions of a potential merger between Palestine and Jordan, which was then known as Transjordan. The idea was initially proposed by King Abdullah I of Jordan, who sought to create a larger Arab state in the region that would include both Jordan and Palestine. The proposal was also supported by some Israeli politicians who believed that a union with Jordan would help to resolve the ongoing conflict between Jews and Arabs in the region.
Balkan Federation	Strictest definition: Socialist Federal Republic of Yugoslavia; People's Socialist Republic of Albania; People's Republic of Bulgaria; Loosest definition also includes: Socialist Republic of Romania; Provisional Democratic Government	1946–1948	No	Josip Broz Tito came extremely close to persuading Albania to accept integration into Yugoslavia, but relations cooled in 1948 over fears that Yugoslavia only intended to use Albania for raw materials, subsequently resulting in the expulsion of Yugoslav diplomats. Yugoslav/Bulgarian negotiations fell through when Moscow attempted to force both countries into accepting Soviet control over the merge, which caused Yugoslavia to withdraw from negotiations and precipitated the Tito–Stalin split.
United States of Indonesia	Bangka; Banjar; Billiton; Central Java; Djakarta; East Borneo; East Indonesia; East Java; East Sumatra; Great Dayak; Indonesia; Kotawaringin; Madura; Padang; Pasundan; Sabang; South Sumatra; Southeast Borneo; Riouw; West Borneo	1946–1949	Yes	Following discussions between Dutch authorities and Indonesian nationalist leaders, the Linggadjati Agreement was signed on 15 November 1946, in which the unilaterally declared Republic of Indonesia agreed to the principle of a federal Indonesia including the territory controlled by the Republic and other territory in the region which the Dutch controlled at that point. The Dutch then organised the December 1946 Denpasar Conference, which led to the establishment of the State of East Indonesia, followed by a state in West Borneo. Further states were set up in former territory of the Republic after they were conquered by the Dutch in 1947. Further Dutch military action faced increasing resistance from governments of the states they had established, and this combined with international pressure caused the Dutch–Indonesian Round Table Conference to take place in The Hague from August to November 1949. This Conference resulted in the Dutch agreeing to hand over sovereignty to a federal union of these states, which officially became the Republic of the United States of Indonesia. This federation lasted only a year, as its member states agreed to dissolve themselves into a unitary state, the last stage of which took place on 17 August 1950.
South East Asian Federation	Siam; Union of Burma; Vietnam; Laos; Khmer; Also invited: Indonesia; Philippines; Malayan Union; British Borneo	1947–1948	No	Envisioned by Siamese Prime Minister Pridi Banomyong. Conceived under the South East Asia League (SEAL) alliance, the plan envisions a united federated Southeast Asia amid the surging tide of post-war anti-colonial nationalism in Southeast Asian countries.
India	India (British Raj) 552 Princely states Among them: Bhopal; Hyderabad; Jammu and Kashmir; Junagadh; Manipur; Mysore; Travancore; Also invited: Sikkim	1947–1950	Yes	When the British Raj ceased to exist in August 1947, India and Pakistan gained independence. At the same time, British suzerainty over the princely states came to an end, and these states formally acquired the right to declare full independence or to join one of the two new nations. In May 1947, head of the Interim Government of India Jawaharlal Nehru declared that any princely state which refused to join the Constituent Assembly would be treated as an enemy state. Most of the princely states signed an instrument of accession with India, but a few states became the scenes of conflict. Junagadh and Hyderabad were annexed through the use of force, while the accession of Kashmir to India triggered a war with Pakistan, resulting in the partition of the former state. The Kingdom of Sikkim retained its independence, despite protests from the Sikkim State Congress.
Pakistan	Pakistan (British Raj) 13 Princely states Also invited: Jammu and Kashmir; Jodhpur; Junagadh	1947–1950	Yes	
Dominion of Canada	Dominion of Canada; Dominion of Newfoundland	1948–1949	Yes	In two rounds of referendums in 1948, the Dominion of Newfoundland had the choice of becoming an independent state, merging with the Dominion of Canada, or remaining as a British dominion. The Newfoundland Act of 1949, an act of the Parliament of the United Kingdom, confirmed and gave effect to the Terms of Union agreed to between the then-separate Dominions of Canada and Newfoundland on 23 March 1949.
Dominion of Canada	Dominion of Canada; Bermuda	1949	No	In 1949 Henry Vassey, then Chairman of the Bermuda Trade Development Board, urged the House of Assembly of Bermuda to pursue a political union with Canada. Four Methodist church congregations in Bermuda are part of the United Church of Canada, forming Bermuda Presbytery of the United Church's Maritime Conference headquartered in Sackville, New Brunswick. The same Salvation Army Church territory serves both Canada and Bermuda with many of their pastors travelling between countries. In January 2009, Nova Scotia's Premier, Rodney MacDonald, and the Premier of Bermuda, Ewart Brown, signed a five-year agreement that would strengthen Nova Scotia's ties with Bermuda and enhance service export opportunities, tourism, transportation and health links in both jurisdictions. Bermuda's ties to Canada include the Institute of Chartered Accountants of Bermuda being overseen by Canada's Chartered Professional Accounting profession.
Netherlands–Indonesia Union	Netherlands; United States of Indonesia	1949–1956	Partial	After the Netherlands had signed a truce with the United States of Indonesia, a transfer of sovereignty took place on 27 December 1949. As part of the Linggadjati Agreement, the Netherlands–Indonesia Union was founded. The Union was abolished when Indonesia left in 1956.
State of the Fertile Crescent	Jordan; Iraq; Syria; Lebanon; Palestine	1949–1958	No	Fertile Crescent Plan
Franco-German Federation	West Germany; France; Saar Protectorate	1950	No	The idea of a Franco-German federation was a proposed merger between France and Germany after the end of World War II. The idea was promoted by French politician Robert Schuman in his declaration on 9 May 1950, which is now celebrated as Europe Day. The aim of the proposal was to create a lasting peace between the two countries and to promote economic cooperation. The Franco-German federation proposal envisioned a common government, currency, and military. It also sought to establish a European Coal and Steel Community (ECSC), which would integrate the coal and steel industries of France and Germany. The ECSC was created in 1952 and was the first step toward the creation of the European Union.
Greece	Greece; Cyprus	1950	No	An unofficial referendum on enosis (reunification) with Greece was held in Cyprus between 15 and 22 January 1950, and the proposal was approved by 95.71% of those taking part.
China	People's Republic of China; Tibet	1950–1951	Yes	Chinese invasion results in the signing of the Seventeen Point Agreement and annexation of Tibet.
Indonesia	Indonesia; Netherlands New Guinea	1950–1969	Yes	Following Dutch recognition of Indonesian Independence, Indonesia continued to claim the remaining Dutch territory in the region, Netherlands New Guinea, as its rightful territory. The dispute escalated into low-level conflict in 1962 following Dutch moves in 1961 to establish a New Guinea Council. Facing diplomatic pressure from the United States, fading domestic support and continual Indonesian threats to invade the territory, the Netherlands decided to relinquish control of the disputed territory in August 1962. Following a short period of UN administration, the territory was transferred to Indonesia on 1 May 1963.
Federation of Rhodesia and Nyasaland	Protectorate of Nyasaland; Protectorate of Northern Rhodesia; Colony of Southern Rhodesia	1953	Yes	Lord Llewellin
Argentina-Chile Unification	Argentina; Chile	1953	No	President of Argentina, Juan Domingo Perón, proposed to Chilean presidente, Carlos Ibáñez del Campo, to unify both countries and be the first step for a Hispanoamerican Unification. It was rejected due to Chilean fears of Argentinian absorption, and the fall of Peronist regime in 1955.
Afghanistan-Pakistan Confederation	Proposed: Kingdom of Afghanistan (Pakistan) Dominion of Pakistan; Considered: Indian Kashmir; Kazakhstan; Kirghizia; Tajikistan; Turkmenistan; Uzbekistan	1953–1954	No	Afghanistan–Pakistan Confederation plan referred to a plan proposed between the governments of Afghanistan and Pakistan between 1953 and 1954 to merge both countries under a single confederation. These plans were started by Ayub Khan, the president of Pakistan and the monarchy of Afghanistan under King Zahir Shah. President Zia-ul-Haq too was for such confederation. "Charles Wilson recalled a map that Zia had also shown to him in which overlay indicated the goal of a confederation embracing first Pakistan and Afghanistan and eventually Central Asia and Kashmir. Zia further explained about the Pakistan-Afghanistan confederation in which Pakistanis and Afghans could travel freely back and forth without passports." General Akhtar Abdur Rahman, considered Zia's right-hand man and more importantly the DG-ISI (1979–1987), himself a Pashtun, "also shared Zia's vision of a post-Soviet "Islamic Confederation" composed of Pakistan, Afghanistan, Kashmir and even the states of Soviet Central Asia."
West Germany	West Germany; Saar Protectorate	1955–1957	Yes	1955 Saar Statute referendum. Saarland became a state of Germany and exited France's economic union.
United Kingdom	United Kingdom; Crown Colony of Malta	1956	No	1956 Maltese United Kingdom integration referendum
Ghana	Gold Coast (United Kingdom) British Togoland	1956	Yes	In the 1956 British Togoland status plebiscite 58% of voters supported a union with Ghana, whereas 42% voted in favor of remaining a United Nations Trust Territory under British control until neighbouring French Togoland had decided its future.
North Borneo Federation	Crown Colony of North Borneo; Crown Colony of Sarawak; Protectorate of Brunei	1956–1960	No	Sarawak and North Borneo merged with the independent Federation of Malaya several years later, forming Malaysia, while Brunei later became an independent state on its own.
Melanesian Federation	Dutch New Guinea; Solomon Islands Protectorate; Territory of Papua and New Guinea	1957	No	Australian Governor General John Kerr was a vocal proponent of the idea of a Melanesian Federation as a solution to the West Papua dispute.
United States of Latin Africa	Angola; Belgian Congo; Ruanda-Urundi; French Congo; Ubangi-Shari; French Chad; French Cameroon; French Gabon; Spanish Guinea; São Tomé and Príncipe	1957–1959	No	Proposed union of Romance-language-speaking Central African countries envisioned by Barthélemy Boganda. Boganda first called for it in May 1957. The idea's implementation was cut short by Boganda's death in a plane crash on 29 March 1959. Boganda viewed this entity to be a counterweight to the powerful British-influenced southern bloc of South Africa and the Federation of Rhodesia and Nyasaland.
West Indies Federation	British Barbados; British Jamaica; British Leeward Islands (except the Virgin Islands); British Trinidad and Tobago; British Windward Islands; Also invited: Crown Colony of the Bahama Islands; British Guiana; British Honduras; British Virgin Islands	1958	Yes	The expressed intention of the Federation was to create a political unit that would become independent from Britain as a single state. However, before that could happen, the Federation collapsed due to internal political conflicts.
United Arab Republic	Republic of Egypt; Syrian Republic	1958	Yes	A short-lived Pan-Arab state.
United Arab States	United Arab Republic; Mutawakkilite Kingdom of Yemen	1958	Yes	Loose confederation between the United Arab Republic and North Yemen.
Arab Federation	Kingdom of Iraq; Hashemite Kingdom of Jordan	1958	Yes	An attempt to unify the two Hashemite kingdoms of Iraq and Jordan. While successful, the short-lived union was disestablished after a military coup deposed Faisal II of Iraq.
Sahel-Benin Union	Republic of Upper Volta; Niger (Benin) Republic of Dahomey; Ivory Coast	1958–1959	Yes	Followed by the Conseil de l'Entente.
Cameroon	Cameroon; Spanish Guinea	1958–1963	No	The Equatoguinean independence leader Enrique Nvo and the first formal Equatoguinean political party, IPGE, advocated for independence from Spain and a political union between Cameroon and Equatorial Guinea. The idea of a union was deemed unfeasible after the 1963 Spanish Guinean autonomy referendum.
(Union of Independent African States) Union of African States	Ghana; Guinea; Mali (joined in 1961)	1958–1963	Yes	The union planned to develop a common currency and unified foreign policy amongst members; however, none of these proposals were implemented by the countries. The union was the first organization in Africa to bring together former colonies of the British and the French. Although the union was open to all independent states in Africa, no other states joined.
Mali Federation	Senegal (French Sudan) Sudanese republic Also invited: Dahomey; Upper Volta	1959–1960	Yes	Senghor became very wary of unification efforts after the failed experiment and despite attempts to create other federations in West Africa and with Senegal's neighbours, Senghor often restrained these efforts and they only progressed after his rule. In addition, as the first failed unification experiment in Africa, the Mali Federation served as a lesson in future attempts at unification throughout the continent. Keïta became more assertive with pushing his ideology after the collapse of the federation and refused diplomatic relations with Senegal for many years. Nonetheless, Mali under Keïta still pursued the goal of West African unity but did so in a variety of different international connections.
Somali Republic	Trust Territory of Somalia; State of Somaliland	1960	Yes	On 26 June 1960 the former British Somaliland protectorate briefly obtained independence as the State of Somaliland, with the Trust Territory of Somaliland following suit five days later. The following day, on 27 June 1960, the newly convened Somaliland Legislative Assembly approved a bill that would formally allow for the union of the State of Somaliland with the Trust Territory of Somaliland on 1 July 1960. Following the collapse of Barre's government in early 1991, local authorities, led by the SNM, unilaterally declared independence from Somalia on 18 May of the same year and reinstated the borders of the former short-lived independent State of Somaliland.
Soviet Union	Soviet Union; People's Republic of Bulgaria	1960	No	The leader of the People's Republic of Bulgaria, Todor Zhivkov, suggested in the early 1960s that the country should become a union republic, but the offer was rejected.
Azerbaijan SSR	Azerbaijan SSR; Mangystau	1960–1962	No	"In September, 1960, Khrushchev invited the then Kazakh leaders to Moscow - the secretary of the republican Central Committee of the party, Dinmukhamed Kunayev, and the head of the Council of Ministers, Zhumabek Tashenev. He told them that along with the creation in the same year of the “Tselinny Krai” as part of all North Kazakhstan regions, it would be necessary to think about transferring a number of other territories to Azerbaijan and Turkmenistan." "At that time Khrushchev was obsessed with the obsession to cut off land in the north, south and west from Kazakhstan and distribute them to its neighbors. Five northern grain regions were to go to Russia, Mangyshlak oil fields to Turkmenistan or Azerbaijan, cotton areas - Uzbekistan." "Finally, in 1962, Moscow started talking about the transfer of the Mangyshlak Peninsula (this is almost 25% of the territory of Kazakhstan) now to Azerbaijan. The idea was filed from Baku, and the rationale was that Mangyshlak had long been engaged in the oil industry. The leadership of Kazakhstan instructed Shahmardan Yesenov, the republican minister of geology, to “fight back”."
East African Federation	Kenya Colony; Tanganyika Territory; Uganda Protectorate; Sultanate of Zanzibar	1960–1964	No	Proposed political union between the four territories (one colony, two protectorates and one League of Nations mandated territory) under British rule in East Africa in the 1960s. Tanganyika proposed to delay its imminent independence in 1960 so that the four territories might achieve independence together as one federation. In 1963 the leaders of all of the territories (some now independent) pledged to work towards a federation by 1964, but ultimately disputes over the nature of the federation and concerns about sharing power led to the collapse of effort to federate. Only Tanganyika and Zanzibar eventually united in 1964.
Cameroon	Cameroon; British Cameroon	1961	Partially (Southern Cameroons)	In the 1961 British Cameroons referendum, the Christian majority in the south of British Cameroon voted to integrate with Cameroon, whereas the Muslim-majority Northern areas voted to integrate with Nigeria.
Nigeria	Nigeria; British Cameroon	1961	Partially (Northern Cameroons)	In the 1961 British Cameroons referendum, the Christian majority in the south of British Cameroon voted to integrate with Cameroon, whereas the Muslim-majority Northern areas voted to integrate with Nigeria.
India	India; Portuguese State of India	1961	Yes	Annexation of Dadra and Nagar Haveli, Annexation of Goa
India	India; French Settlements in India	1962	Yes	Coup d'état of Yanaon
Confederation of Himalayan States	Bhutan; Nagaland; Nepal; North-East Frontier Agency; Sikkim	1962	No	In 1962, China proposed a Confederation of Himalayan States.
Federation of the Emirates of the South	Fadhli; Audhali; Beihan; Dhala; Lower Yafa; Upper Aulaqi Sheikhdom; Alawi; Aqrabi; Dathina; Haushabi; Lahej; Lower Aulaqi; Maflahi; Shaib; Wahidi	1962	Yes	The Federation of the Emirates of the South (Arabic: اتحاد إمارات الجنوب العربي Ittiḥād ʾImārāt al-Janūb al-ʿArabiyy) was an organization of states within the British Aden Protectorate in what would become South Yemen. The Federation of six states was inaugurated in the British Colony of Aden on 11 February 1959, and the Federation and Britain signed a "Treaty of Friendship and Protection," which detailed plans for British financial and military assistance. It subsequently added nine states and, on 4 April 1962, became known as the Federation of South Arabia. This was joined by the Aden Colony on 18 January 1963.
Trinidad and Tobago	Trinidad and Tobago; Grenada	1962	No	The Grenada National Party campaigned for union with the newly independent Trinidad and Tobago at the 1962 Grenadian general election. GNP leader Herbert Blaize held talks with Trinidad's prime minister Eric E. Williams and proposed that Grenada enjoy a similar constitutional status to the island of Tobago, with proportional representation in the Legislative Council of Trinidad and Tobago and possibly guaranteed cabinet representation.
Maphilindo	Malaya; Indonesia; Philippines	1963	No	Proposals to create a union of the people of the Malay race and deal with the continued decolonisation of Southeast Asia led to leaders of the three countries signing the Manila Accord on 5 August 1963. However, cooperation quickly broke down following the formation of Malaysia by Malaya and other former British colonies in the region, which was opposed by Indonesia and the Philippines.
Malaysia	Federation of Malaya; Crown Colony of North Borneo; Crown Colony of Sarawak; Colony of Singapore; Also invited: Brunei	1963	Yes	Singapore was expelled from the federation on 9 August 1965, later forming the Republic of Singapore. Brunei Sultan Omar Ali Saifuddien III accepted the idea but rejected after the Brunei revolt.
United Republic of Tanzania	Republic of Tanganyika; People's Republic of Zanzibar	1964	Yes	Articles of Union
Australia	Australia; Nauru	1964–1965	No	In 1963 the Australian Government proposed that the citizens of Nauru, a United Nations trust territory under Australian administration, would move to Curtis Island and become Australian citizens. By that time, Nauru had been extensively mined for phosphate by companies from Australia, Britain and New Zealand damaging the landscape so much that it was thought the island would be uninhabitable by the 1990s. The cost of resettling the Nauruans on Curtis Island was estimated to be £10 million, which included housing and infrastructure and the establishment of pastoral, agricultural, and fishing industries. However, the Nauruan people did not wish to become Australian citizens and wanted to be given sovereignty over Curtis Island to establish themselves as an independent nation, which Australia would not agree to. Nauru rejected the proposal to move to Curtis Island, instead choosing to become an independent nation operating their mines in Nauru. Nauru became self-governing in January 1966, and following a two-year constitutional convention, it became independent in 1968 under founding president Hammer DeRoburt.
Territory of the Marianas	Territory of Guam; Commonwealth of the Northern Mariana Islands	1969	No	1958 Saipan integration referendum, 1961 Northern Mariana Islands status referendum, 1963 Northern Mariana Islands integration referendum, 1969 Guamanian unification with the Northern Mariana Islands referendum, 1969 Northern Mariana Islands status referendum
United Arab Emirates	Abu Dhabi (Emirate of Dubai) Dubai; Sharjah; Ajman; Umm Al Quwain; Fujairah; Ras Al Khaimah; Also invited: Bahrain; Qatar	1971–1972	Yes	Six independent emirates formed the United Arab Emirates on 2 December 1971. Ras Al Khaimah later joined the federation.
(Egypt) Federation of Arab Republics	Libya; Egypt; Syria; Also invited: Iraq; Sudan	1972–1977	Yes	An attempt by Muammar Gaddafi to build a Pan-Arab state.
Arab Islamic Republic	Libya; Tunisia	1974	No	Proposed by Muammar Gaddafi.
Indochinese Federation	North Vietnam; South Vietnam; Democratic Kampuchea; Laos	1975	No	Despite Kampuchea's cooperation with the Vietnamese, the Khmer Rouge leadership feared that the Vietnamese communists were planning to form an Indochinese federation, which would be dominated by Vietnam. In order to pre-empt any attempt by the Vietnamese to dominate them, the Khmer Rouge leadership began, as the Lon Nol government capitulated in 1975, to purge Vietnamese-trained personnel within their own ranks. Then, in May 1975, the newly formed Democratic Kampuchea began attacking Vietnam, beginning with an attack on the Vietnamese island of Phú Quốc.
India	India; Sikkim	1975	Yes	After independence in 1947, joining the new Indian Union was rejected by popular vote. Sikkim grew closer to India over time, becoming a protectorate and later a suzerainty of India. With Indian pressure and support, Sikkim voted to join India in 1975.
(Guinea-Bissau) Republic of Guinea-Cape Verde	Guinea-Bissau; Cape Verde	1975	No	The African Party for the Independence of Guinea and Cape Verde (PAIGC) advocated for the independence of the colonies of Portuguese Guinea and Portuguese Cape Verde, and governed both countries immediately after independence (1974 for Guinea-Bissau, and 1975 for Cape Verde) with the goal of unifying the two. However, following a 1980 coup in Guinea-Bissau, the Cape Verde branch of the party separated to form the African Party for the Independence of Cape Verde (PAICV), ending plans for a union.
Indonesia	Indonesia; East Timor	1975–1976	Yes	Indonesian invasion of East Timor
Vietnam	North Vietnam; South Vietnam	1976	Yes	Fall of Saigon, Reunification Day
Solomon Islands	British Solomon Islands; Republic of the North Solomons	1976	No	The Interim Provincial Government announced that they would declare independence on 1 September, ahead of Papua New Guinea's own planned independence day of 16 September. On 1 September, they issued the 'Unilateral Declaration of Independence of the Republic of the North Solomons'. They sought international recognition through the United Nations, but were unsuccessful. They also failed in an attempt to unite with the Solomon Islands.
Socialist Union of the Horn of Africa	Ethiopia; Somalia; South Yemen	1977	No	In early 1977, Castro brought together the leaders of Somalia, Ethiopia and South Yemen to create a socialist federal state in the region. General Mohamed Nur Galal was the former deputy defense minister of Somalia and the vocal point of Somalia's military contacts with Cuba at that time. He was present at the meeting in Aden in March 1977.
Libyan-Syrian Union	(History of Libya under Muammar Gaddafi) Libya; Syria	1980	No	Preceded by the Federation of Arab Republics.
Democratic Confederal Republic of Koryo	North Korea; South Korea	1980	No	In accordance with the three principles and the ten point programme, Kim Il Sung elaborated on the proposed state, called Democratic Confederal Republic of Koryo (DFRK), on 10 October 1980, in the Report to the Sixth Congress of the Workers' Party of Korea on the Work of the Central Committee. Kim proposed a confederation between North and South Korea, in which their respective political systems would initially remain. It is described by North Korea as a "...peaceful reunification proposal to found a federal state on the condition that the north and the south recognize and tolerate each other's existing ideologies." It was stated that the DFRK should be a neutral country which does not participate in any political, military alliance or bloc, embracing the whole of the territory and people of the country.
Libya-Chad Union	Libya; Chad	1981	No	Proposed by Muammar Gaddafi and Goukouni Oueddei.
Swaziland	Swaziland; KaNgwane; Also invited: KwaZulu	1982–1989	No	An attempt to transfer the bantustan, along with parts of the Zulu homeland KwaZulu, to the neighbouring country of Swaziland in 1982 was never realized. This would have given land-locked Swaziland access to the sea. The deal was negotiated by the governments, but was met by popular opposition in the territory meant to be transferred. The homeland's territory had been claimed by King Sobhuza of Swaziland as part of the Swazi monarchs' traditional realm, and the South African government hoped to use the homeland as a buffer zone against guerrilla infiltration from Mozambique. South Africa responded to the failure of the transfer by temporarily suspending the autonomy of KaNgwane, then restoring it in December 1982 and granting it nominal self-rule in 1984.
Senegambia Confederation	Senegal; The Gambia	1982–1989	Yes	A loose confederation was formed, but ended due to the Gambia's lack of interest in integration.
Burkina Faso-Ghana Union	Burkina Faso; Ghana	1983–1987	No	With the coming to power of Thomas Sankara in Burkina Faso in 1983, relations between Ghana and Burkina became both warm and close. Indeed, Jerry Rawlings and Sankara began discussions about uniting Ghana and Burkina in the manner of the defunct Ghana-Guinea-Mali Union, which Nkrumah had sought unsuccessfully to promote as a foundation for his dream of a unified continental government.
Yemen	North Yemen; South Yemen	1989–1990	Yes	Yemeni unification
Germany	West Germany; East Germany; West Berlin	1989–1990	Yes	German reunification
Union of Soviet Sovereign Republics	Proposed: Russia; Byelorussia; Ukraine; Azerbaijan; Kazakhstan; Kirghizia; Tajikistan; Turkmenistan; Uzbekistan; Considered: Gagauzia; Transnistria; Abkhazia; South Ossetia	1990–1991	No	1991 Soviet Union referendum
Windward Islands	Dominica; Grenada; Saint Lucia; Saint Vincent and the Grenadines	1991	No	On 14 January 1991, the four Caribbean island nations of Dominica, Grenada, Saint Lucia, and Saint Vincent and the Grenadines began an initiative to create a political union encompassing themselves.
FR Yugoslavia	SR Serbia; Montenegro; Bosnia and Herzegovina	1991	No	Zulfikarpašić–Karadžić agreement
FR Yugoslavia	SR Serbia; Montenegro	1992	Yes	Žabljak Constitution
Greek–Serbian confederation	FR Yugoslavia; North Macedonia; Greece	1992	No	The creation of the tripartite confederation of Serbia, Greece and North Macedonia was unofficially proposed by Slobodan Milošević in 1992. In 1994, Milošević invited Greek Prime Minister Andreas Papandreou to consider his 1992 confederation proposal. Papandreou characterized the idea as "a pioneering, interesting proposal" but noted that it had not yet been examined. Main opposition New Democracy party leader Miltiadis Evert, who had also met with Milošević, said that all Balkan countries should instead gain accession to the European Union. Political Spring party leader Antonis Samaras said that the proposal was "interesting but should be thoroughly examined." These proposals eventually failed to gain support among any faction in Greece.
Volga Confederation	Tatarstan; Bashkortostan; Minor support Mordovia; Mari El; Chuvashia	1992–1995	No	Post-Soviet proposals for a Confederation of Volga republics
Balkania	SR Serbia; Montenegro; Kosova	1993–2006	No	Suggested by the Kosovo Albanian politician Adem Demaçi
South Africa	South Africa; Bophuthatswana; Ciskei; Transkei; Venda	1994	Yes	During apartheid the South African Government granted nominal independence to four autonomous bantustans within it. While no external country recognized these states, South Africa strongly promoted their independence and the four mutually recognized each other. As South Africa moved to end apartheid, the African National Congress (ANC) party advocated reintegration of all bantustans, including the nominally independent ones, into a unitary South African state. Resistance to integration by leaders of some bantustans led to violence, such as in the Bisho massacre and the Bophuthatswana crisis. Nonetheless, inhabitants of all four independent bantustans participated in the 1994 South African general election, during which a new constitution came into effect which reintegrated all bantustans into South Africa.

=== 21st century ===
Proposed state	Components	Time period	Successful?	Notes
Asymmetric Federal Moldavian State	Moldova; Transnistria	2003–2005	No	The Kozak memorandum, officially Russian Draft Memorandum on the Basic Principles of the State Structure of a United State in Moldova, was a 2003 proposal aimed at a final settlement of relations between Moldova and Transnistria and a solving of the Transnistria conflict. It was seen as an extension of the 1997 Moscow memorandum but was ultimately rejected by Moldovan president Vladimir Voronin. The plan, presented in mid-November 2003 by Russia, was a detailed proposal for a united asymmetric federal Moldavian state. First published in Russian on the website of Transnistria's Ministry of Foreign Affairs, the text was promoted by a Russian politician Dmitry Kozak, a close ally of President Vladimir Putin and one of the key figures in his presidential team. For Transnistria, the memorandum presented an end to the previous Moscow policy, which assumed that the region would have equal status in federation with the rest of the country. According to the memorandum, Russian troops (no more than 2000 strong, without heavy armaments) would remain in Transnistria for the transitional period but not later than 2020.
United Republic of Cyprus	Cyprus; Northern Cyprus	2004	No	A referendum was held in Cyprus on 24 April 2004. The two communities were asked whether they approved of the fifth revision of the United Nations proposal for reuniting the island, which had been divided since 1974. While it was approved by 65% of Turkish Cypriots, it was rejected by 76% of Greek Cypriots.
Novorossiya	Mykolaiv Oblast; Odesa Oblast; Kherson Oblast; Crimea	2005–2008	No	After the Orange Revolution, Dmitri Trenin of the Carnegie Moscow Center wrote that in 2005 and again in 2008 some quarters in Moscow, that were not entirely academic, discussed the idea of a Russia-friendly buffer state, "Novorossiya", being formed out of Southern Ukraine from the Crimea to Odesa in response to perceived Western penetration into the former Soviet Union.
Russian Federation	Russian Federation; Transnistria	2006	No	Proposed Russian annexation of Transnistria
Gran Colombia	Colombia; Ecuador; Panama; Venezuela	2008	No	Reunification of Gran Colombia, In 2008, Hugo Chávez, president of Venezuela, announced a proposal for the political restoration of Gran Colombia, under the Bolivarian revolution.
Lucayan Federation	Bahamas; Turks and Caicos Islands	2010	No	The Lucayan Archipelago (named for the original native Lucayan people), also known as the Bahama Archipelago, is an island group comprising the Commonwealth of The Bahamas and the British Overseas Territory of the Turks and Caicos Islands. The archipelago is in the western North Atlantic Ocean, north of Cuba along with the other Antilles, and east and southeast of Florida. In 2010 the leaders of The Bahamas and the Turks and Caicos Islands discussed the possibility of forming a federation.
Peru–Bolivian Confederation	Bolivia; Peru	2011	No	President Ollanta Humala of Peru proposed Bolivian president Evo Morales to reunite the countries in a confederation. The Cabinets of the two countries have held joint meetings.
Gulf Union	Bahrain; Kuwait; Oman; Qatar; Saudi Arabia; United Arab Emirates	2011–2012	No	In 2011, King Abdullah of Saudi Arabia proposed a Gulf Union.
Russian Federation	Russian Federation; Crimea	2014	Yes	Crimea, an autonomous republic of Ukraine, was invaded and later annexed by Russia. The annexation referendum was extremely controversial and most countries continue to recognize Crimea as part of Ukraine.
Novorossiya	Donetsk People's Republic; Luhansk People's Republic; Also planned: Kharkiv Oblast; Kherson Oblast; Dnipropetrovsk Oblast; Mykolaiv Oblast; Odesa Oblast; Zaporizhzhia Oblast; Planned, later removed: Sumy Oblast	2014–2015	Partial	Novorossiya (Full name: Federal State of Novorossiya) was a confederation between the two self-declared nations of the Donetsk People's Republic and the Luhansk People's Republic, proclaimed on 24 June 2015. According to Gubarev the full confederation would include Dnipropetrovsk, Kharkiv, Kherson, Mykolaiv, Odesa, Zaporizhzhia and possibly Sumy (later removed).
Levantine Confederation	Ba'athist Syria; Jordan; Palestine; Lebanon; Israel	2014–2021	No	In 2014, a Lebanese political activist and revolutionary Anis al-Naqqash proposed that the solution to the problems of the Middle East region was the establishment of a confederation that unites the states of the Levant, called ‘West Asian region’ by Naqqash.
Malorossiya	Donetsk People's Republic; Ukraine	2017	No	A project was declared on 18 July 2017 by the Donetsk People's Republic to include all of Ukraine, but the name was changed to "Malorossiya" (Little Russia). The Luhansk People's Republic, however, stated that it would not be taking part in the project. The announcement was widely condemned by nations, including Russia, which pointed to the Minsk agreement.
Malta	Malta Pantelleria	2018	No	In 2018, the Maltese sociologist Godfrey Baldacchino suggested that Malta buy Pantelleria. The way he saw it, this would solve Malta's overcrowding and temper pressure from mass immigration while returning jobs to Pantelleria. Since both islands have semitic elements in their languages and a similar colonial past, Baldacchino thought the purchase would also revive the bonds between them. Pantelleria's mayor responded with a call for commercial partnership, but Maltese citizens and academics on social media largely scoffed at Baldacchino's idea. Opponents feared Malta's dense urban environment would spill over to and defile Pantelleria and that Malta would attract more immigrants, as the Italian island is closer to Africa.
Russian Federation	Russian Federation; South Ossetia	2022	No	On 30 March 2022, President Anatoly Bibilov suggested a referendum on joining Russia, which was to be held on 17 July 2022; the referendum was cancelled on 30 May 2022.
Russian Federation	Russian Federation; Donetsk People's Republic; Luhansk People's Republic; Kherson Oblast; Zaporizhzhia Oblast	2022	Partial	In late September 2022, Russian-installed officials in some parts of Ukraine organized referendum on annexation of occupied territories of Ukraine. On 27 September, Russian officials of the Central Election Commission in Zaporizhzhia claimed that the referendum passed, with 93.11% of voters in favour of joining the Russian Federation. According to the data provided by the commission, the support for the annexation was 90.01% in the Melitopol Raion, while in its administrative center, Melitopol, it was 96.78%. On 29 September, Russia announced that it would formally annex the four regions Luhansk, Donetsk, Zaporizhzhia and Kherson the next day, on 30 September. The referendums were illegal under international law and most countries continue to recognize as part of Ukraine.
Alliance of Sahel States	Burkina Faso; Mali; Niger; Also invited: Guinea	2023–2024	Partial	In early 2023, Burkina Faso's prime minister after his visit in Mali suggested that the two countries should form a federation to boost their economic clout and fight against the jihadists in the region. Later in December of the same year, the foreign ministers of Burkina Faso, Mali, and Niger recommended the establishment of a confederation that includes every member of the Alliance of Sahel States. The confederation was established on 6 July 2024.
Argentina	Argentina; Annobón	2025	No	In May 2025, after declaring the Republic of Annobón independent from Equatorial Guinea as a member of the UNPO, the separatist group Ambô Legadu petitioned for the island province of Equatorial Guinea to become an associated state or province of Argentina.
Gran Colombia	Venezuela; Colombia	2025	No	On 18 December 2025, amid rising tensions with the United States and the threat of a United States invasion of Venezuela, Nicolás Maduro, president of Venezuela, proposed the formation of a Gran Colombia. He issued a direct appeal to the Colombian people, their social movements, and the Armed Forces of Colombia, urging them to pursue a 'perfect union' with Venezuela to defend what he described as the sovereignty of both countries. In January 2026, the United States intervened in Venezuela and seized Maduro and his wife on drugs charges.

== See also ==
- Arab Union
- Atlantic Union
- Balkan Federation
- Celtic union
- Composite monarchy
- Confederation
- Dynastic union
- 51st state#Canada
- Estonian–Finnish federation
- Alldutch Movement
- Union of Kėdainiai
- Fertile Crescent Plan
- Great Timor
- Greater Austria proposal
- Greater Mauritania
- Hellenoturkism
- Iberism
- Independence referendum
- Indo-Pakistani Confederation
- Irredentism
- List of confederations
- List of irredentist claims or disputes
- Lists of active separatist movements
- North American Union
- Pan-Americanism
- Pan-Hispanism
- Pan-Latinism
- Pan-nationalism
- Papuan unification
- Patria Grande
- Personal union
- Political union
- Proposed United States acquisition of Greenland
- Real union
- Samoan unification
- Supranational union
- Turanism
- Turkic Council
- URSAL
- Unified Political Command
- United Ireland
- United States of Africa
- United States of China
- United States of Europe
- World government

== Sources ==
- Foltz, William J. (1965). From French West Africa to the Mali Federation. New Haven: Yale University Press.
- Hodgkin, Thomas; Morgenthau, Ruth Schacter (1964). "Mali". In James Scott Coleman (ed.). Political Parties and National Integration in Tropical Africa. Berkeley, CA: University of California Press. pp. 216–258.
- Kurtz, Donn M. (1970). "Political Integration in Africa: The Mali Federation". The Journal of Modern African Studies. 8 (3): 405–424. doi:10.1017/s0022278x00019923. S2CID 154671339.
- Welch, Claude E. Jr. (1966). Dream of Unity, Pan-Africanism and Political Unification in West Africa. Ithaca, NY: Cornell University Press.
