= Patria Grande =

Concept of a shared homeland or community encompassing all of Spanish America

Map of an integrated Hispanic America. Basic "Patria Grande" with Spanish-speaking countries.

The Patria Grande (Spanish pronunciation: [ˈpatɾja ˈɣɾande], Spanish: "Greater Fatherland" or "Greater Homeland") is the concept of a shared homeland or community encompassing all of Spanish America, and sometimes all of Latin America and the Caribbean. The term is associated with political ideas of Ibero-American integration, rejecting the dissolution of the Spanish Empire in the Americas that followed the Spanish American wars of independence. The term may be also used to talk specifically about projects of Hispanic American unity held by Simón Bolívar and José de San Martín.

== Origin of the term ==
The name "Patria Grande" was coined by the Argentine Manuel Ugarte, in his book La Patria Grande. He gave speeches in many Hispanic American countries advocating their unification.

== History ==
The Spanish conquest of the Americas began in 1492, and ultimately was part of a larger historical process of world colonialism, through which various European powers incorporated a considerable amount of territory and peoples in the Americas, Asia, and Africa between the 15th and 20th centuries. Hispanic America became the main part of the vast Spanish Empire.

Napoleon's takeover of Spain in 1808 and the consequent chaos initiated the dismemberment of the Spanish Empire, as the American territories began their struggle for emancipation. By 1830, the only remaining Spanish American colonies were the islands of Cuba and Puerto Rico. These were subsequently lost in the 1898 Spanish–American War.

== Modern usage ==
President of Brazil Luiz Inácio Lula da Silva considers that the Mercosur helps the social, political and economic integration of Latin America, and that the Patria Grande may not be achieved by closing doors. This nickname has also been given by other South American heads of state.

Brazil's ambitions might be seen as different from the traditional idea of Patria Grande, though, as it is often argued that the country's historical foreign policy is shaped by the exclusion of Mexico and Central America (and the Caribbean, counted as Central America in the Portuguese sense of the term) as ideological and political cognates, seen as important US allies, with their paths in the opposite direction of interests central to its alleged project of a more sovereign, post-neoliberal, non-peripheral South America – or at least that of its left-leaning political parties and intelligentsia.

The concept is well-known and used by leftist activists and leaders across South America as an important part of their ideology, like Argentina's former president Cristina Fernández de Kirchner, and Ecuador's former President Rafael Correa, The most former of these, considered that former-President of Uruguay, Tabaré Vázquez, "assisted in consolidating the Patria Grande ideal."

In 2012, then-Vice president of Argentina, Amado Boudou, stated his country's commitment to the ideal when visiting Cochabamba in commemoration of Bolivia's independence bicentennial. For Argentina's bicentennial, Pope Francis "also prayed for that Patria Grande in our celebration: may the Lord take care of her, make her stronger, more sisterly and defend her from all kinds of colonizations." Since its inception in 2014, the Festival Patria Grande, focused on Latin rock, has been held in Cuba. Mangoré, for the love of art, a film based on Agustín Barrios' life was considered "an exaltation of the concept of a common and unique Latin American fatherland."

== See also ==
- Hispanic America
- Hispanidad
- La Raza
- Latin American integration
- Pan-Americanism
- Pan-Latinism
- Pan-nationalism
- Panhispanism
- Reunification of Central America
- Reunification of Gran Colombia
- URSAL
