= Jean Charles-Brun =

French politician (1870–1946)

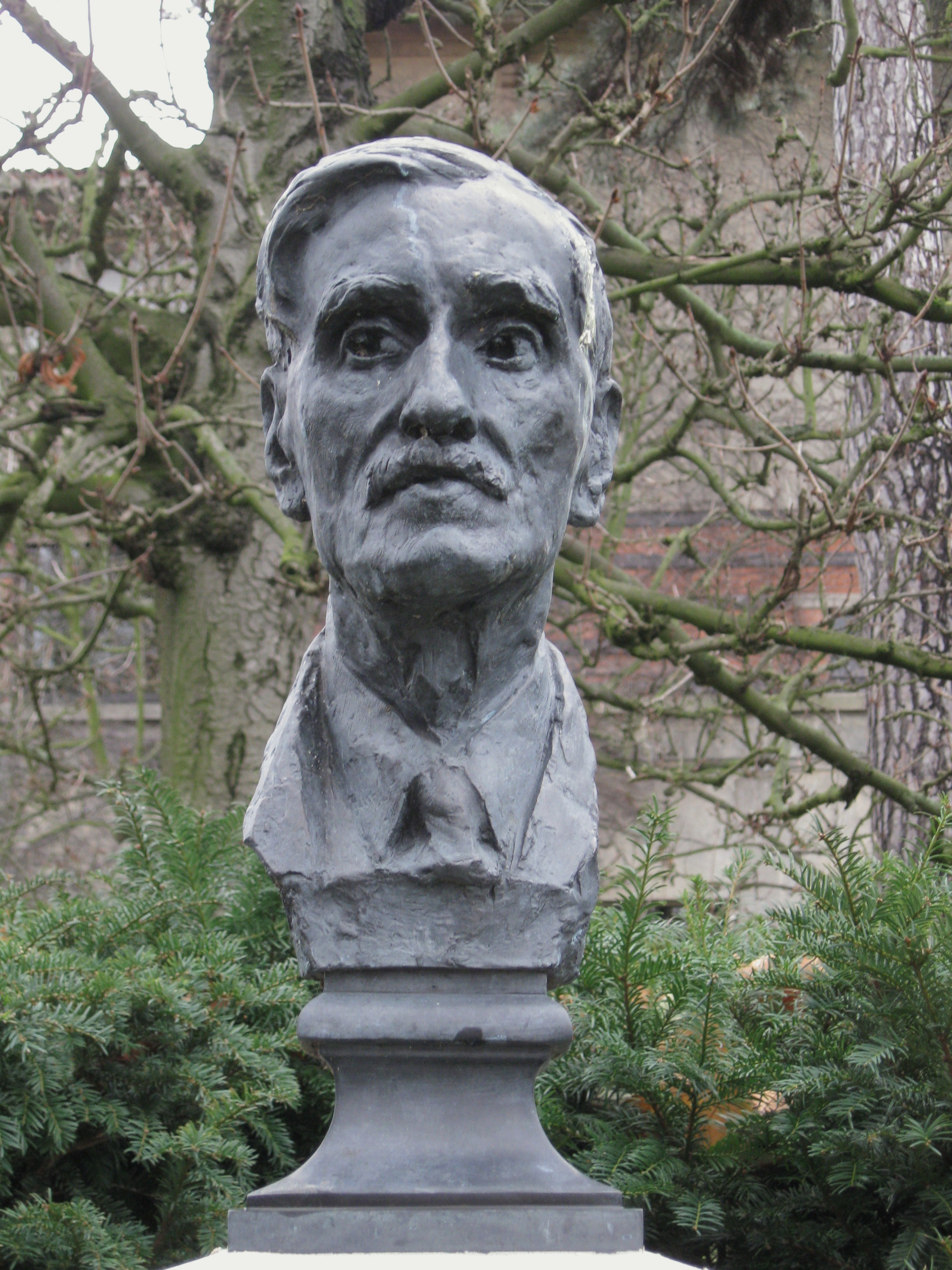
Bust of Jean Charles-Brun.

Jean Charles-Brun (29 December 1870, Montpellier – 14 October 1946, Paris) was an Occitan French proponent of autonomy of France's regions and then founded the French Regionalist Federation in 1901. Charles-Brun was also a proponent of pan-Latinism and the creation of a democratic international "confederation latine" ("Latin Confederation").
