= Alldutch Movement =

19th-century pan-nationalist movement

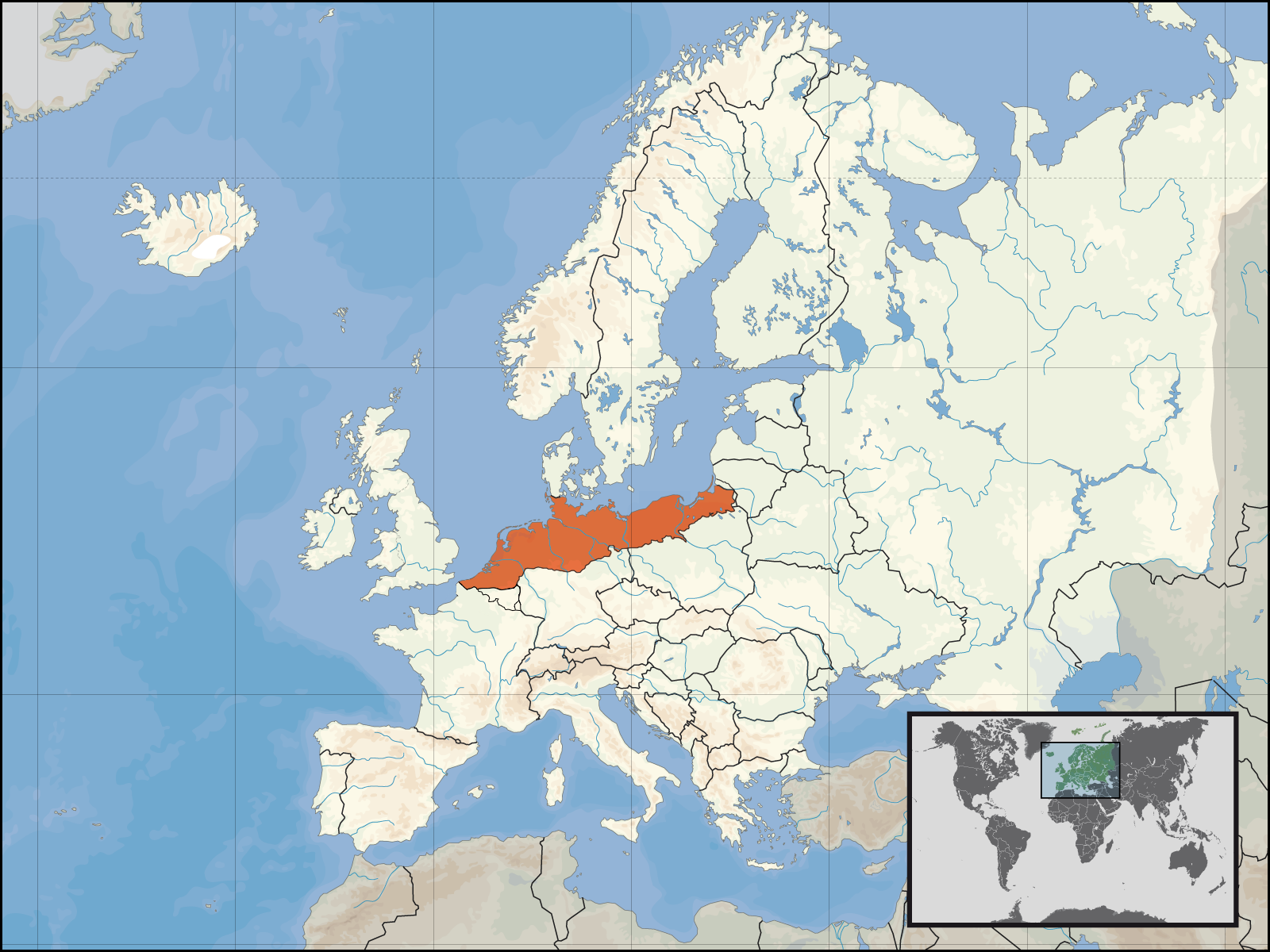
Lands claimed by the Alldutch Movement

The Alldutch Movement (Dutch: Aldietse Beweging) was a 19th-century pan-nationalist movement that aimed to politically, culturally, and linguistically unite the speakers of Dutch, Low German, and Frisian. The movement gained only limited support between the 1850s and 1870s, mainly in Belgium. It can be seen as a broader variant of Greater Netherlandism or the Flemish Movement, but with a stronger and more irredentist focus on language.

== History ==
The founder and leader of the Alldutch Movement was Constant Jacob Hansen (1833–1910), librarian at the Library of Antwerp and a Flamingant. Hansen, the son of a Danish father and a Dutch mother, traveled through northern Germany to Denmark in 1856 to learn more about his origins. Already a Flemish nationalist, he belonged to a faction within the Flemish movement that viewed German nationalism positively, not only because of the shared anti-French sentiment common to both movements (but largely absent in the Netherlands), but also due to the prestige of Germany as a rising power in Europe. His journey had a profound impact on him and convinced him of a natural cultural and linguistic affinity, as well as a commonality, among speakers of Dutch, Low German, and Frisian. The Alldutch Movement he founded presented itself as restorative and sought to revive and renew what it imagined to have been a once flourishing and influential shared or closely related culture that extended “from Dunkirk to Königsberg.”

The main catalyst and recurring central idea of Hansen’s movement, however, was his belief that the contemporary Dutch language had been corrupted and debased. As an enthusiastic scholar of Middle Dutch poetry, Hansen asserted that the commercial nature of Dutch society in the 16th and 17th centuries, along with increasing French linguistic influence, had devalued Dutch literature and language. The movement’s supporters hoped to renew and strengthen Dutch culture by adopting the vigor of German nationalism and idealizing (rural) northern Germany as a kind of refuge for a traditional Dutch–Low German culture. In doing so, the movement displayed many similarities with the later-founded Low German Movement, with which it collaborated quite extensively. However, the movements differed in several key respects. Within the Low German Movement, antisemitism was widespread, as was the belief that the Dutch and Flemings were actually offshoots of a greater Low German people or culture, which itself should be part of a Greater German nation. The Alldutch Movement, by contrast, did not seek to join the German nation. Instead, it aimed to restore and revitalize Dutch culture and expected the speakers of Low German to join this Dutch-Flemish community once it had been revived. Hansen even went so far as to create a new lingua franca for this community—tellingly, essentially Middle Dutch with a German-influenced orthography. The founding of the German Empire in 1871 brought these plans to an end and marked the demise of the movement.

The relative significance of the Alldutch Movement in the broader historiography of Dutch and Flemish nationalist movements is primarily due to the dedication of its founder, Hansen, who devoted much of his life to its promotion. The movement itself gained only limited support, mainly in Flanders, and achieved few noteworthy successes. Historians and critics have noted that, although the movement produced several publications aimed at fostering a sense of shared kinship among Dutch, Frisian, and Low German speakers, it completely lacked a political program or framework for uniting the Netherlands, Belgium, parts of France, Denmark, and northern Germany—nor did it outline how such a unification should concretely take place. The unification of Germany under Prussian leadership effectively ended the Alldutch Movement, as the prospects for any such union ceased to exist.

== Literature ==
- Ludo Simons, From Dunkirk to Königsberg, history of the Aldiets movement, Orbis and Orion, 1980.
