= Central American reunification =

Central American political proposition

A map of the original Federal Republic of Central America.

Central American reunification, sometimes called Central Americanism, is the proposed political union of the countries of Central America (historically, Costa Rica, El Salvador, Guatemala, Honduras, and Nicaragua), which had been united as one country during the existence of the Federal Republic of Central America. It is distinct from the Central American integration process, which is a diplomatic initiative similar to that of the European Union.

Currently the civil organization Movimiento Ciudadano para la Integración Centroamericana ('Citizen Movement for Central American Integration') founded in 2014 actively seeks Central American reunification, having chapters in El Salvador, Guatemala, Honduras (in addition to some local chapters), Nicaragua, and in the Central American diaspora (Australia, Italy, Spain, and the United States), but not in Costa Rica. These chapters are known as "state councils".

== History ==
Attempts to restore the Federal Republic of Central America have existed since its dissolution. One of the best known cases was when the liberal Guatemalan President Justo Rufino Barrios, with the support of Honduras and the United States, tried to re-establish the Central American Federation in the so-called Intentona de Barrios, but that ended with his death in the Battle of Chalchuapa in 1885. Other short-lived attempts include the Greater Republic of Central America between 1896 and 1898 and the Federation of Central America between 1921 and 1922.

During the 20th century, it was mainly leftist forces that would propose the reunification of Central America into a single political unit. In 1925, the Central American Socialist Party was founded in Guatemala by Farabundo Martí and other Salvadorans in exile, and would later also operate as the Central American Communist Party. In the 1970s, the Revolutionary Party of Central American Workers, particularly active in El Salvador and Honduras, would emerge.

On September 12, 1946, a meeting of heads of state took place in Santa Ana, El Salvador, where the Santa Ana Agreement between El Salvador and Guatemala was signed. The two countries agreed to study the conditions that will allow the political unity of Central America through a Commission composed of three persons appointed by each of the governments subscribed to the agreement. The agreement was left open for the accession of Costa Rica, Honduras and Nicaragua. This was ratified by El Salvador on November 19.

Some of the parties that still actively propose Central American reunification are the Movement to Socialism of Honduras, the new Central American Socialist Party and the Workers' Party of Costa Rica.

In the early 2020s, Salvadoran President Nayib Bukele put forward calls for pursuing a deeper regional integration, eventually resulting in a modern Central American unified nation.

== Comparison of component countries ==
Flag	Arms	Country	Capital	Area (km^{2})	Population (2019)	GDP (nominal) (2019)	GDP (PPP) (2017)	GDP (PPP) per capita (2019)
(Costa Rica)		Costa Rica	San José	51,180	5,047,561	$61.774 Billion	$83.852 Billion	$20,434.4
(El Salvador)		El Salvador	San Salvador	21,041	6,453,553	$27.023 Billion	$56.991 Billion	$9,139.7
(Guatemala)		Guatemala	Guatemala City	108,889	16,604,026	$76.710 Billion	$137.804 Billion	$8,995.5
(Honduras)		Honduras	Tegucigalpa	112,492	9,746,117	$25.095 Billion	$46.198 Billion	$5,965.4
(Nicaragua)		Nicaragua	Managua	130,375	6,545,502	$12.521 Billion	$36.382 Billion	$5,631.2
Total (Excluding Panama)				423,977	44,396,759	$203.123 Billion	$361.227 Billion	$8,136.3
(Panama)		Panama	Panama City	75,417	4,337,768	$82.3 Billion	$190 Billion	$42,738
Total (Including Panama)				499,394	48,734,527	$285.4 Billion	$551 Billion	$11,306

Central America is traditionally thought of as the seven countries south of Mexico, but north of Colombia. Panama is included here for comparison even though it was not a part of the 19th century Federal Republic. Another country in this region is Belize, which is a small English speaking country, which used to be part of the British Empire. Technically Colombia has a small jut of land into the Central region with the town of Acandí, but it is primarily a South American country. The Darién Gap is one division in this area.

== See also ==
- Reunification of Gran Colombia
- Central American Integration System
- List of proposed state mergers
