= Latin Cup (disambiguation) =

The Latin Cup (1949–1957) is a former international association football tournament for club sides from the Latin European nations of France, Italy, Portugal and Spain.

Latin Cup may also refer to:

- Latin Cup (basketball) (1953–1966), international tournament for club sides from France, Italy, Portugal, Spain and Switzerland.
- Latin Cup (roller hockey) (1956–2018), international tournament held by the youth (under-23) national teams of France, Italy, Portugal and Spain.
- Latin Cup (rugby union) (1995 and 1997), international tournament for the national teams of Argentina, France, Italy and Romania.
- Copa Latina (beach soccer) (1998–2011), international tournament for national teams, organized by Brazil.
- Volleyball Copa Latina (2009–2015), international tournament for women national teams, organized by Peru.

== See also ==
- Pan-Latinism
- Latin Union (1954–2012), an international organization of Latin countries
- Latin Monetary Union (1865–1927)
