= URSAL =

Union of Socialist Republics of Latin America

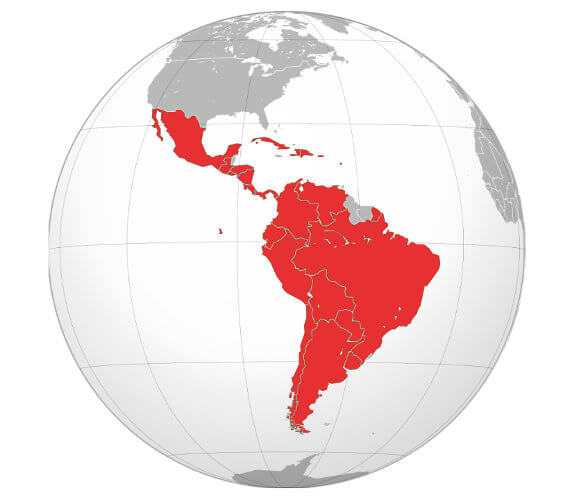
Latin America.

URSAL (Portuguese: União das Repúblicas Socialistas da América Latina, Union of Socialist Republics of Latin America) is a term coined in 2001 by Brazilian sociologist Maria Lúcia Victor Barbosa to mock criticism from left-wing politicians and intellectuals with regards to the proposed Free Trade Area of the Americas. The expression was taken seriously by some Brazilian right-wingers, including Olavo de Carvalho, and resurfaced on YouTube and other media as a supposed Latin American integration plan backed by the São Paulo Forum.

== Appearances ==
In 2018, during the first Brazilian presidential debate, the then-federal deputy and presidential candidate Cabo Daciolo spoke of URSAL as a plan to end sovereignty in South America while questioning fellow candidate Ciro Gomes. Daciolo said that URSAL would be a socialist federation of Latin American and Caribbean countries.

== See also ==
- Socialism in Brazil
- Cultural Marxism conspiracy theory
- Prometheism
- Freemasonry in Cuba
- Patria Grande, another concept for a united Latin America
