= Confederation of Himalayan States =

- Predecessor: Federation of Sikkim and Bhutan; Gurkhastan; Autonomy for Darjeeling-Dooars District
- Formation: N/A
- Founder: Government of China
- Legal status: Not accepted
- Members: Bhutan; Nagaland; Nepal; North-East Frontier Agency (Kingdom of Sikkim) Sikkim

The Confederation of Himalayan States was a proposed confederation between the independent countries of Bhutan, Nepal and Sikkim, and the Indian areas of Nagaland and the North-East Frontier Agency. It was semi-officially proposed by the government of the People's Republic of China in 1962.

== History ==
Starting in 1956, China made several proposals of unions in the Himalayan Mountains in an attempt to decrease Indian influence in the region. These included the Federation of Sikkim and Bhutan, Gurkhastan, and promises of autonomy for Darjeeling-Dooars District.

Among the last of these attempts came in 1962 with the proposal to form the Confederation of Himalayan States. The proposal seemed "encouraging from a Chinese point of view," and each country and region attempted to pursue this to varying levels of success. Oddly enough, the proposal also included the regions of Kashmir, Ladakh, Arunachal, and Nagaland—all regions administered by India, with the exception of Pakistani Kashmir.

To the horror of many other countries, including India, some leaders and groups in control of the countries included in the proposal seemed in favor of it, trying to leave India's sphere of influence for China's. Any fears of ulterior motives were assuaged with references to China's peaceful border negotiations with Burma, Nepal, and Pakistan, as well as her respect for the independence of Asian states.

== Reactions of proposed members ==
=== Bhutan ===
The Bhutanese prime minister at the time, Jigme Palden Dorji, stated that he was never approached about the idea of a confederation by China, but his government had referred it to him. He advised his government not to accept the proposal for multiple reasons, including their lack of military strength to stand against India or China, and fears of Nepalese dominance in the state.

Citizens of Bhutan felt they were more in favor of the confederation than their government. Plenty of Bhutanese headmen fled to Tibet, and around three thousand Tibetan refugees made their way into Bhutan. The Nepalese citizens of Bhutan expressed their anger with the government, due to their lack of representation.

=== Nagaland ===
During the Naga Conflict, India created the Naga People's Convention, an attempt to accept the Nagas as citizens of a new Indian state. The Naga-elected and supported Naga National Council, outlawed by India, said that they much preferred China's proposal over India's, not wanting "annexation and genocide" in Nagaland.

=== Nepal ===
Rishikesh Shah, the Finance Minister of Nepal, cautiously admitted to other Nepalese officials that he knew of the existence of the proposal and that the matter had been discussed. He also said that he had information, but no evidence, that China had been putting pressure on the Communist Party of Nepal to push the item of the confederation to the top of their agenda. Chinese people had been moving to Nepal en-masse for several years, leading to a vibrant exchange of culture and aid, despite Nepal's reluctance to establish diplomatic relations with China.

=== North-East Frontier Agency ===
During the Naga Conflict, the "free Nagas" claimed that over 100,000 Nagas were killed, and a further 400,000 were placed into concentration camps. This led to deep resentment of Indians among Nagas, and cries for an "Eastern Hills Frontier State." There was no talk about the confederation among the government.

=== Sikkim ===
The Sikkim State Congress claimed that any Indian treaty would be imposed by force, fearing that the royal family would be placed back into power. However, they also did not have any sympathy for China, as the government was all too aware of what was happening in Tibet. The President of the Sikkim National Congress Party, Kazi Lhendup Dorjee, said that China had attempted to advance ideas of the confederation both through Nepalis visiting Sikkim, usually communist sympathizers, as well as directly to himself. He said that the proposal was "Sikkim's only hope and that he [was] completely in favor of it."
