= Samoan unification =

Hypothetical political union of Samoa and American Samoa

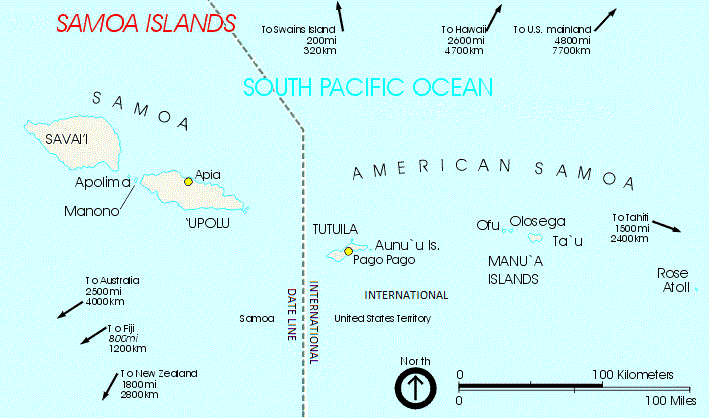
Samoan Islands; Samoa in the west and American Samoa in the east.

The political union of Samoa (an independent state previously known as Western Samoa) and American Samoa (a US territory also known as Eastern Samoa), both of which are part of the Samoan Islands, has been proposed ever since their current status was established under the Tripartite Convention of 1899. In 1919, the former German Samoa expressed a desire to unite with American Samoa. The Samoan people in both Western Samoa and American Samoa share ethnicity and culture, but their islands have remained politically separated. After World War I, the western islands became the Territory of Western Samoa under the administration of New Zealand, a League of Nations mandate from 1920 to 1946 and a United Nations trust territory from 1946 to 1962. The Inter-Samoan Consultative Committee was established in 1955 to promote cooperation between the two. Richard Barrett Lowe, the governor of American Samoa from 1953 to 1956, said during his tenure that it had been decided that reunification with Western Samoa was not to be discussed by the Committee. In 1969, a political commission in American Samoa rejected a proposal for unification with Western Samoa.

Sentiments for and against unification exist in varying degrees. Nevertheless, some Western Samoan political leaders have argued in favor either of unification or of making Western Samoa an American Trust Territory. Although inhabitants of American Samoa have a strong Samoan national identity, there is no large movement among them in favor of independence or unification with Western Samoa. American Samoa protested Western Samoa's official name change to "Samoa" in 1997, concerned that it would imply that Samoa has authority over all the Samoan islands, including American Samoa.

== See also ==
- Samoan crisis of the 1880s
- Unification of Saint Martin

== Sources ==
- Lowe, Richard Barrett (1967). Problems in paradise: the view from Government House. Pageant Press.
- Felix Maxwell Keesing; Marie Margaret Keesing (1956). Elite Communication in Samoa: A Study of Leadership. Stanford University Press. pp. 250–. GGKEY:RYT6ENFUQFE.
- Paul Kennedy (1 July 2013). The Samoan Tangle: A Study in Anglo-German-American Relations 1878–1900. University of Queensland Press. pp. 3–. ISBN 978-1-921902-07-9.
- Katarina Ferro; Margot Wallner; Richard Bedford (31 December 2006). Migration happens: reasons, effects and opportunities of migration in the South Pacific. Lit. ISBN 978-3-8258-6998-4.
