= Reunification of Gran Colombia =

Merger of Colombia, Venezuela, Ecuador, and Panama

Spanish Name
- Reunificación de la Gran Colombia

Reunification of Gran Colombia refers to the hypothetical future reunification of Colombia, Venezuela, Ecuador, and Panama under a single government. Although Gran Colombia only existed for 12 years and dissolved in the 19th century, interest and efforts in reunification were expressed as early as 1903 when Panama separated from Colombia. People in favor of reunification are called "unionistas" or unionists. In 2008, President of Venezuela Hugo Chávez announced a proposal for the political restoration of Gran Colombia, under the Bolivarian Revolution.

== Politics ==
Some media commentators believe that a reunified Gran Colombia could become a global economic powerhouse. That would contrast with Gran Colombia in the 1820s, whose economy was mostly agrarian and had little industry. It was speculated by the BBC that if Gran Colombia existed in 2017, it would have had a population of 96 Million people and an estimated gross domestic product of US$952 Billion.

In 2025, the President of Colombia, Gustavo Petro proposed a restoration of Gran Colombia. He proposed that the reunited state would operate as a confederation with protected autonomy of the individual member countries but operate under a shared trade policy and citizenship. When he attended the inauguration of the President of Ecuador, Daniel Noboa he discussed the possibility of opening up a dialogue on it. He believed it would promote South American security following the United States seizing Venezuelan oil tankers. In 2026, he proposed national referendums in each potential member country on the reunification of Gran Colombia.

Flag	Arms	Name	Area (km^{2})	Population in 2024	GDP PPP Estimate	Capital	GDP (PPP) per capita
(Colombia)		Colombia	1,141,748	52,886,363	$714.003 Billion	Bogotá	$14,552
(Ecuador)		Ecuador	283,560	18,135,478	$193.138 Billion	Quito	$11,617
(Panama)		Panama	75,517	4,515,577	$100.194 Billion	Panama	$42,772
(Venezuela)		Venezuela	916,445	28,405,543	$409.389 Billion	Caracas	$12,388
Total			2,417,270	103,942,961	$1.416 Trillion		$13,792

== See also ==
- Central American reunification
- List of proposed state mergers
