= Pan-nationalism =

Nationalism beyond national boundaries

Pan-nationalism (from Ancient Greek πᾶν (pân) 'all' and French nationalisme 'nationalism') in the social sciences includes forms of nationalism that aim to transcend (overcome, expand) traditional boundaries of basic or historical national identities in order to create a "higher" pan-national (all-inclusive) identity, based on various common denominators. In relation to classical state nationalism, pan-nationalism manifests itself through various political movements that advocate the formation of "higher" (pan-national) forms of political identity, based on a regional or continental grouping of national states, such as Pan-Africanism, Pan-Americanism, Pan-Arabism, Pan-Asianism, Pan-Slavism, and Pan-Turkism. In terms of ethnic nationalism, pan-nationalism can also manifest itself through specific ethnic movements that advocate setting up "higher" (pan-national) forms of common identity that are based on ethnic grouping (for example: Pan-Germanism or Pan-Slavism). Other forms of nationalism also have their pan-national variants.

Some forms of pan-nationalism, such as Pan-Germanism, manifest themselves on two levels: wider - relating to the unity of all Germanic peoples - and narrower - relating to the unity of all ethnic Germans, also including (on either of those two levels) German-speaking Austrians and German-speaking Swiss people, many of who may not self-identify as strictly "German", while still belonging to the wider family of contemporary Germanic peoples.

== History and outcomes ==
Pan-nationalism emerged from the nineteenth-century European nationalism, beginning with the Pan-Slavism movement, which developed among various Slavic nations within the Austro-Hungarian and Turkish empires. At the heart of this development was Ján Kollár, who maintained that the Slavs were a fundamentally single people, sharing the same cultural heritage. This was later followed by the Pan-German thought, which assumed a somewhat similar view, with a goal of German unification where a greater Germany can be created, including Austrians and other German speakers. These pan-nationalistic movements embraced the European intellectual discourses on race, particularly those about the preservation of the racial unit. This gave the concept a mantle of permanence because it called upon a biological connection that bound a "Volk" together.

Pan-nationalism implies that the national group is dispersed over several existing states. It is not identical to irredentism – nationalist claims on adjoining territories on the grounds that they form part of the national homeland. Scale is a factor here, however. Greater Albania, even in the largest version, would still be a small country. An irredentist Greater Germany, even if it is limited to contiguous German-speaking regions, would have about 100 million inhabitants. Pan-nationalism is not the same as diaspora nationalism, such as Zionism, which implies the concentration of a dispersed group on an ancestral homeland. Colonies (other than settler colonies) fall outside most definitions of a nation, since both coloniser and colonised recognise that they share no ethnicity, culture, and language.

Nationalist movements in large nations, such as the German and Russian nations, are therefore difficult to distinguish from pan-nationalist movements, and often there are explicitly pan-nationalist elements. Aside from these cases, however, most pan-nationalist movements failed. Specifically pan-national states are rare. Yugoslavia attempted to unify a category of South Slavs, the prefix "jugo" means "south". After 1945, it did recognise separate internal nations within a federal structure.

Other large states are difficult to classify as pan-national. Around 1942 Nazi Germany controlled a vast collection of annexed territories, German-administered civilian entities, puppet states, collaborationist states, and front-line areas run by the military. The conquests were partly inspired by the idea of Lebensraum, but that is not in itself a pan-nationalist concept. The Soviet Union had a Soviet identity, but no "Soviet" ethnicity, culture, or language. It was influenced by pan-Russian ideas, but also by other geopolitical ideals which implied a large territory. China has a long tradition of cultural and administrative unity. (The fact that both China and India annexed territories does not necessarily make the state pan-national in character.)

The general failure of the pan-nationalist movements is illustrated by several examples, which had a clear idea of their ideal state, but never got anywhere near achieving it. Modern Turkey is the former core area of the Ottoman Empire. The present state is closely modelled on the classic European nation state, and was a deliberate break with that empire. Beside the very strong Turkish nationalism there are three pan-nationalisms. In ascending order of scale: pan-Turkism, a sometimes distinct pan-Turkic ideology referring to the Turkic peoples, and pan-Turanism, which covers most of central Asia and even Finland and Hungary. As in Turkey, pan-nationalist movements often operate on the margin of a more limited "standard-nationalist" movement, in the existing core area of the claimed mega-state.

Pan-Slavism is another notable example of an influential ideal that never resulted in the corresponding mega-state – if Russian territory was included, it would extend from the Baltic to the Pacific (west to east) and right down to central Asia and the Caucasus/Black Sea/Mediterranean in the south.

Pan-Americanism as an ideal was influential around the time of the independence movements in Latin America. However, the new nation-states soon diverged in policy and interests, and no federation emerged. The term acquired another meaning, namely U.S.-led co-operation among the separate nation-states, with a connotation of U.S. hegemony. That is why there is a pan-Latin-Americanism which proposes inter-Americanism with the United States. An important exponent of this philosophy is Víctor Raúl Haya de la Torre, from Peru, while Bolivarianism represents a current variation on the theme.

Pan-Arabism favors the unification of the countries of the Arab world, from the Atlantic Ocean to the Arabian Sea.

Pan-Islamism favors the unification of all Muslims, unlike most traditional pan-nationalist movements this is not based on race or ethnicity because it has been revitalised with religion at its core.

== Recent developments ==
Thomas Hegghammer of the Norwegian Defence Research Establishment has outlined the emergence of "macro-nationalism" in the late Cold War era, which kept a low profile until the September 11 attacks. Hegghammer traces the origins of modern macro-nationalism to both the Western counter-jihad movement and Islamist terrorist organisations such as al-Qaeda. In the aftermath of the 2011 Norway attacks, he described the ideologies of perpetrator Anders Behring Breivik as "not fitting the established categories of right-wing ideology, like white supremacism, ultranationalism or Christian fundamentalism", but more akin to a "doctrine of civilisational war that represents the closest thing yet to a Christian version of Al-Qaeda".

== List of Pan-nationalisms ==
- Pan-Africanism
- Pan-Americanism
- Pan-Arabism
- Pan-Asianism
- Pan-Caucasianism
- Pan-Celticism
- Pan-Dravidianism
- Pan-Finnicism
- Pan-European nationalism
- Pan-European identity
- Pan-Germanicism
  - Pan-Germanism
- Panhellenism (Note: Sometimes used in the sense of the Megali Idea, a subset of irredentism rather than pan-nationalism.)
- Pan-Iranism
- Pan-Indianism
- Pan-Latinism
  - Pan-Hispanism
  - Pan-Iberism
- Pan-Mongolism
- Pan-Netherlands
- Pan-Oceanian
- Pan-Scandinavianism
- Pan-Slavism
  - West Slavic: Czechoslovakism, Zadrugism
  - East Slavic: West Russianism, Galician Russophilia
  - South Slavic: Yugoslavism
- Pan-Thaiism
- Pan-Turanianism
- Pan-Turkism

== See also ==
- Panethnicity
- British Unionism
- Canzuk
- Composite nationalism
- Europe a Nation
- Expansionist nationalism
- Fourth Reich
- GEACPS
- Greater Finland
- Greater Romania
- Hungarian irredentism
- Indian nationalism
- Irredentism
- Pan-Latinamericanism
- Megali Idea
- Neo-nationalism
- Galicia irredenta
- Pan-Catalanism
- Pan-Huiism
- Pan-Italianism
- Pan-Somalism
- Patria Grande
- Sinosphere
- United Ireland
- White Unity
- United States of Europe
- World government
