= Latin American integration =

Political and economic integration of Latin American states

The integration of Latin America (also called Latin Americanism) has a history going back to Spanish American and Brazilian independence, when there was discussion of creating a regional state or confederation of Latin American nations to protect the area's newly won autonomy. After several projects failed, the issue was not taken up again until the late 19th century, but now centered on the issue of international trade and with a sense of Pan-Americanism, owing to the United States taking a leading role in the project. The idea of granting these organizations a primarily political purpose did not become prominent again until the post-World War II period, which saw both the start of the Cold War and a climate of international cooperation that led to the creation of institutions such as the United Nations. It would not be until the mid-20th century that uniquely Latin American organizations were created.

== 19th century precedents ==
At the end of the wars of independence (1808–1825), many new sovereign states emerged in the Americas from the former Spanish colonies. The South American independence leader Simón Bolívar envisioned various unions that would ensure the independence of Spanish America vis-à-vis the European powers—in particular the United Kingdom—and the expanding United States. Already in his 1815 Cartagena Manifesto, Bolívar advocated that the Spanish American provinces should present a united front to the Spanish in order to prevent their being re-conquered piecemeal, though he did not yet propose a political union of any kind. During the wars of independence, the fight against Spain was marked by only an incipient sense of nationalism. It was unclear what the new states that replaced the Spanish monarchy should be. Most of those who fought for independence identified with both their birth provinces and Spanish America as a whole, both of which they referred to as their patria, a term which incorporates meanings contained today in the English words "fatherland" and "homeland".

As Bolívar made advances against royalist forces, he began to propose the creation of various large states and confederations, inspired by Francisco de Miranda's idea of an independent state consisting of all of Spanish America, which Miranda variously called "Colombia", the "American Empire" or the "American Federation". In 1819, Bolívar was able to successfully create a nation called "Colombia" (today referred to as Gran Colombia) out of several Spanish American provinces; in 1825, he proposed joining it to Peru and Upper Peru in a confederation or state that he suggested be called the "Bolivian Federation" or "Bolivian Union" and which historians refer to as the "Andean Confederation", but this never came about.

Other large states that emerged from the disintegration of the Spanish Monarchy also failed to prove long-lived. The Federal Republic of Central America, created out of the former Captaincy General of Guatemala, ceased to exist in 1840. The United Provinces of South America was never viable and suffered from nearly constant civil war between its provinces and the capital, Buenos Aires. Argentina would not become united until the 1850s. The 1836 attempt to reunite the key regions of the former Viceroyalty of Peru in a Peru-Bolivian Confederation fell apart after three years. Only Mexico, which consisted of the core areas of the Viceroyalty of New Spain remained as a physically large state in Latin America. The other regional exception was the Kingdom of Brazil, which declared independence in 1822 as the Empire of Brazil after the Portuguese demanded the return of the Portuguese king and court from Rio de Janeiro.

Bolívar also proposed a separate league of the newly independent Spanish American republics, and to this end organized the Amphictyonic Congress or the Congress of Panama in 1826. Bolívar did not invite Brazil, since it was a monarchy and he saw it as a threat to the new republics' existence, nor did he invite the government at Buenos Aires, since the region lacked any real political unity to effectively be represented. Only after pressure was placed on him was the United States invited to the congress, but one representative died en route and the other arrived after deliberations were concluded. The United Kingdom was present only as an observer. The congress did draft a "Treaty of Union, League, and Perpetual Confederation", a pact of mutual defense and commerce, but only Gran Colombia ratified it. Gran Colombia itself fell apart in 1830. Because of these failed projects, Latin American politicians often speak of regional integration as "Bolivar's dream".

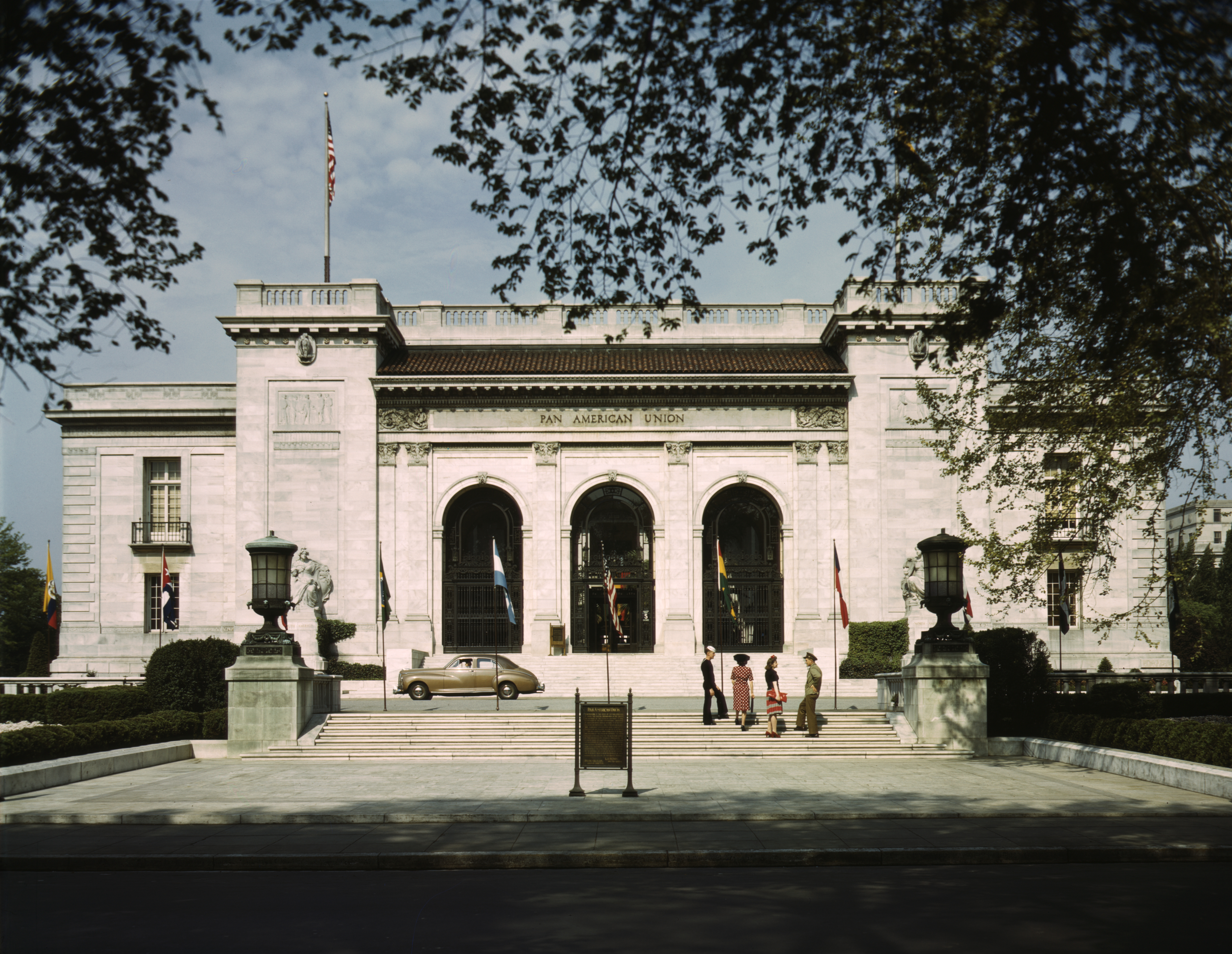
The Pan American Union headquarters building in Washington, D.C. in 1943.

Sixty-three years after the Amphictyonic Congress, a secretariat, the Commercial Bureau of the American Republics, was created by eighteen Pan-American nations in 1889 at the First Pan-American Conference to promote trade in the western hemisphere. The Commercial Bureau began functioning on 14 April 1890. The bureau was renamed the International Commercial Bureau at the Second International Conference of 1901–1902. At the Fourth Pan-American Conference in 1910, the name of the organization was changed to the Union of American Republics and the International Commercial Bureau became the Pan American Union.

== 20th century ==
The experience of World War II convinced hemispheric governments that unilateral action by one nation could not ensure the territorial integrity of the Pan-American nations in the event of extra-continental aggression, in particular Soviet or communist incursions. To meet the challenges of global conflict in the Cold War period and to contain conflicts within the hemisphere, they adopted a system of collective security, the Inter-American Treaty of Reciprocal Assistance, popularly known as the Rio Treaty, in 1947. The following year, at the Ninth International Conference of American States, headed by U.S. Secretary of State George Marshall, twenty-one member states pledged to fight communism in the Americas, and transformed the Pan American Union into the Organization of American States (OAS). The transition was smooth. The Director General of the Pan American Union, Alberto Lleras Camargo, became the OAS's first Secretary General and the organization began functioning in December 1951.

By the late twentieth century, many Latin American leaders saw a need for an alternative organization that was not dominated by the United States. The experience of dealing with the 1970s and 1980s communist insurgencies in Central America through the creation of the Contadora Group, which did not include the United States, inspired the creation of the Rio Group in 1986. The Rio Group did not create a secretariat or permanent body and instead chose to rely on yearly summits of heads of states.

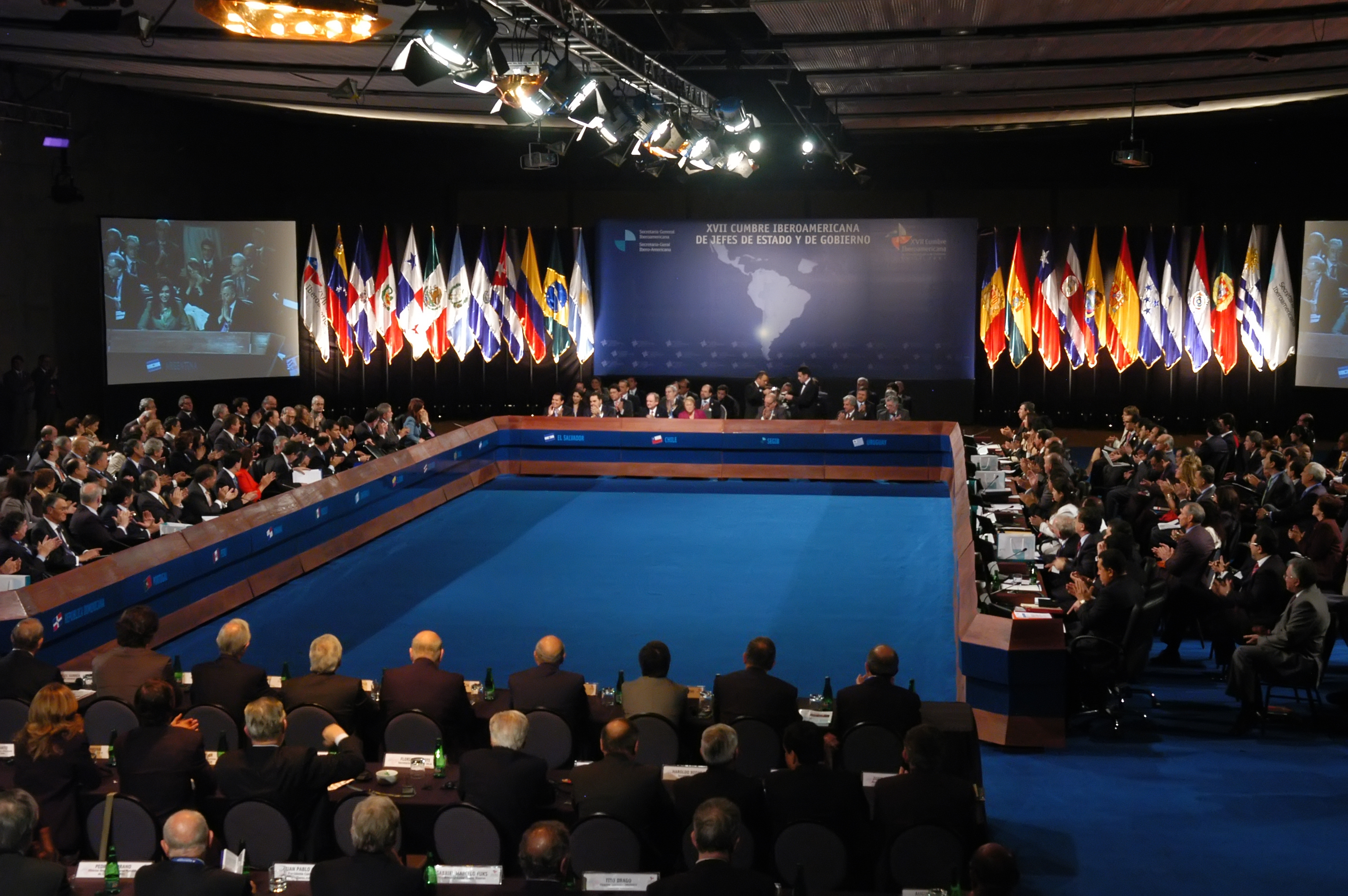
The 2007 Ibero-American Summit in Santiago, Chile.

Latin America also reached out to Europe, in particular its former colonial mother countries, to create other regional organizations based around common languages and cultures. In 1991 the governments of Mexico, Brazil and Spain organized the First Ibero-American Summits of Heads of State and Governments in Guadalajara, Mexico. The result was the creation of the Iberoamerican Community of Nations, which holds yearly summits of its heads of state.

== Latin American organizations ==
Trade, not politics, also served as the principal issue around which various, uniquely Latin American regional organizations were formed. On 14 October 1951, the governments of Costa Rica, El Salvador, Guatemala, Honduras, and Nicaragua signed a new treaty creating the Organization of Central American States (Organización de Estados Centroamericanos, or ODECA) to promote regional cooperation, integration and unity in Central America. This led to the creation of the Central American Common Market, the Central American Bank for Economic Integration, and the Secretariat for Central American Economic Integration (SIECA) nine years later on 13 December 1960.

Other regional trade blocs were also established in this period. The Latin American Free Trade Association (ALALC) was formed by the 1960 Treaty of Montevideo, which was signed by Argentina, Brazil, Chile, Mexico, Paraguay, Peru, and Uruguay. The signatories hoped to create a common market in Latin America and offered tariff rebates among member nations. Its main goal was to eliminate all duties and restrictions on the majority of their trade within a twelve-year period. ALALC came into effect on 2 January 1962. Inspired by the European Communities, in 1980 the ALALC was transformed into the Latin American Integration Association (ALADI) by the second Treaty of Montevideo to pursue the more ambitious goal of improving the economic and social development of the region through the establishment of the common market.

In 1969 the Andean Pact was founded by Chile, Bolivia, Peru, Ecuador and Colombia. In 1973, the pact gained its sixth member, Venezuela. In 1976, however, its membership was again reduced to five when Chile withdrew. Venezuela announced its withdrawal in 2006, reducing the Andean Community to four member states. The name of the organization was changed to the Andean Community of Nations (CAN) in 1996. In 1985 the presidents of Argentina and Brazil signed the Argentina-Brazil Integration and Economics Cooperation Program. This eventually led to the founding of Mercosur by Brazil, Paraguay, Uruguay and Argentina in 1991 to promote free trade and the fluid movement of goods, people, and currency. Venezuela joined Mercosur in 2012 and Bolivia is an acceding member. In 1995 Mexico, Colombia and Venezuela created the G3 Free Trade Agreement. Venezuela left the G3 in 2006 at the same time it left the CAN. In addition to these trade organizations, several parliamentary organizations have been created. Mercosur agreed in December 2004 to create a Mercosur Parliament, which should begin functioning in 2010. A Latin American Parliament was created in 1964, which is located in Panama City.

In December 2004 Mercosur and the Andean Community of Nations signed a reciprocal associate-member status agreement and issued the Cusco Declaration stating that they would create a political South American Community of Nations. The Declaration purposely invoked "Bolívar's dream," noting that it would be partially realizing his vision of uniting Latin America. The original name of the union was changed to the current one, the Union of South American Nations in April 2007.

The Community of Latin American and Caribbean States (CELAC) created in 2010 is an example of a decade-long push for deeper integration within Latin America without United States and Canada. CELAC was created to deepen Latin American integration and by some to reduce the significant influence of the United States on the politics and economics of Latin America. It is seen as an alternative to the Organization of American States (OAS), the regional body that was founded by United States and 21 other Latin American nations originally as a countermeasure to potential Soviet influence in the region.

Following the 2011 Declaration de Lima, the Pacific Alliance was established in 2012 by the founding members Chile, Colombia, Mexico and Peru. As of 2015, Costa Rica is in the process of joining. While membership is currently exclusively Latin American, a potential membership application by Canada is being considered favorably by some.

In 2021 and 2022, Andrés Manuel López Obrador, president of Mexico, advocated for a regional union, comprising the nations of the Americas, resembling the European Union.

== Organization membership ==
Country	OAS	CELAC	ACS	Caricom	OECS	UNASUR	PROSUR	CAN	MERCOSUR	LAP	LAIA	LAES	RG	SICA	ALBA	PA
Canada	x		o													o
United States	x															o
Mexico	x	x	x	o		o				x	x	x	x			x
Guatemala	x	x	x							x	o	x	x	x		o
El Salvador	x	x	x							x	o	x	x	x		o
Honduras	x	x	x							x	o	x	x	x		o
Nicaragua	x	x	x							x	o	x	x	x	x	
Costa Rica	x	x	x							x	o	x	x	x		a
Dominican Republic	x	x	x	o						x	o	x	x	a		o
Panama	x	x	x			o				x	o	x	x	x		o
Cuba		x	x							x	x	x	x		x	
Venezuela	x	x	x	o		x			x	x	x	x	x		x	
Colombia	x	x	x	o			x	x	a	x	x	x	x			x
Ecuador	x	x	o				x	x	a	x	x	x	x		x	
Peru	x	x	o			s	x	x	a	x	x	x	x			x
Chile	x	x					x	x	a	x	x	x	x		x	
Bolivia	x	x	o			x		a	a	x	x	x	x			x
Paraguay	x	x	o				x	a	x	x	x	x	x			
Uruguay	x	x						a	x	x	x	x	x		o	o
Argentina	x	x					x	a	x	x	x	x	x		o	o
Brazil	x	x	o				x	a	x	x	x	x	x			
Antigua and Barbuda	x	x	x	x	x										x	
Bahamas	x	x	x	x								x				
Barbados	x	x	x	x								x				
Belize	x	x	x	x								x	x	x		
Dominica	x	x	x	x	x										x	o
Grenada	x	x	x	x	x							x			o	
Guyana	x	x	x	x		x	x					x	x			
Haiti	x	x	x	x								x	x		o	
Jamaica	x	x	x	x								x	x			
Saint Kitts and Nevis	x	x	x	x	x											
Saint Vincent and the Grenadines	x	x	x	x	x										x	
Saint Lucia	x	x	x	x	x											
Suriname	x	x	x	x		x				x		x	x			
Trinidad and Tobago	x	x	x	x								x				o
Montserrat				x	x											
Anguilla				a	a											
Bermuda				a												
British Virgin Islands				a	a											
Cayman Islands				a												
Turks and Caicos Islands			a	a												
Aruba			a	o												
Curaçao			a													
Netherlands			a	o												
Sint Maarten			a	o												
France	o		a													o
Puerto Rico				o												
U.S. Virgin Islands																
map																
map with observers																
Country	OAS	CELAC	ACS	Caricom	OECS	UNASUR	PROSUR	CAN	MERCOSUR	LAP	LAIA	LAES	RG	SICA	ALBA	PA

Legend: [x - member] — [a - associate or acceding] — [o - observer]

x - member; o - observer; a - associate/acceding

== Public support ==
Public support for Latin American integration is generally high but has been declining in many South and Central American countries over time. According to one study based on Latinobarómetro data, 73% of Latin Americans support economic integration and 63% support political integration in Latin America. It was also found that in most Latin American countries (twelve out of seventeen), support for economic integration was lower in 2010 than in 1997 and support for political integration decreased in nearly all countries (14 out of 17) between 2002 and 2010. Support for economic and political integration is higher among men than among women and increases with educational level. Coinciding with the shift to the left in Latin American politics (pink tide), the political left surpassed the right and, at least in the case of support for political integration, also the center, to become the political wing favoring integration most highly. That trend is a divergence from the picture found in Europe for support of European integration, which is generally highest among the political center.

== See also ==
- Antillean Confederation
- Community of Latin American and Caribbean States
- European integration
- Organization of Ibero-American States
- Panhispanism
- Pan-Americanism
- Pan-Latinism
- Patria Grande
- Regional integration

== Bibliography ==
- Rivera, Salvador. 'Latin American Unification: A History of Political and Economic Integration Efforts. North Carolina: McFarland Press, 2014.
- Rivera, Salvador. "Jacob K. Javits and Latin American Economic Integration". Cuaderno de Negocios Internacionales e Integración 13. No. 64/65. July–December 2007.
