= Pan-Latinism =

Ideology promoting unification of Romance peoples

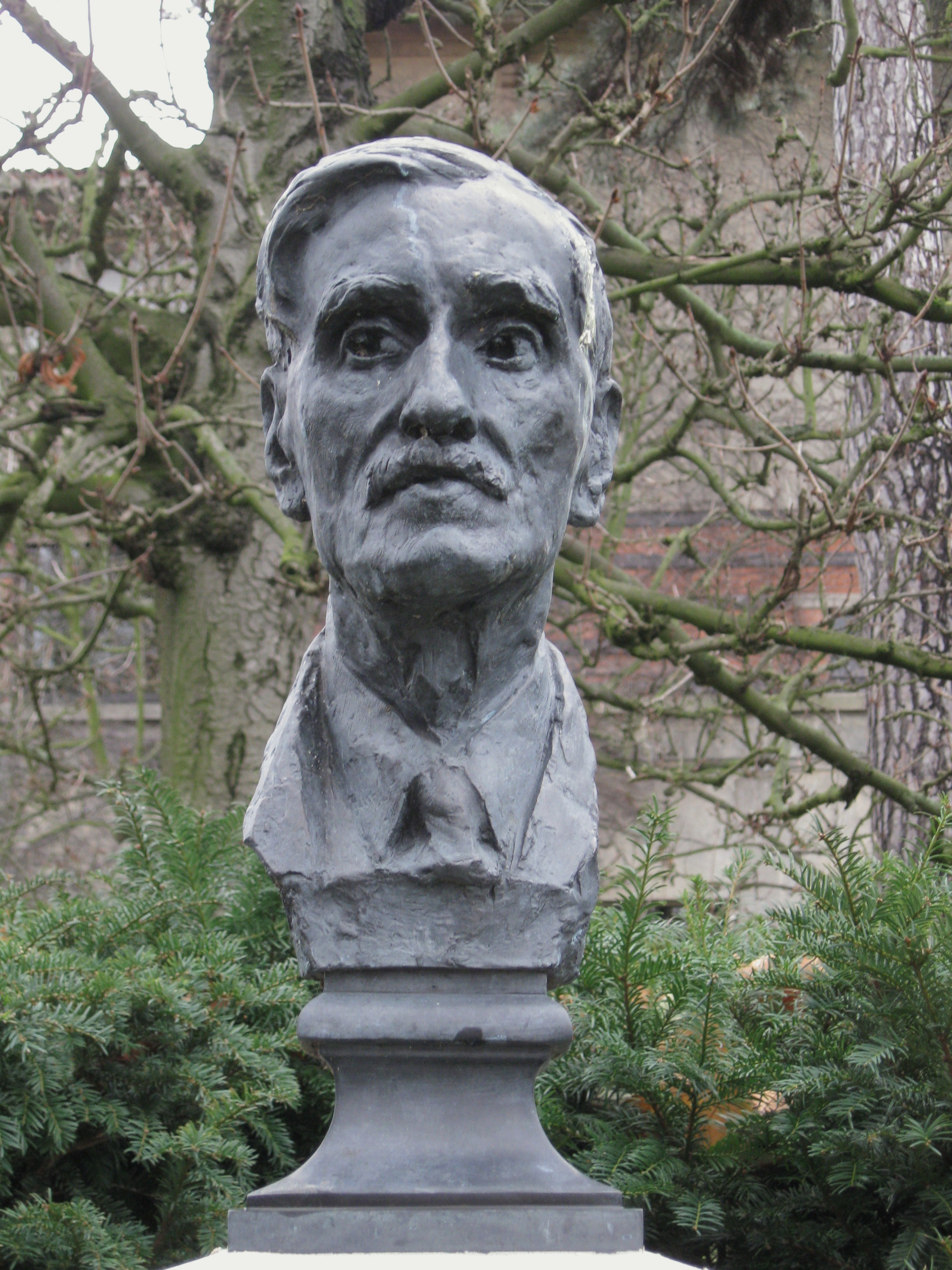
Bust of Jean Charles-Brun, a proponent of international pan-Latinism and a Latin Confederation

Pan-Latinism is an ideology that promotes the unification of the Romance-speaking peoples. Pan-Latinism first rose to prominence in France particularly from the influence of Michel Chevalier (1806–1879) who contrasted the "Latin" peoples of the Americas with the "Anglo-Saxon" peoples there. Nineteenth-Century French writer Stendhal spoke of "Latinism" as an imperial idea that the Latins should rule over their non-Latin neighbours. It was later adopted by Napoleon III, who declared support for the cultural unity of Latin peoples and presented France as the modern leader of the Latin peoples to justify French intervention in Mexican politics that led to the creation of the pro-French Second Mexican Empire. Sociologist René Maunier writes that the medieval Italian poet Dante toyed with the idea of European domination by Latins in his treatise De Monarchia, which celebrated the "world empire" of the Romans.

In the aftermath of France's defeat in the Franco-Prussian War and the creation of a state of Germany, the French political theorist Gabriel Hanotaux rejected claims that the era of imperial dominance of the Latin peoples, particularly the French, was over and that the new era was one of imperial dominance of the Anglo-Saxon, Germanic and Slavic peoples. Hanotaux claimed that the Latin peoples had an imperial role to play in colonization of Africa, and that they should have imperial holdings including Africa and South America. The Anglo-Saxon peoples' imperial holdings should be North America, the Germanic peoples should have Central Europe, and the Slavic peoples should have Siberia.

A democratic and confederal form of pan-Latinism arose through the influence of Occitan French figure Frédéric Mistral, who advocated regional autonomy for Occitania in France. He also advocated pan-Latinism after he had contacted Catalans who supported autonomy of Catalonia alongside Latin unity. Mistral influenced Jean Charles-Brun, whose Le régionalisme, in turn, impressed Mistral. Charles-Brun advocated an international Latinism and the creation of a democratic confédération latine ("Latin Confederation") but rejected proposals of a "Latin Empire".

In 1927, The New York Times published an article on pan-Latinism which states, "activities of the United States Government in Central America, as exemplified by the landing of marines in Nicaragua and by the proposed Panama and Nicaragua protectorate treaties, have given strong impetus, momentarily, to the incipient Pan-Latin movement" and defined "Latinity" as consisting of "the peoples of France, Italy, Spain, Portugal, Rumania, Southern Switzerland, Southeastern Belgium, French Canada and Latin America".

== See also ==
- Latin Union (1954–2012), international organization of Latin countries
- Latin Monetary Union (1865–1927)
- Latin Bloc (proposed alliance)
- Latin Axis (World War II)
- Latin Cup, several international sports tournaments among Latin countries
- Hispanidad
- Iberism
- Mediterraneanism
- Panhispanism
- Pan-nationalism
- Patria Grande
- Greater Romania
- Romance-speaking Europe
- United States of Latin Africa
- La Raza
