= Nicolae Petrescu-Comnen =

Romanian diplomat, politician, and social scientist

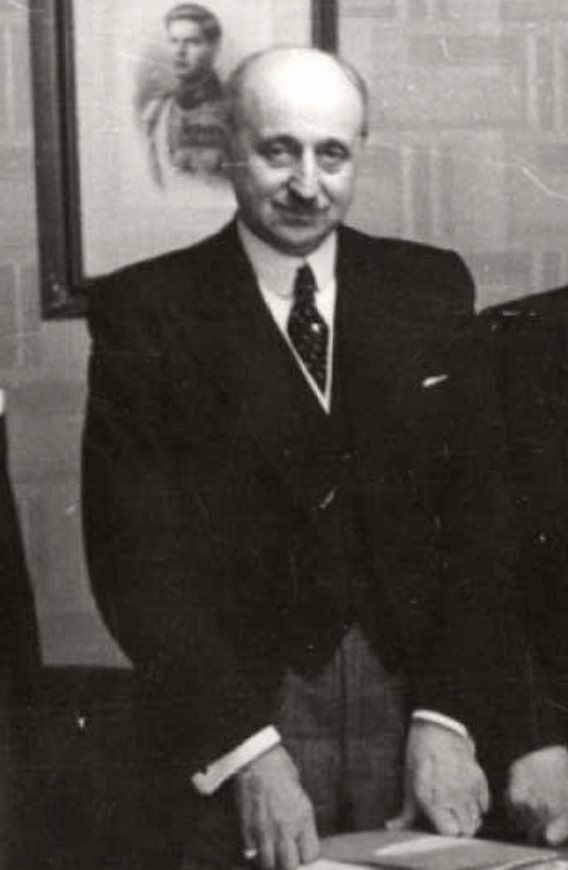
- Petrescu-Comnen in 1938

Foreign Minister of Romania
- In office May 1938 – January 31, 1939
- Monarch: Carol II
- Premier: Miron Cristea

Member of the Assembly of Deputies
- In office November 1919 – May 1920
- In office March 1922 – July 10, 1923
- Constituency: Durostor County

Personal details
- Born: August 24, 1881 Bucharest, Kingdom of Romania
- Died: December 8, 1958 (aged 77) Florence, Italy
- Party: independent
- Other political affiliations: National Liberal Party
- Spouse: Antoinette von Benedek
- Profession: Diplomat, academic, poet
- Nickname: Petrescu-Quand même

Nicolae Petrescu-Comnen (Romanian pronunciation: [nikoˈla.e peˈtresku komˈnen]; Gallicized as Petresco-Comnène, Petrescu-Comnène or N. P. Comnène, born Nicolae Petrescu; August 24, 1881 – December 8, 1958) was a Romanian diplomat, politician and social scientist, who served as Minister of Foreign Affairs in the Miron Cristea cabinet (between May 1938 and January 31, 1939). He debuted in France as a public lecturer and author of several books on political history, then returned to Romania as a judge and member of the University of Bucharest faculty. Comnen spent most of World War I in Switzerland, earning respect at home and abroad for his arguments in favor of nationalism, his publicizing of the Greater Romanian cause, and especially for his support of the Romanian community in Dobruja. During the Paris Peace Conference, he was dispatched to Hungary, proposing political settlements that would have made the Treaty of Trianon more palatable to Hungarian conservatives. Also noted as an eccentric who published poetry, he was often ridiculed for his claim to a Byzantine aristocratic descent from the Komnenos.

Comnen returned to serve briefly in the Romanian Assembly of Deputies, during which time he became a prominent anti-socialist. He was a National Liberal and close to that party's leadership, before embarking on a full-time diplomatic career, originally as Romania's envoy to Switzerland and to the League of Nations (1923–1927). He had a steady climb during the early interwar, with alternating missions in Weimar Germany and at the Holy See. His activity centered on debilitating Hungarian irredentism, and, progressively, on the easing of tensions between Romania and the Soviet Union. As Romania's ambassador to Nazi Germany, Comnen preserved a neutralist line, recognizing Romania's dependence on German industry while seeking to expand cooperation with France and Britain.

Comnen was assigned to lead Foreign Affairs during the early stages of King Carol II's authoritarian regime. His ministerial term was highly turbulent, overlapping with the expansion of Nazi power, Western appeasement, and a sudden deterioration of Romanian–Soviet relations. Comnen recognized the Anschluss, helped "liquidate" the Abyssinian question, and tried to obtain guarantees from Romania's hostile neighbors at Bled and Salonika. A full crisis followed the Munich Agreement, during which Comnen worked to preserve both a Czechoslovak state and the Little Entente. He tacitly gave the Soviet Air Forces access to Romania's airspace, and refused to participate in a partition of Carpathian Ruthenia.

Comnen was ultimately deposed by Carol—allegedly, because he had questioned the king's rationale for repressing the rival Iron Guard—and replaced with Grigore Gafencu. Again dispatched to the Holy See, he was sacked by a Guardist government after Carol's downfall in 1940. He never returned home, but remained in Florence, a supporter of the Allies and agent of the Romanian National Committee. As such, Comnen worked with Gafencu in the diaspora movement against Communist Romania. Earning accolades for his new contributions as a humanitarian, he published works of recollections and studies in diplomatic history. In his last years before his death in Florence, he had turned to promoting a pan-European identity.

== Biography ==
=== Early life ===
Nicolae Petrescu was born in Bucharest on August 24, 1884, the son of a public servant (or magistrate) and his schoolteacher wife. Baptized Romanian Orthodox, he was part-Greek: his maternal grandmother, Ecaterina, was the last descendant of the Greek family Comninò. Also through his mother, hailing from the Cernovodeanu clan, the future diplomat belonged to the boyar nobility, and was an uncle of the historian Dan Cernovodeanu. His collaborator and subordinate Noti Constantinide further argues that Petrescu was of Romany descent, "a true, purebred, Gypsy" and "highly unusual character". Having studied at the University of Bucharest and the University of Paris, he took a doctorate in Law and Political Science at the latter, and began his career as an Ilfov County judge in 1906. He worked as a lawyer from 1911 to 1916, while also teaching economics at Bucharest University. He was at the center of political life from his Paris years, when he joined the Romanian Students' Circle. He lectured with the latter at Voltaire Coffeehouse, appearing alongside some of the country's future statesmen and scholars: Nicolae Titulescu, Ion G. Duca, Dimitrie Drăghicescu, and Toma Dragu.

During that period, he changed his surname to Petrescu-Comnen, thus claiming lineage from the Komnenos family of Byzantine Emperors (he also claimed to be related to the Bonapartes). The change was made official by his father in 1903, and later backed by a questionable family tree and heraldry, but recognized during his induction into the Sacred Military Constantinian Order of Saint George. Petrescu's views on his family's heritage were a frequent topic of ridicule among foreign diplomats (puns on his name included the French-language Petrescu-Quand même—"Petrescu-All the Same", and the generic "Nicolae Perhaps-Comnen"). Historian Andrei Pippidi sees the Byzantine claim as entirely spurious, "snobbish", "unjustly decreasing the value of [his] character." Genealogist Dumitru Năstase proposes that the Petrescus were in fact only attached to the village of Comeni, a name later corrupted into Comneni, then Comnen. The "bewildering" Byzantine pedigree was also ridiculed by the left-wing memoirist Petre Pandrea, who noted that, beyond his "princely obsession", Comnen was a "fundamentally decent man."

Comnen's early work included poetry: in July 1904, his patriotic ode to Iosif Vulcan was carried by the magazine Familia. According to Constantinide, young Petrescu authored a volume of poems which he signed as Petrescu-D'Artagnan. He is known to have published, as Petresco-Comnène, the collection Il était une fois ("Once upon a Time", 1904). Comprising Parnassian verse, it received a lukewarm review from the staff critic at Le Figaro: "the work of a real poet", it nevertheless contained "pages that are quite needlessly bizarre". For a while, this aspect of his literary activity merged with his scholarly work. On June 4, 1905, Le Journal du Dimanche noted his "strange conference" about Albert Samain, which ended with readings from Samain's works by a group of actresses.

Comnen also contributed a study of early Romanian jurisprudence (1902), and a monograph on the history of the Jews in Romania (1905). The latter earned him the Romanian Academy's Ion Heliade Rădulescu award, and special praise from the scholar A. D. Xenopol. He continued in the fields of law and sociology, with a succession of tracts and lectures: Ziua de 8 ore de muncă ("The 8-hour Day", 1906), Accidente profesionale ("Work-related Accidents", 1907), Câteva considerațiuni asupra socialismului și asupra roadelor sale ("Some Musings on Socialism and Its Results", 1909), Studiu asupra intervențiunii statului între capital și muncă ("A Review of State Intervention between Capital and Labor", 1910). These contributions detail Comnen's take on the local labor movement, showing him as a social liberal who fully embraced unionization. Câteva considerațiuni was awarded another Academy prize, and again received a good review from Xenopol.

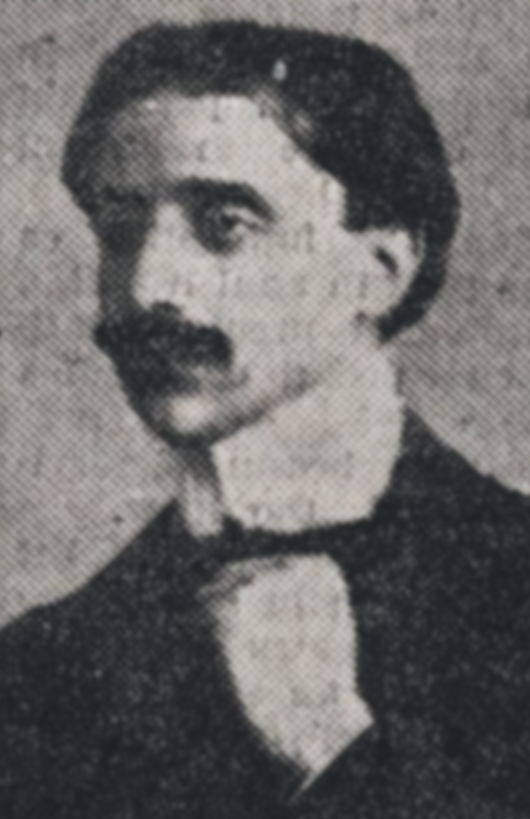
Petrescu-Comnen in 1910

Coat of arms used by Petrescu-Comnen's family

Although Petrescu showed himself to be staunchly against Hungarian nationalism, his wife, Antoinette von Benedek, may have been of Hungarian origin—allegedly, he had her adopted by an impoverished count in Trieste, as a means for the family to inherit a formal title. Other sources simply list her as a Triestine Austrian. They were married on August 4, 1912, at the Russian Cathedral of Paris. The couple already had a son, Raymond-Alexis, born 1908, and a daughter, Elsa-Irène, born 1909. According to Pandrea, neither of the Comnen children shared their father's "obsession". He described both as "my friends", "sensible, unpretentious kids".

=== World War I and aftermath ===
Petrescu-Comnen's career took an upward turn after Romania entered World War I, initially as a noted campaigner for the cause of Greater Romania; he was also tasked with explaining Romania's capitulation. According to Duca, Comnen, "whose precarious health had exiled to Switzerland", matched and surpassed Drăghicescu's similar work in France. He displayed "exquisite skills as a propagandist". He cultivated the friendship of Transylvanians in exile, in particular Aurel Popovici and Iosif Șchiopu, who became his trusted advisers. Initially, Comnen contributed to the cause from a Swiss sanitarium, where he was recovering, hoping to carry forward Popovici's work after the latter had died. With articles in Le Genevois, and with tracts such as Notes sur la guerre roumaine ("Notes on the Romanian War"), he complained about the Entente Powers "sacrificing Romania" after the October Revolution. French scholar Marcel Emerit found his a biased, "unilateral", perspective, containing "a lively condemnation" of the Russian Republic. Comnen also contributed an ethnographic overview of Dobruja (La Dobrogea), just as the region was being absorbed into a Greater Bulgaria. Georges Lacour-Gayet, who presented the work at the Romanian Academy, noted that the "savant work" of "truth and justice", had exposed the practices of Bulgarization.

Comnen received international attention, as well as collaborations from Emil Isac, Constantin Flondor, and Ghiță Popp. He also approached the Czechoslovak National Council and established a working relationship with Edvard Beneš. Eventually settling with his family in Bern, he was delegated to Geneva by Prime Minister Ion I. C. Brătianu, and was later one of Romania's envoys to the Paris Peace Conference. While in Paris, he published the bilingual atlas Roumania through the Ages. La terre roumaine a travers les âges. It was at this time that Comnen became the target of criticism from the far left—communist writer Panait Istrati, who also resided in Switzerland, alleged that Brătianu's delegates Vasile Lucaciu and Petrescu-Comnen were demagogues, preparing the annexation of Transylvania to the "satrap yoke" of the Romanian Kingdom. Petrescu-Comnen's input was valued by the Transylvanian delegate, Alexandru Vaida-Voevod, who kept him as an adviser during meetings with Robert Lansing. By then, Comnen had befriended Lansing's nephew, Allen Dulles.

At this stage, the collapse of Austria-Hungary had ensured the union of Transylvania with Romania; it also sparked a Hungarian–Romanian War, in which Romania faced a Hungarian Soviet Republic. According to Comnen's own account, he met with a deputation of Hungarian conservatives and liberals, including Count Andrássy, Alftred Windisch-Grätz and Mihály Károlyi, who demanded that Romania back their anti-communist government, based in Szeged, and provide support to the "White Guards". In August 1919, Comnen was contacted by another delegation, representing the Hungarian Republic. Comprising István Bethlen, Miklós Bánffy, and Pál Teleki, it asked for Transylvania to be recognized as a federal entity of the Romanian state.

In September, the Artur Văitoianu cabinet, with support from Iuliu Maniu, sent Comnen on mission to Hungary, where he also led the Romanian press office. This experience, in the aftermath of the Soviet Republic, acquainted Petrescu with communism (as detailed by his memoir, published 1957). Residing at Hotel Gellért in Budapest, he left the city with the lifting of Romanian occupation in October 1919. As a hostile National Army moved in, he still expressed his belief that Hungary–Romania relations would be mended and preserved. At the time, he was secretly approached by Bánffy to discuss "reconciliation between the Hungarian and Romanian peoples". Comnen later claimed that he had also reached a friendly agreement with Count Andrássy and other Hungarian conservatives, but that this had been vetoed by Maniu. If accepted, the Hungarian proposal would have led to the establishment of a dual monarchy; Ferdinand I, King of Romania, would have also reigned as Ferdinand VI of Hungary.

Petrescu-Comnen soon joined the National Liberal Party (PNL), and, in the November 1919 election, he won a Durostor County seat in the Assembly of Deputies. He had little connection with his constituency, but was selected by the local party chapter because of his good reputation as an advocate of Dobrujan Romanians. He only took his seat in 1920, when he returned from Paris, and was again reelected in March 1922); throughout these separate terms, he was active on Parliament's Foreign Policy Commission. Vaida-Voevod was Prime Minister of a coalition cabinet formed by the Romanian National Party, the Peasants' Party, and the Democratic Nationalists. Petrescu-Comnen spearheaded the PNL opposition, especially so during March 1920, when he filibustered against the appointment of Nicolae L. Lupu as Interior Minister. He was also noted for proposing legislation that made striking illegal, pressuring the Vaida-Voevod cabinet to look into allegations of Bolshevik influence inside the Socialist Party of Romania. Despite PNL protests and support from the far-right National-Christian Defense League, Petrescu's law was not passed. A disappointed Vaida-Voevod claimed that, with his new career in Parliament, Petrescu had "sacrificed himself" to Brătianu's "politicking".

=== Geneva and Weimar Republic ===
Still active in diplomacy, Petrescu-Comnen had enjoyed a friendly rapport with the Polish Republic and, in 1920, had played a role in negotiating the Polish–Romanian alliance. From 1922 to 1927, he was also a perennial Romanian delegate to the International Labour Organization (ILO). On July 10, 1923, he was named ambassador to Bern, and, in August of that year, also became delegate to the League of Nations; according to Constantinide, he owed this appointment to his political connections. He followed with concern the Locarno Treaties, in which Weimar Germany formally recognized its borders with France and Belgium but not with Poland or Czechoslovakia. Seeing this development as a bad omen, he wanted Romania to align herself with the anti-League Kingdom of Italy as a safeguard, personally befriending Benito Mussolini and Dino Grandi during ILO meetings. He worked with representatives of both Poland and Lithuania against a hostile Soviet Union, which they viewed as a rogue state. When the latter would not adhere to the Convention for the Control of the Trade in Arms and Ammunition, Comnen, Kazimierz Sosnkowski and Dovas Zaunius introduced their own opt-out objections to the Convention.

Alongside Nicolae Titulescu, who took over his seat at the League of Nations, Comnen worked to convince the Entente that Greater Romania was respecting her ethnic minorities. One effort, which also involved Constantin Angelescu and Alexandru C. Constantinescu, involved a defense of Romania's educational programs, confronting propaganda by Albert Apponyi and the "Hungarian bishops". Titulescu and Comnen made a poor impression with British diplomats by producing blunt threats, such as announcing that Romania would individually sue all Hungarian colonists still present in the Banat. However, they convinced the Norwegian inspector Erik Colban that they were acting in good faith. Comnen also called for a negative campaign against the Magyar Party, once the latter had appealed to the League.

Aware of the issues faced by Romanian Hungarians, Jews and other communities, Comnen showed his concern about what this could effect for Greater Romania's image abroad. In 1924, reporting from the League of Nations, he complained that the new Kingdom of Hungary had a tactical advantage: "it is confident that our situation inside the European concert of nations is shakier than that of Czechoslovakia and Yugoslavia, that the situation of minorities is in reality less good than elsewhere, and, finally, that an unfavorable current can be easily determined against us with support from Russia, Jews, Catholics and Protestants the world over". In 1924 and again in 1925, he welcomed in Geneva the Romanian politico Nicolae Iorga, who lectured to an international public about Balkan topics and "imperialism in the Orient".

Early in 1926, a new National Liberal cabinet proposed Petrescu-Comnen for the post of Ambassador to the United States. He adamantly refused, noting that America was "radically incompatible" with his character; he asked instead to be moved to Rome. In the end, he was dispatched to Berlin, which was considered a very difficult mission, suited for his talents. He served there between February 9, 1927 and May 1937, interrupted by a mandate to the Holy See (January 1930 – May 1932). In 1929, Comnen also joined the faculty of The Hague Academy of International Law. During much of 1928, he was also involved in the dispute between Romania and the Kingdom of Bulgaria, reporting to the League of Nations in respect to accusations that his government had encouraged Aromanian violence against Dobrujan Bulgarians, Turks, and Gagauz. The commission, headed by Wang Jingqi, heard Comnen's counterclaim, namely that Bulgaria had sent in Komitadji to attack Aromanian settlers, but repeatedly insisted, and obtained, that Romania prosecute wrongdoers acting on her behalf.

His main contribution during the Weimar period was a German–Romanian Chamber of Commerce. Entirely his "brainchild", it was established in November 1929 with funds pooled by Danatbank, Deutsche Bank, Dresdner Bank, Krupp, and Otto Wolff. From Berlin, Comnen witnessed the diplomatic clashes between Romania and Lithuania; in 1929, Lithuanian envoys expressed their alarm that Romania's collaboration with Poland was also directed against their country. He dismissed the claim, and reassured Lithuania that Romania wanted to act as a mediator in the territorial conflict. As a partisan of Titulescu's policies, Comnen was in favor of normalizing Romanian–Soviet relations, attempting to settle the issue of Bessarabia. As early as 1927, he approached Maxim Litvinov, a Soviet diplomat who served as Foreign Minister. Despite harsh criticism at home over speculations that Romania was dropping her guard, this helped bring about a period of communication between the government of Romania and the Soviets. He also reported that, with backing from Gustav Stresemann, he could solve another major dispute, surrounding the Romanian Treasure, but that his government overseers never let him.

Comnen and his family became close friends with the Apostolic Nuncio to Germany, Eugenio Pacelli. Comnen's stint in Vatican City was prompted by the government reshuffle ordered by Prime Minister Maniu, and disappointed Petrescu-Comnen: he was negotiating an economic treaty with Germany and, moreover, preferred the post of ambassador to Italy. While in Rome, he was primarily noted for protesting against the apparent rapprochement between the Holy See and Hungary, but also for using his position to guess at Mussolini's external policies. He was responsible for obtaining from Pope Pius XI a quick recognition of Carol II as King of Romania, following the latter's coup, and for ending a long-standing dispute surrounding the corporate status of Romanian Roman Catholic churches.

Comnen's contacts in Vatican City informed him of an imminent Soviet attack on Romania, which is supposedly why Maniu massively increased military spending. The latter part of his term coincided with Iorga's premiership: Petrescu-Comnen advised the cabinet not to engage in "violent and hasty" actions against the Hungarian Catholic clergy, while personally ensuring cooperation between the state and the Greek-Rite Catholics. According to Iorga, he was supporting the King and the government, including against the PNL, boasting that he had stopped a PNL propaganda campaign abroad. His dealings with the Holy See were opposed by rival Onisifor Ghibu, who claimed that Petrescu-Comnen was a disgrace to his office.

=== Ambassador to Nazi Germany ===
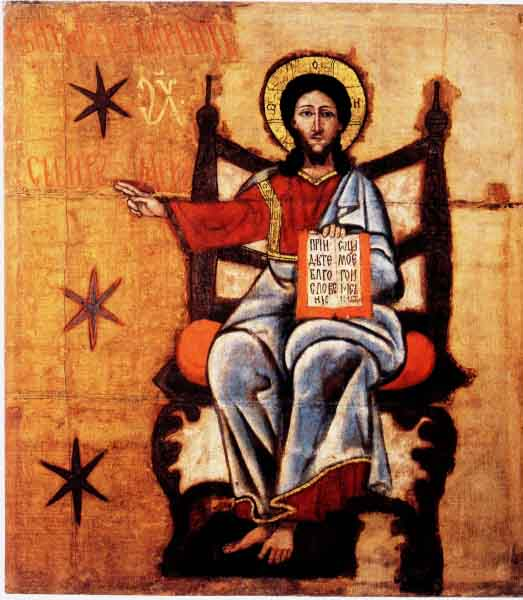
Șerban Cantacuzino's battle flag, returned to Romania by Petrescu-Comnen and Constantin Karadja

Even from Italy, Petrescu-Comnen closely observed the Great Depression and the decline of the Weimar Republic. Already in 1931, while vacationing in Brittany, he had predicted that Germany would fall to communism. His return to Berlin was facilitated by Carol II, who complained that the outgoing ambassador, Gheorghe Tașcă, was "nonexistent". The establishment of a Nazi regime came as a surprise. Petrescu-Comnen was prudent in his contacts with the Nazis, and his diplomatic notes of the time were ambivalent. Former Prime Minister Iorga, who remained friends with Comnen, records that Comnen thought Adolf Hitler "naive and sincere, still learning the ropes."

In an interview with Comnen on May 26, 1933, Hitler "bluntly conditioned the continuation of economic contacts on a change in Romania's political attitude". During 1934, Comnen was still hoping to drive a wedge between German re-armament and Hungarian irredentism, approaching various factions represented in the Hitler Cabinet. In May, he invited Ioan Lupaș of the Romanian Anti-Revisionist League to lecture in Berlin about minority religions in Romania. Later that year, he and consul Constantin Karadja obtained from Hermann Göring a guarantee that Germany would not go to war over Hungary—but this pledge was quickly dismissed by Konstantin von Neurath and Alfred Rosenberg. Rosenberg was persuaded that Comnen, a "Titulescu representative", was lying, and began maneuvering to have him recalled.

Comnen's Russian policy was soon restored by the apparent upset in German–Soviet relations and the Franco-Soviet Treaty of Mutual Assistance. In 1935, Aarne Wuorimaa of Finland probed Comnen's views on Titulescu's Soviet policy. The latter reassured both Germany and Finland that there was no scenario in which Romania and the Soviets would establish a military pact. Though skeptical, Comnen himself preferred this Soviet realignment to the Nazi alternative: his notes of 1936 show him alarmed by the "antisemitic objective" of Nazism (accurately predicting a Kristallnacht), by the regime's public anti-Catholicism, and overall by the "nebulous criteria of German law". Although he viewed the Winter and Summer Olympics as propaganda, Comnen accepted the Olympics Cross, First Class from Hitler. In early 1937, he visited Britain upon King Carol's request, and reported back that he had been able to approach various British statesmen. He and Karadja obtained that Șerban Cantacuzino's battle flag, used in the Siege of Vienna and discovered in Dresden, be returned to Romania.

Over the following months, the rise of the fascist Iron Guard and the problematic elections of December 1937 upset the liberal order in Romania. In the run-up to the elections, Comnen had sought to mitigate Germany's open support for the Iron Guard, offering its government a chance to apologize for Ambassador Fabricius' presence at the funerals of Ion Moța and Vasile Marin. This request was angrily rejected in Berlin, mainly because the ambassador "had only attended a religious ceremony". Eventually, Carol pleased Germany by handing government to Octavian Goga and his Nazi-oriented National Christian Party (PNC). Comnen confirmed to this standard, communicating in Berlin the guidelines of Romania's neutralist policy: preservation of Franco– and British–Romanian relations, full economic cooperation with Germany, and "no hostile attitude toward Russia."

Comnen went on to serve as undersecretary of the Foreign Affairs Ministry, which was led by Gheorghe Tătărescu. His advancement was supposed to placate Germany, which had been unpleasantly surprised by the PNC's downfall; it was also greeted by the Italian ambassador, Ugo Sola. He was described in the Journal des Débats as primarily a Francophile, but continued to be seen by the Auswärtiges Amt as a friend of Germany in the cabinet, on par with Alexandru Averescu and Constantin Argetoianu. Upon his recall to Bucharest, Hitler showed his appreciation for the diplomat in a special letter to Carol II—this was a first in Romanian annals. Soon after taking office, Comnen, who was more probably a neutralist, presided upon the council of the Balkan Pact, and, in February 1938, drafted its Ankara resolution, condemning "any interference in the internal politics" of member states.

=== Ministerial term ===
==== Anschluss and Munich Crisis ====
During the early days of 1938, Comnen announced that he was no longer involved with the National Liberal Party, taking his distance from Tătărescu. Widely tipped to become the full minister, he took over on March 30, days after the Anschluss crisis. His term coincided with the major developments in Carol's feud with the Iron Guard; Prime Minister Miron Cristea served Carol's own authoritarian regime, which consolidated a single-party National Renaissance Front. One of Comnen's first actions was to inform the British Foreign Office and the French Foreign Ministry about Germany's economic tactics; he also advised Germany not to act against Czechoslovakia, or risk a "world war". In May, he informed German diplomats that Romanian prosecutors had obtained concrete evidence that had been sponsoring the Iron Guard. He assured Fabricius that the information would not be publicized, on condition that "this thing is brought to an end."

Comnen also emphasized the importance of Franco–British–Romanian relations by elevating the ranks of his ambassadors in both countries, and by making Tătărescu his Paris envoy. However, Romania was facing international criticism over her disbanding of the Danube Commission and her introduction of antisemitic laws. Her relations with Britain were also strained by the appointment of Lord Halifax, a proponent of appeasement and thus a "great friend of Hitlerian Germany", as Foreign Secretary. The situation was complicated by a sudden worsening of relations with the Soviet Union, when the Soviet diplomat Fedor Butenko disappeared in Bucharest. Before the details of this escape emerged, the Soviet side was claiming that Butenko had been abducted or killed by a PNC militia, the Lăncieri. There was a sudden worsening of Romanian–Soviet relations, almost to the brink of war. Eventually, the investigating team informed Comnen of the actual facts, namely that Butenko had defected of his own free will, to escape a likely execution in the Great Purge; this was later confirmed in a letter which Butenko addressed to the Romanian Foreign Ministry from his new home in Italy. Despite being targeted by Soviet officials, who alleged that he had a role in this affair, he did not speak publicly in support of Butenko.

Petrescu-Comnen was subject to increasing pressures from the Germans to reorient his country's foreign policy towards the Tripartite Pact. Rosenberg called on Petrescu-Comnen to abandon Little Entente commitments to Czechoslovakia, as a prerequisite for good economic exchanges with Germany. The Romanian minister sought to counter such pressures by negotiating an economic treaty with Britain, which was still being discussed, then shelved, in August 1938. The relations were tested by the question of Romanian Jewish disenfranchisement, with Comnen refusing to accept British suggestions that the policy be reversed. Progressively, Romania was coming to terms with her economic dependency on Germany, with Comnen issuing statements that hinted to a change of priorities in foreign affairs. Romania was therefore quick in recognizing the Anschluss as "unavoidable" and "unobjectionable". His ministry still attempted to prioritize Romania's commitment to Czechoslovakia (tested by both Nazi and Polish demands, as well as by Czechoslovakia's friendship towards the Soviet state); it eventually witnessed the Munich Agreement, and, despite official protests, had to seek a new course in European politics.

Petrescu-Comnen was reserved about the Soviets' intervention on Czechoslovakia's side; he insisted that Romanian cooperation with the Red Army would only come with a recognition of Bessarabia as Romanian territory. More specifically, Comnen and the rest of his government expected France to provide Romania with guarantees. Contacted by Maxim Litvinov and Kamil Krofta in September, he promised that he would obtain flyover rights for the Soviet Air Forces, but these were never approved by his government. In conversation with Georges Bonnet, he confessed his own fears, namely that Litvinov was preparing the invasion of Bessarabia; he also commented at length on Romania's unpreparedness for war. According to Comnen, Soviet aircraft could cross into Romania's airspace at will, if the Soviets so desired, since it could not ever be hit by Romanian flak guns; he also insisted that a Red Army presence in Romania would have been of no service to Czechoslovakia, since roads linking Bessarabia to Carpathian Ruthenia were few and poorly maintained.

By then, Romania's airspace was intensely used by Soviet aircraft. When pressed about this issue by Göring, as Germany's Air Minister, Comnen insisted that the planes could not be downed. In effect, with his revelations about the flak range, Comnen gave the Soviets a free pass—as noted by French diplomatic cables, he did not want terrestrial passage, but "close[d] his eyes to overflights of [Romania's] territory." Air defense, Comnen promised, "would take a few badly aimed potshots at Soviet planes, and that would be that." More officially, in September he also allowed the Czechoslovak Air Force to fly its newly purchased warplanes from Soviet bases, over Romania. Beneš and Heliodor Píka later testified that Comnen had respected his promises to Czechoslovakia. As argued by journalist Alexander Bregman and historian Anna M. Cienciala, this exposes as false the claims publicized by Soviet historiography, according to which Romania sabotaged the Czechoslovak–Soviet entente. The Soviets, they note, limited their involvement because they were unprepared for war with Germany. Nevertheless, as argued by historians such as Rebecca Haynes, Comnen himself never prepared for a Romanian military intervention in support of Czechoslovakia, except against an invasion by or from Hungary.

==== Crumbling alliances ====
The issue of Carpathian Ruthenia (or Carpatho-Ukraine) in 1938: post-Munich Czechoslovakia and the other countries of the Little Entente in blue, with Carpatho-Ukraine shaded; in red, Hungary and her supporter, Poland. The region's annexation would have cut off Czechoslovakia's links with all her allies

In May, at the height of the Munich crisis, Petrescu-Comnen informed Fabricius that "nothing of what endangers the existence of Czechoslovakia will leave us unmoved"; he himself was surfacing as a spokesman for the Little Entente as a whole. He represented it at the League of Nations, where he recognized the Italian annexation of Ethiopia as irreversible. He "took the initiative in liquidating the Ethiopian question", then followed the Anglo–French attempt to restore relations with Italy: "the Italian conquest would have to be acknowledged, unless [League members] were prepared to live forever in an unreal world." Faced with the German attempts to seize control over the Danube, Comnen and other Romanian experts sought to re-legitimize the Danube Commission; in exchange, he obtained French and British recognition of Romania's full sovereignty over the Danube Delta.

Comnen hosted the Little Entente leaders at a summit in Sinaia, and agreed to negotiate a collective nonaggression pact with Hungary; he also empowered Ioannis Metaxas to approach Bulgaria for similar talks. He managed to sign accords to that effect (the Bled and Salonika agreements), despite German pressures on Yugoslavia. Although celebrated in France as a major achievement for peace and stability, these arrangements were in fact "very banal", and Bled presented no guarantees for Czechoslovakia's survival. They were also notable for lifting the ban on Hungarian re-armament, which he advertised as a prelude to reaching "good terms with Hungary." However, Comnen delayed the application of that clause to October, which reportedly caused Hungary's Foreign Minister, Kálmán Kánya, to lose his temper on at least one occasion.

Comnen was highly critical of Poland's participation in the German occupation of Czechoslovakia, which upset his plans for resistance. Returning to Geneva as the Little Entente was falling apart, he managed to persuade Yugoslavia's Milan Stojadinović not to give up on the project. On September 23, they addressed Hungary an ultimatum, threatening war if she would invade Czechoslovakia; Stojadinović rescinded five days later. Comnen continued to press for Yugoslavia to maintain the Little Entente, while also urging Jan Syrový's government to reconcile with the Ruthenian autonomists and the Slovak People's Party. The same month, he also approached Litvinov, promising that Romania would play no part in "anti-Soviet actions", also renouncing the demand for territorial guarantees, and even proposing that the Red Army be allowed to cross into Carpathian Ruthenia by way of Cernăuți County.

The Polish–Romanian alliance was also threatened by warm Hungary–Poland relations. Among the Polish diplomats, Count Leo Orlowski theorized that Romania should join the alliance with Hungary, "a country of the future", and abandon Czechoslovakia. At an October conference in Galați, Comnen tried to persuade Józef Beck, the Polish Foreign Minister, not to accept a Hungarian takeover in Ruthenia. He then refused Polish offers for Romania to annex parts of that region, in Northern Maramureș. Confronted with Romania's argument that either Czechoslovak rule or an independent Carpatho-Ukraine were preferable to Hungarian irredentism, Beck became convinced that Comnen was a "perfect imbecile", describing him as such in his memoirs. Comnen obtained from him a promise that Poland would intervene to reduce Hungary's territorial demands, but Beck never acted on that pledge. For his part, Comnen continued to aggravate the Poles by stating his support for an independent Ukraine, which he argued would be a natural ally of Poland and Romania against both Germany and the Soviet Union.

On September 12, Petrescu-Comnen had written Bonnet to demand that France honor its promise of properly arming the Romanian military, noting: "it would be a grave error if France were to lose our army's sympathy." Believing that France and Britain were not going to defend Romania, he ultimately took Romania closer to Germany and the Axis powers. In parallel to his purely political work, Petrescu-Comnen worked with George Oprescu and Marie of Romania, organizing the exhibit of German old master prints. From October 1938, he tried to persuade Germany not to dismantle reduced Czechoslovakia, and especially not to allow Hungary to annex Ruthenia. Despite assurances that Germany would only let Hungary take Hungarian areas, the First Vienna Award produced a Hungarian Governorate of Subcarpathia, which isolated Romania's territory. This then opened the way for Hungarian demands in Transylvania. In November, Comnen suggested settling the Transylvanian issue through a population exchange with Hungary, noting that Romania's Hungarians were mostly town-dwellers. This proposal was rejected by demographer Béla Kenéz on the Hungarian side—he noted that it would have implied removing almost 2 million people to make room for the 16,000 Romanians in Hungary.

Comnen also spearheaded a project to encourage a mass emigration of Romanian Jews, a draft of which was presented by Wilhelm Filderman and accepted on behalf of government by Mihai Ralea. In November, he organized Carol's state visit to Britain. In his own interview with Halifax, Comnen openly criticized France and Britain for abandoning Czechoslovakia; in that context, he also claimed that he himself had rejected an offer by "Slovak political parties" to obtain a League of Nations mandate over that region. Carol's diplomatic tour was also an attempt to quell international protests regarding Goga's treatment of the Jews. In the aftermath, Carol recalled his minister in London, Vasile Grigorcea, who had angered the monarch with his unrealistic reports; now a Grand Cross of the Order of St Michael and St George, Comnen also found himself at odds with Carol's courtier, Ernest Urdăreanu, who flaunted diplomatic conventions by asking to receive a higher honor.

=== Downfall ===
The change of policy toward Germany incensed the underground democratic opposition, and especially Maniu's National Peasants' Party. It accused Carol of appeasement and called for a national unity cabinet to deal with the crisis. In that context, Comnen had a publicized meeting with three former Ministers of Foreign Affairs (Dimitrie I. Ghika, Victor Antonescu, Istrate Micescu), showing that they backed his German rapprochement. The effort proved largely futile: as Comnen himself noted, Hitler resented Carol for repressing the Iron Guard and murdering its leader, Corneliu Zelea Codreanu; reportedly, this implicit criticism of the regime brought his demotion, by Carol, on December 20. However, Yugoslav diplomat Kosta St. Pavlowitch recalls that Carol had the idea to replace Comnen with Grigore Gafencu, a journalist for Timpul, when the three of them were in London; while there, Gafencu won the king's confidence. Another diplomat, Alexandru Iacovachi, also argues that Comnen had failed Carol's expectations during the London visit—specifically, that a commercial treaty would be signed, and that the Royal Navy would send a squadron to Constanța.

Petrescu-Comnen's proposed "Pact of Neutral Countries" (in gold)—Balkan Pact members, joined by Bulgaria and protected by Italy. In black, the Axis powers; Allies in blue and Soviet Union in red (1939 borders)

Before Gafencu took over, Comnen was informed that he would return as Romania's representative to the Holy See. According to Pavlowitch, he had overall proven himself "a conscious bureaucrat and an astute diplomat, [...] but, as was reported, did not rise to the challenge of the events. [...] During the deepest of Europe's crises, [...] Romanian foreign politics had been entrusted to someone who had no means of influencing the events, and who looked on passively as the ground was slipping away from under his feet". Petrescu-Comnen took up his new office in Rome on January 20, 1939, visiting Pacelli, now Pope Pius XII, at the Palace of Castel Gandolfo to present him with works of Romanian ethnography and assess his views on international politics.

From his posting, Petrescu-Comnen witnessed the revelations of a German–Soviet Pact, which, as he reported to Gafencu, placed Romania in imminent danger. He remained in Rome after the outbreak of World War II a week later. The German invasion of Poland convinced Comnen that there was "no reasoning to be tried with the Germans"—a pessimistic note which contrasted Gafencu's attempts to reach a new understanding with the Axis. According to his own recollections, he was entrusted by Gafencu and Şükrü Saracoğlu with obtaining Italian backing for the Balkan Pact, which was to include a pacified Bulgaria; at the time, Italy was still "non-belligerent". Although Mussolini eventually backed Hitler, Comen still hoped to obtain Italian and papal support for Romania before and during the Second Vienna Award. By April 1940, he was allegedly contacted by Myron Charles Taylor, and through him informed US foreign policy.

Hungary's annexation of Northern Transylvania, preceded by the Soviet occupation of Bessarabia, signaled a regime change in Romania. In September 1940, King Carol was ousted and an Axis-aligned Iron Guard government took over in Bucharest; Petrescu-Comnen, identified as a pillar of the old system, was sacked within days. His office was unofficially taken over by Guardist Ioan Victor Vojen, who, upon his arrival, prevented Comnen from attending any official function; the aging diplomat withdrew to Fiesole, on a vineyard which had once belonged to Niccolò Machiavelli. Effectively, Petrescu-Comnen's mission ended on November 15, 1940. Following the civil war of January 1941, which Comnen described as Romania's "black days", the Guardist regime was replaced, and Ion Antonescu governed alone. From his new home in Merano, Comnen petitioned the ministry, insisting that he could still prove useful in his dealings with the Holy See, and through it prevent the Magyarization of Northern Transylvania. He found a backer in the government secretary, Alexandru Cretzianu, but was denied full reemployment. He was ultimately pensioned on May 1, 1941.

=== In Florence ===
Like many other diplomats who favored the Allies, Comnen decided not to return home as Antonescu sealed Romania's alliance with the Axis. Instead, he was co-opted by Viorel Tilea on London's Romanian National Committee (RNC)—alongside Gafencu, Dimitrie Dimăncescu, and Ioan Pangal. Settled in Florence, he led an International Red Cross Committee, and founded an exile section of the Romanian Red Cross. In 1943, after the Allied invasion of Italy, he mediated between the two sides to preserve the city's art and architecture from destruction, and in return was awarded the title of honorary citizen of Florence. According to historian Ioana Ursu, Comnen should be credited with having rescued the Ponte Vecchio from being detonated by the retreating Germans. Also in 1943, Comnen published in Geneva the book Anarchie, dictature ou l'organisation internationale ("Anarchy, Dictatorship or International Organization").

Choosing to remain in exile to Italy after the Soviet occupation of Romania, Petrescu-Comnen spoke out against communization and lectured in particular against the Danubian Confederation project; nevertheless, he intervened to mitigate the effects of drought and famine in his native country. By 1947, he was also collecting and publishing in Florence his records of the war, and of his own part in it, as Preludi del grande dramma ("Preludes of the Great Tragedy"), followed in 1949 by the more detailed I Responsabili ("The Culprits"), at Mondadori. In exile, he resumed contacts with Carol, who stated his appreciation for the diplomat and described Preludi as the best analysis of Romania's plight in the late interwar. The books were also reviewed by the historian Carlile Aylmer Macartney, who also found Preludi to be the better work: in I Responsabili, he argued, the "butter is spread more thinly", including "a general account of European developments in which M. Comnène had himself no hand, and for which he uses sources which are generally available". According to Macartney, the books show Comnen as "well informed, intelligent, and right-minded", his "sketches of various personalities" displaying "elegance and esprit."

Comnen's hope of returning to Romania was curbed by the establishment of a Communist regime. He joined Gafencu in cooperating with the European Movement International (also advancing a European federation in his various articles and books), while also maintaining links with the RNC, now an anti-communist organization, building bridges between the latter and the Holy See. Until 1950, he received funding from the exile industrialist Nicolae Malaxa, which he used to sponsor expatriate Romanian academics and "some 40 students in France". Also in 1950, Comnen intervened as a mediator Gafencu and the RNC leader, Nicolae Rădescu. The following year, Constantin Vișoianu nominated him as RNC representative to the Vatican, although he was eventually assigned, that same year, to represent the RNC in the Italian republic.

Comnen was also taking trips to Brazil, initially as a delegate of Florence city council. In September 1954, he was at Rio de Janeiro, lecturing at the Romanian House on issues of international diplomacy. He resumed his publishing in 1957, with the memoirs of his 1919 trip to Hungary (published by a Romanian group in Madrid) and the historical review Luci e ombre sull'Europa ("Lights and Shadows over Europe"). By then, his Bucharest townhouse, located within walking distance of Victory Square, had been confiscated by the communist regime together with his objets d'art and his antique book collection. His family was also exposed to persecution: nephew Dan Cernovodeanu was sent to a labor camp on the Danube–Black Sea Canal; while there, he conspired with fellow inmate Ion Mitucă. In 1955, the latter, who was planning an anti-communist insurgency, tried to defect and contact Comnen.

The former minister died in his adoptive Florence, without completing work on his final volume, a diplomatic history of Romania. In addition to receiving the Olympic Cross and the Order of Saint George knighthood, he had been a Grand Cross of the Order of the Star of Romania, a Grand Cross of the Order For Merit, an Officer of the Order of the Crown, a Commander of the Order of the Cross of Marie; a Grand Cross of the Pour le Mérite, the German Eagle, the Saxe-Ernestine House Order, the Order of George I, the Order of the Crown of Italy, and the Order of the Yugoslav Crown; as well as Commander of the Order of the Redeemer and the Polonia Restituta, an Officer of the Oak Crown, a Knight of the Ordre des Palmes Académiques and the House Order of Hohenzollern, and a recipient of Benemerenti medal.

== Legacy ==
Comnen was survived by daughter Elsa-Irène, whom Pius XII converted to Catholicism, and who lived for a while as a nun. She later married and took the name Irene Bie. Settling in Maryhill, Washington, she donated her collection of Romanian paintings to the local art gallery, named after her father. The diplomat's daughter-in-law Angela Comnène published in 1982 an English biography of Comnen, and did research into his genealogy.

Communist censorship meant that Comnen's contribution was unmentioned in Romania until the 1970s, when his work was briefly covered, with some excerpts, detailing his anti-Nazism, appearing in Magazin Istoric in the early 1980s; his memory was primarily maintained by his peers in Italy. Following the Romanian Revolution of 1989, he was again the subject of public scrutiny: his Notes sur la guerre roumaine was translated and published by Polirom in 1995; and his decorations, donated to the Ministry of Foreign Affairs by Angela Comnène, went on public display in 1998. In 2003, his documents relating to the Holy See were published as part of an Editura Enciclopedică series, with a preface by Jean-Claude Périsset. The Comnen house, heavily damaged during the 1977 Vrancea earthquake, was inscribed into the National Register of Historic Monuments in Romania. However, by 2011 it had fallen into disrepair and was threatened with demolition.
