= Croatian–Romanian–Slovak friendship proclamation =

1942 document

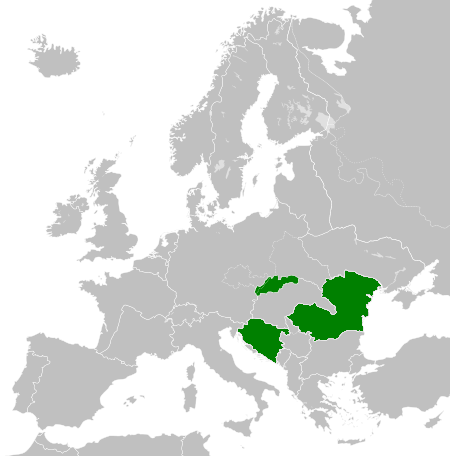
Romania, Croatia and Slovakia in 1942

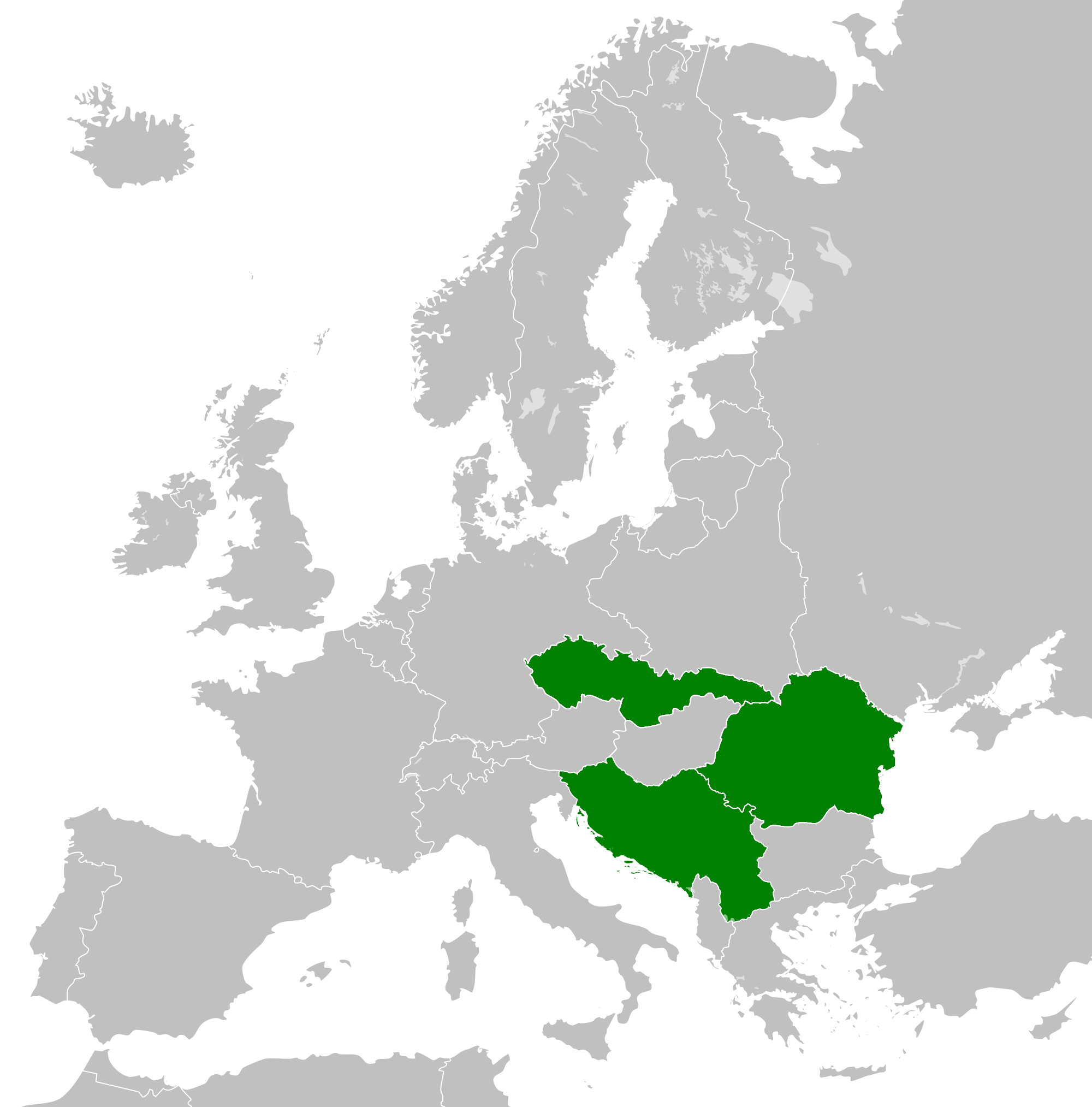
The Little Entente (1921–1938)

During World War II, a joint friendship proclamation was created between the Kingdom of Romania, the Independent State of Croatia and the Slovak Republic against any further Hungarian expansion. Marshal Ion Antonescu, the Prime Minister of Romania, engaged in some intra-Axis diplomacy and created the alliance in May 1942. The union was similar to the interwar Little Entente.

Later in the war, Slovak troops and Croatian naval and air units operated together from Romanian soil. Tensions with Hungary resulted in a Hungarian cross-border raid at Turda, near Cluj. This would be one of ten clashes to happen during the month.

On 1 August 1942, Antonescu publicly backed down on claims to Northern Transylvania for the duration of the war. He did so under pressure from Hitler, who did not want Hungary and Romania to enter conflict while war in the east was ongoing and wanted him and Miklós Horthy, the Regent of Hungary, to publicly commit to the Second Vienna Award once more. However he maintained ambitions on Northern Transylvania in private.

== Gallery ==
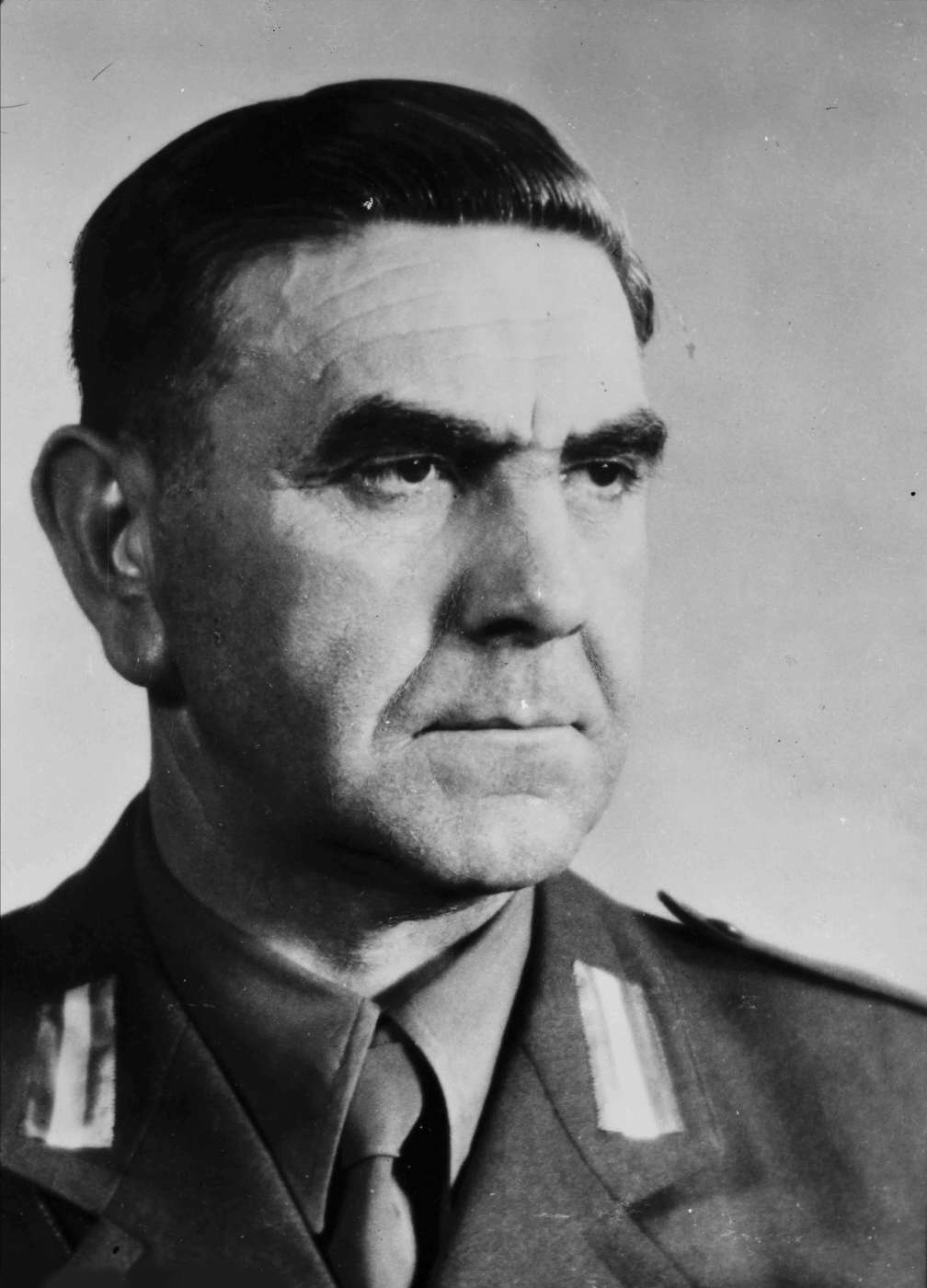
Ante Pavelić, Poglavnik of Croatia

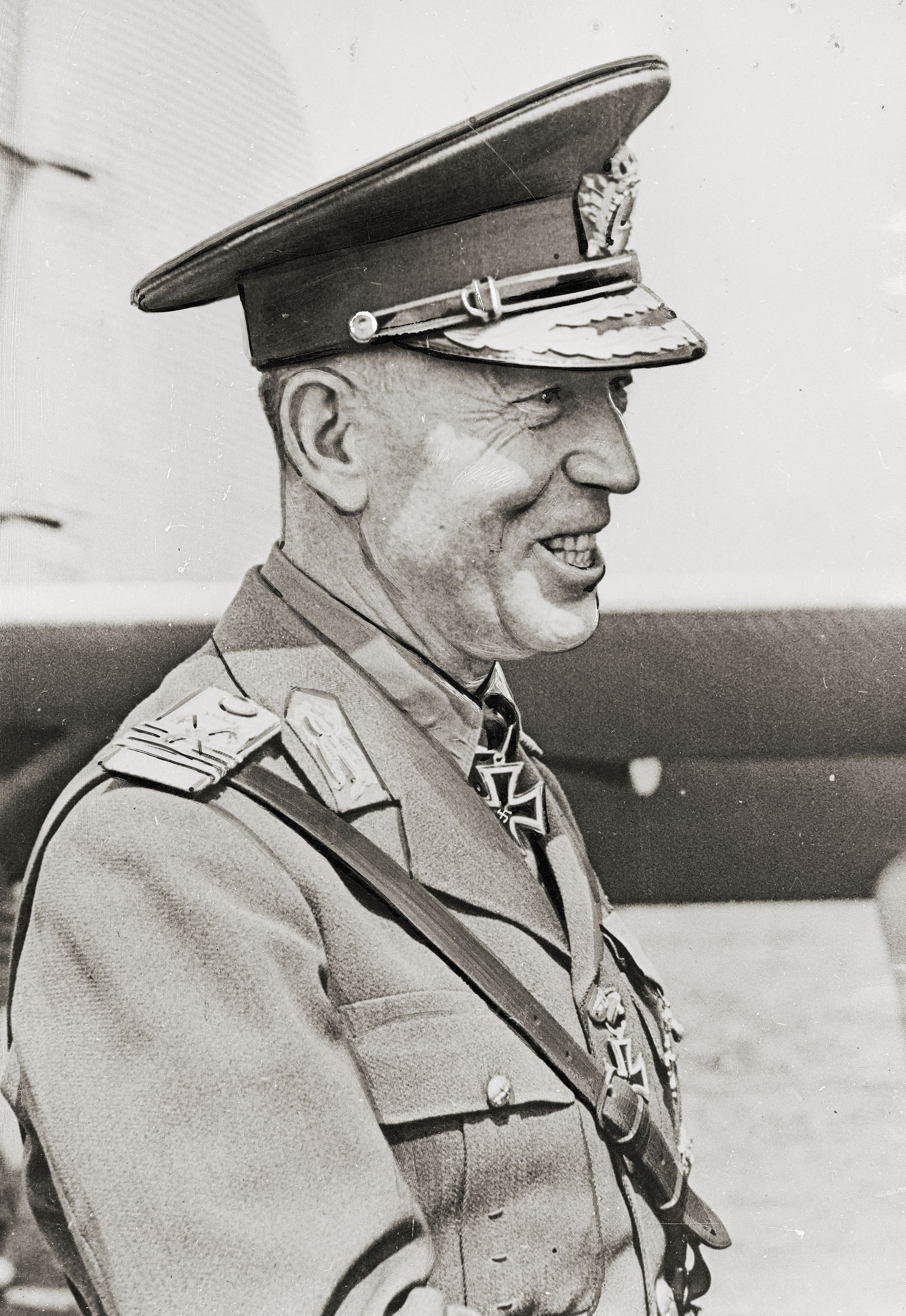
Ion Antonescu, Conducător of Romania

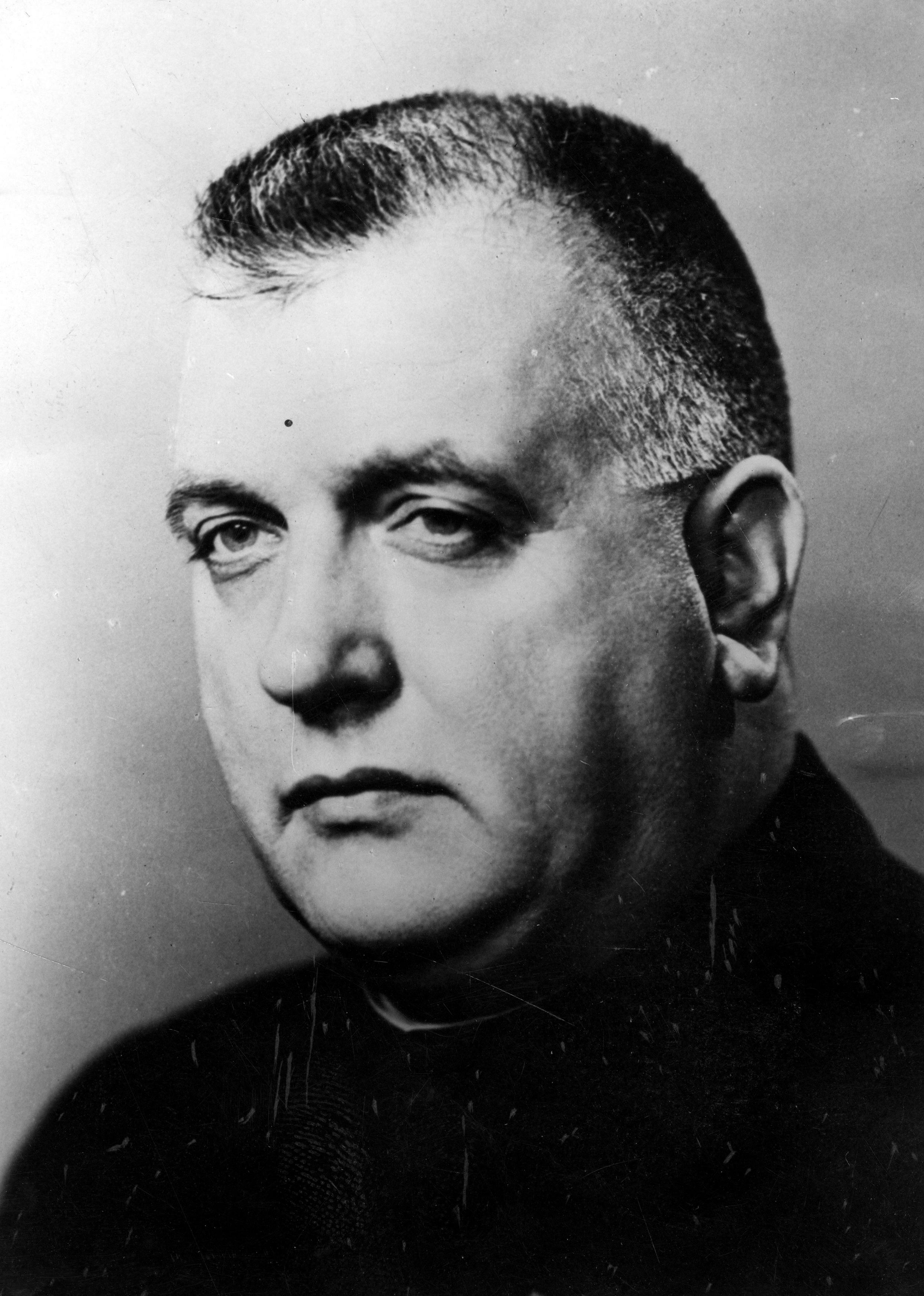
Jozef Tiso, President of Slovakia

== See also ==
- Latin Axis (World War II)
- Little Entente
- Balkan Pact
- Polish–Romanian alliance
- Balkan Pact (1953)
