= Rearmament =

Rearmament may refer to:

- German rearmament (Aufrüstung), the growth of the German military in contravention of the Versailles treaty (1930s)
- British rearmament, the modernisation of the British military in response to German rearmament (1930s)
- Salonika Agreement (31 July 1938), a treaty permitting Bulgaria to rearm contrary to the Treaty of Neuilly
- Bled agreement (1938), a treaty permitting Hungary to rearm contrary to the Treaty of Trianon
- West German rearmament, the American plan to help rebuild the military in West Germany after World War II in response to the Cold War
- 2020s European rearmament, in response to Russia's invasion of Ukraine and US policy shifts
- Readiness 2030 (formerly ReArm Europe), EC plan to increase military spending to up to 800 billion euros
- Moral Re-Armament (MRA), an international religious movement that arose in 1938
- Rearmament (album), by American singer/songwriter Happy Rhodes
