= Polish–Romanian alliance =

1921–1939 alliance between Poland and Romania

The Polish–Romanian alliance (Polish: Sojusz polsko-rumuński) (Romanian: Alianța polono-română) was a series of treaties signed in the interwar period by the Second Polish Republic and the Kingdom of Romania. The first of them was signed in 1921 and, together, the treaties formed a basis for good foreign relations between the two countries that lasted until World War II began in 1939.

== European context ==
Immediately after World War I, the peace treaties recognized the reestablishment of a Polish state for the first time in over 100 years. Romania emerged from the war as a victorious nation, enlarging its territory (as Greater Romania). Both states had serious reasons to stand by these treaties.

Having established contacts with Poland in January–February 1919 (after Stanisław Głąbiński's visit to Bucharest), Romania oriented itself towards a cordon sanitaire alliance aimed at Bolshevist Russia and the newly created Comintern; the proclamation of the Hungarian Soviet Republic, the German insurrection, and the Red Army's capture of Odessa alarmed politicians in both countries. The diplomat Czesław Pruszyński reported to the Polish government:

"A dam that can put a stop to Bolshevik pressure on the West is constituted of Poland to the north, and Romania to the south. [...] There is a natural necessity, but also a historical necessity, that, based on the mutual interests of Romania and Poland, a military alliance be sealed in front of the common threat facing them."

Romania was not engaged in the Polish-Soviet War, but accepted and supported Polish military transit through its territory. According to another of Pruszyński's reports, Romania facilitated the transit of Polish nationals from Russia to their native areas, as well as furnishing armament and grain at preferential prices. In this context, the Romanian Army intervened in the Polish-Ukrainian War against the West Ukrainian People's Republic (created in Galicia in the summer of that year), helping the Poles in Pokuttya (see Romanian occupation of Pokuttya).

Count Aleksander Skrzyński, acting with the acknowledgement of Polish leaders Ignacy Jan Paderewski and Józef Piłsudski, extended an offer to the Romanian government of Ion I. C. Brătianu to participate in the future administration of Ukraine in its entirety (August 1919); the message was again stated after Skrzyński became ambassador in Romania the following month. Alexandru G. Florescu, the ambassador to Warsaw, reported back that the plan for a common military administration was:

"[...] an inaccuracy and a fantasy which I suppose one should not take into account for anything other than making stock of them."

Agreeing with Florescu's assessment, the Brătianu cabinet expressed a will to establish contacts with the Ukrainian People's Republic. In 1920, a similar plan was proposed by Piłsudski himself to the Alexandru Averescu government; the offer was more specific, indicating that Romania was to extend its administration to the east (the Black Sea shore, Odessa, and Transnistria). Averescu refused to accept the proposal, as it meant his country's involvement in the Russian Civil War.

== The first treaty ==
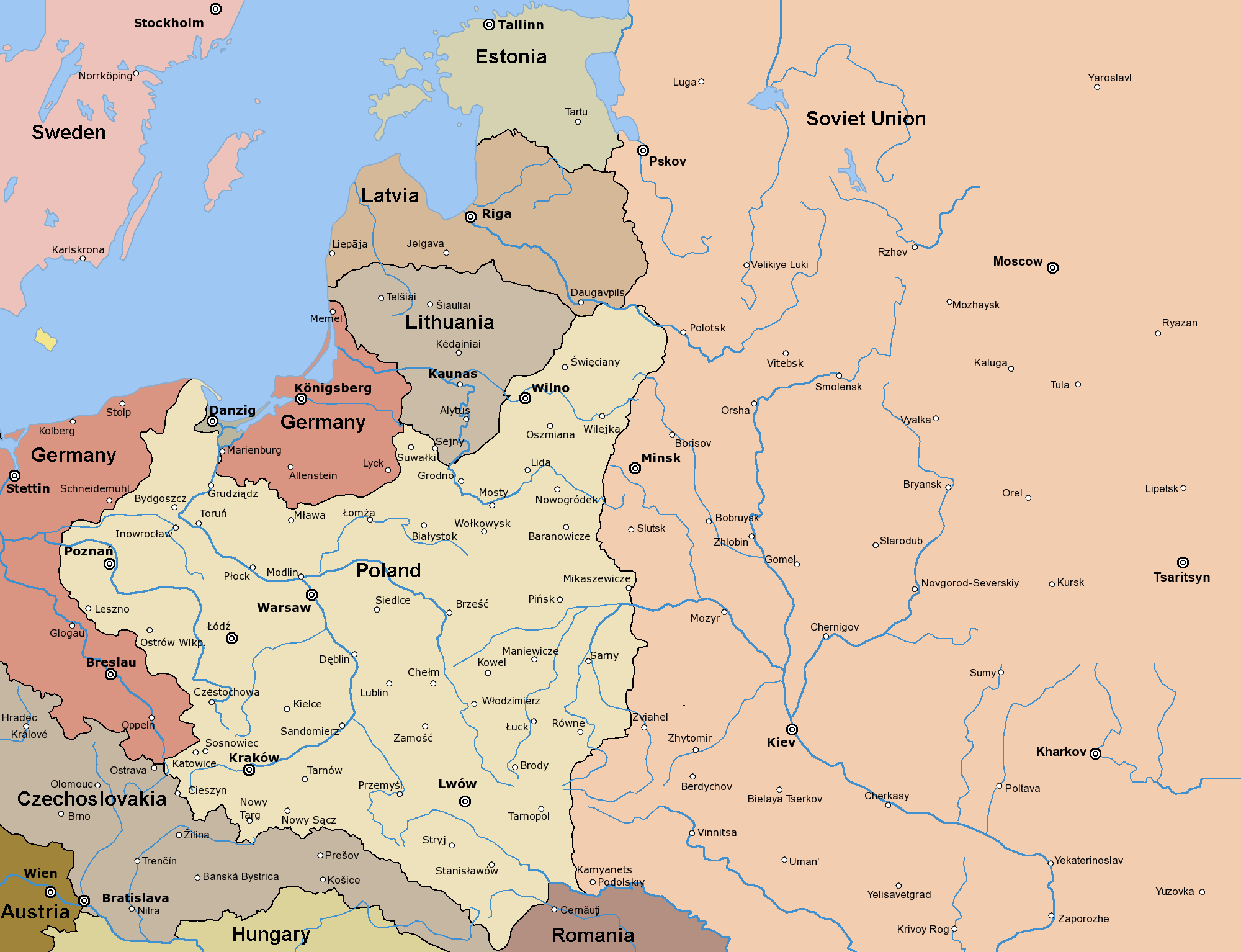
Poland in 1922; northern areas of Romania visible to the south

The first treaty was the Convention on Defensive Alliance, signed on March 3, 1921, in Bucharest. The treaty, concluded for a period of five years, committed both parties to rendering armed assistance to one another "in case one of the sides is attacked at its present Eastern frontiers". and was aimed at containing Russia (from 1922, the Soviet Union), which had just lost the Polish-Soviet War. Among the diplomats engaged in negotiations were Polish general Tadeusz Rozwadowski and Romanian general Ion Antonescu. Ratifications for that treaty were exchanged in Bucharest on July 25, 1921. The treaty was registered in League of Nations Treaty Series on October 24 of the same year.

In the early 1920s, Romania, along with Czechoslovakia and Yugoslavia, initiated the Little Entente. The alliance's primary goal was to counter Hungary's revanchism, which involved Romania's Transylvania. Romania's Foreign Minister, Take Ionescu, was unable to bring Poland and Greece into the alliance because of border disagreements between Poland and Czechoslovakia. The Romanian representative in Warsaw reported:

"Poland's policy towards the Little Entente [...] becomes clearer. Poland will not wish to join it. [...] This attitude may be related to Mr. Beneš's, who seems to have declared that Poland's joining the treaty is not currently possible."

However, in 1925, the Locarno Treaties were signed in which Germany committed to preserve the status quo in the Rhineland. Germany also signed arbitration conventions with Poland and Czechoslovakia, but the Polish government felt betrayed by France.

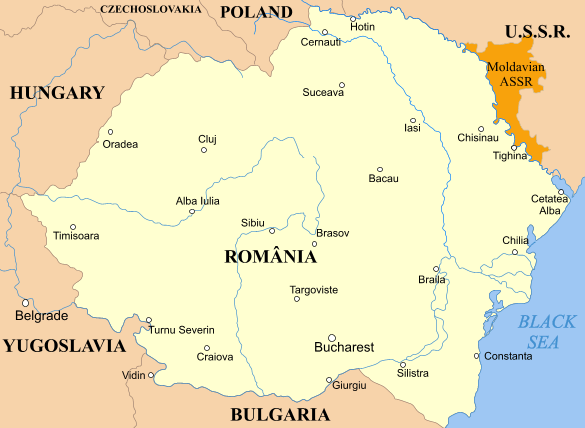
Greater Romania (1920–1940)

Under the circumstances, the Polish-Romanian treaty's renewal was discussed in the early months of 1926. The Romanian foreign minister, Ion G. Duca, wrote in a telegram to the Romanian ambassador in France:

"Our treaty with Poland expires on the 3rd of March. The Poles will not renew it in the present form, as they have to take into account the atmosphere created by the League of Nations and the Locarno Treaties. They also do not want to keep an exclusively anti-Russian treaty [...] Poland wishes to obtain our help in case it were attacked by Germany."

== Further treaties ==
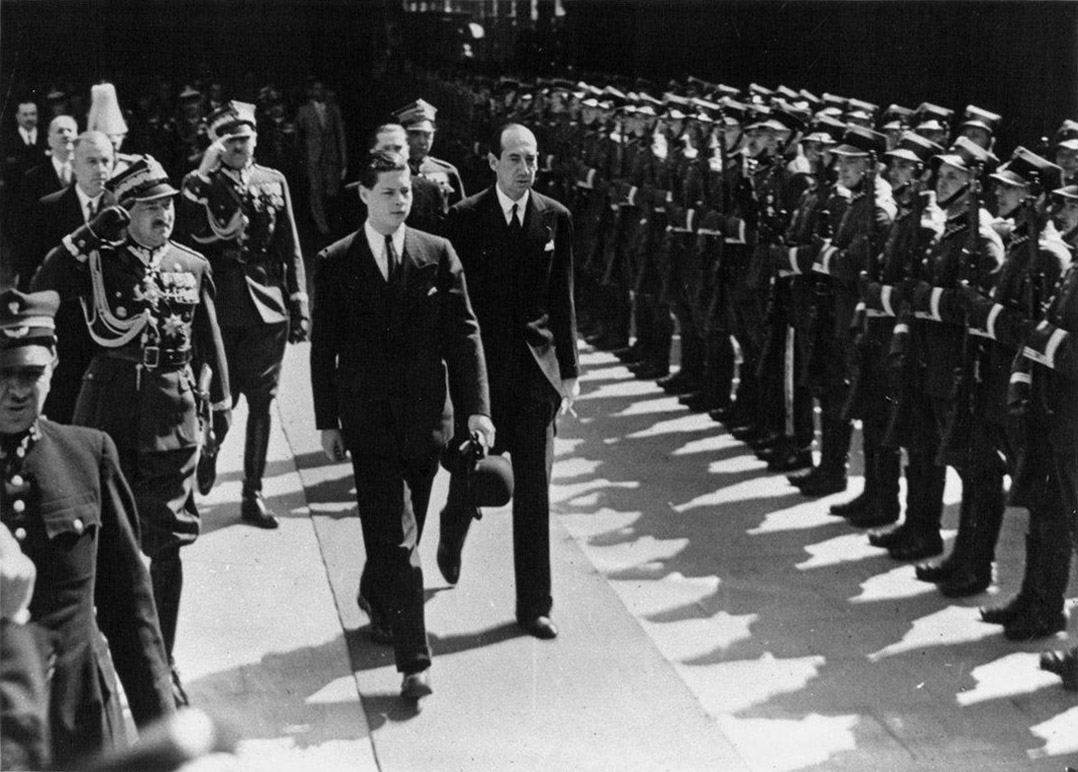
Crown Prince Michael of Romania with Polish Foreign Minister Józef Beck in Warsaw, 24 May 1937.

On March 26, 1926, Poland and Romania signed a Treaty of Alliance to bolster security in Eastern Europe. It was directed against any attack, not just one coming from the Soviet Union. Ratifications were exchanged in Warsaw on February 9, 1927. The treaty was registered in the League of Nations Treaty Series on March 7, 1927.

The convention was replaced by the Treaty on Mutual Assistance against Aggression and on Military Aid, signed on February 9, 1927, in Warsaw.

In both countries, political changes were taking place. The King of Romania, Ferdinand I died in 1927, leaving the throne to his young grandson, Mihai I. A regency took over the administration of the monarchic institution until the 1930 takeover of Carol II.

Relations became colder as their interests diverged. Romania created the Balkan Pact in 1934, together with Yugoslavia, Turkey and Greece.

Under the premiership of Gheorghe Tătărescu (1934–1937), Romania's attempt to balance its alliances with Poland and Czechoslovakia was put to the test by a political scandal. Jan Šeba, the Czechoslovak ambassador to Bucharest, published a volume that supported a rapprochement between the Soviet Union and the Little Entente and was prefaced by the Czechoslovak Foreign Minister Kamil Krofta. In early 1937, Krofta denied knowledge of the book's content and, after Tătărescu visited Milan Hodža, his counterpart in Prague, Šeba was recalled. Later that year, Tătărescu met with Polish Foreign Minister Józef Beck in Bucharest. Beck, who had previously opposed the status quo policies of Nicolae Titulescu, unsuccessfully proposed a Romanian withdrawal of its support for Czechoslovakia and an attempt to reach a compromise with Hungary.

In 1938, in the wake of the Czechoslovak crisis, Beck urged the Romanian government of Miron Cristea, formed by the National Renaissance Front, to participate at the partition of Czechoslovakia (the Munich Agreement), by supporting Hungary's annexation of Carpathian Ruthenia. He hoped that Hungary's Miklós Horthy would no longer sustain claims over Transylvania. However, the offer was refused by Carol II.

As the situation was becoming increasingly volatile in the eve of World War II, the two countries began improving their relations. In 1938, Richard Franasovici, the Romanian ambassador in Warsaw, reported:

"[There is] an obvious improvement of Poland's sentiments towards Romania [...]. The main idea here is maintaining, above everything, the alliance with Romania, of course, due to the growing pressure from Germany, as well as due to the desire to not be completely isolated in the Ukrainian problem [...] Also, [the Poles] consider that the German influence in Budapest and Prague is too powerful [...]."

Both countries soon offered each other assistance. After the partition of Czechoslovakia, Romania feared being next. Ambassador Franasovici reported in March 1939 that:

"[...] as with their appeasing intervention in Budapest, the Polish government pointed out that any action of Hungary against Romania could lead to a new world war, and guaranteed Romania's peaceful intentions."

The annulment of Polish-Romanian treaties was one of the Soviet demands during prewar French, British, Polish and Soviet negotiations.

Polish diplomacy also secured British guarantees to Romania in the Polish-British Common Defense Pact of 1939. Diplomats and strategists in Poland viewed the alliance with Romania as an important part of Polish foreign and defense policy, but it eventually proved to be mostly irrelevant. Immediately preceding the war, Poland and Romania avoided specifically aiming their agreements against Germany, a country with which both were still seeking a compromise, as Beck and Grigore Gafencu agreed in the April 1939 negotiations in Kraków.

== Outbreak of World War II ==
After the German invasion of Poland on September 1, Poland declined Romanian military assistance but expected to receive assistance from its British and French allies through Romanian ports; thus the reason for the Romanian Bridgehead plan.

After the Red Army joined the German attack on September 17, 1939, with Western assistance not forthcoming, the Polish high command abandoned the plan and ordered its units to evacuate to France. Many units went through Romanian borders, where they were interned, but Romania remained friendly towards Poles, allowing many soldiers to escape from the camps and to move to France. Romania also treated interned Polish soldiers and immigrants with relative respect throughout the war even after it joined the Axis in 1941. However, as a result of German pressure, Romania could not openly aid the Poles.

On September 21, 1939, the pro-British prime minister of Romania, Armand Călinescu, was killed in Bucharest by a squad of local fascist activists of the Iron Guard, with German support. Immediately afterwards, German authorities issued propaganda blaming the action on Polish and British initiative. Notably, the Nazi journalist Hans Fritzsche attributed the assassination to Polish and British resentments over Romania's failure to intervene in the war.

== Diplomatic alternatives ==
Though some politicians, such as Poland's Józef Piłsudski, who had proposed the Międzymorze federation at the end of World War I had attempted to forge a grand coalition of Central, Eastern and Balkan European states, a series of conflicts there had prevented the establishment of anything but a series of smaller, mostly bilateral, treaties.

Poland, for example, had good relations with Latvia, Romania, Hungary and France (with the Franco-Polish Military Alliance) but poor relations with Czechoslovakia and Lithuania (notably, due to the dispute over Vilnius). Hungary had similar tensions with both Romania and Czechoslovakia. Such conflicts had prevented Poland from joining the Little Entente. Over the next two decades, the region's political arena had been largely dominated by treaties and alliances similar to the Polish–Romanian alliance.

== See also ==
- German–Polish declaration of non-aggression
- Balkan Pact
- Balkan Pact (1953)
- Croatian–Romanian–Slovak friendship proclamation
- Latin Axis (World War II)
- Little Entente
- Intermarium
- Romanian Bridgehead
