= Latin Axis (World War II) =

Proposed international alliance during World War II

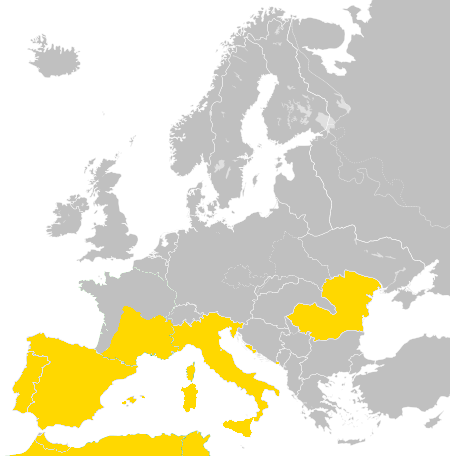
Latin Axis countries shown in yellow

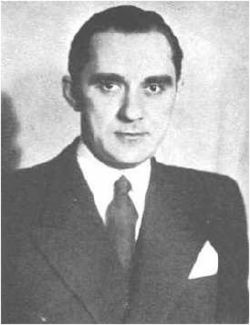
Mihai Antonescu

The Latin Axis was a proposed alliance between European ethno-linguistically Romance (Latin) countries during the Second World War. This project was proposed to Italy by Romanian politician Mihai Antonescu, who served as Deputy Prime Minister and Foreign Minister during World War II, under Ion Antonescu. The alliance would have included Romania, Italy, Vichy France, Spain, and Portugal. As a consolidated bloc in a region of German weakness, he hoped that it might become a significant counterweight to the Reich. Germany supported the proposal for the Latin Bloc during World War II and German propaganda assisted Italian propaganda in promoting the bloc. However, the alliance failed to materialize. Germany's Führer Adolf Hitler promoted the Latin Bloc and in October 1940 travelled to Hendaye, France, on the border with Spain to meet Francisco Franco with whom he promoted Spain forming a Latin bloc with Italy and Vichy France to join Italy's fight against the United Kingdom in the Mediterranean region.

== See also ==
- Latin Bloc (proposed alliance)
- Greater Germanic Reich
- Greater East Asia Co-Prosperity Sphere
- Little Entente
- Croatian–Romanian–Slovak friendship proclamation
- Intermarium
- Little Entente of Women
- Balkan Pact
- Balkan Pact (1953)
- Polish–Romanian alliance
