= Bled agreement =

Bled agreement may refer to:

- Bled agreement (1938), the agreement between Hungary and the Little Entente
- Bled agreement (1947), the agreement between Yugoslavia and Bulgaria
