= Latin Bloc (proposed alliance) =

1920s-1940s proposal for Italy-France-Spain-Portugal

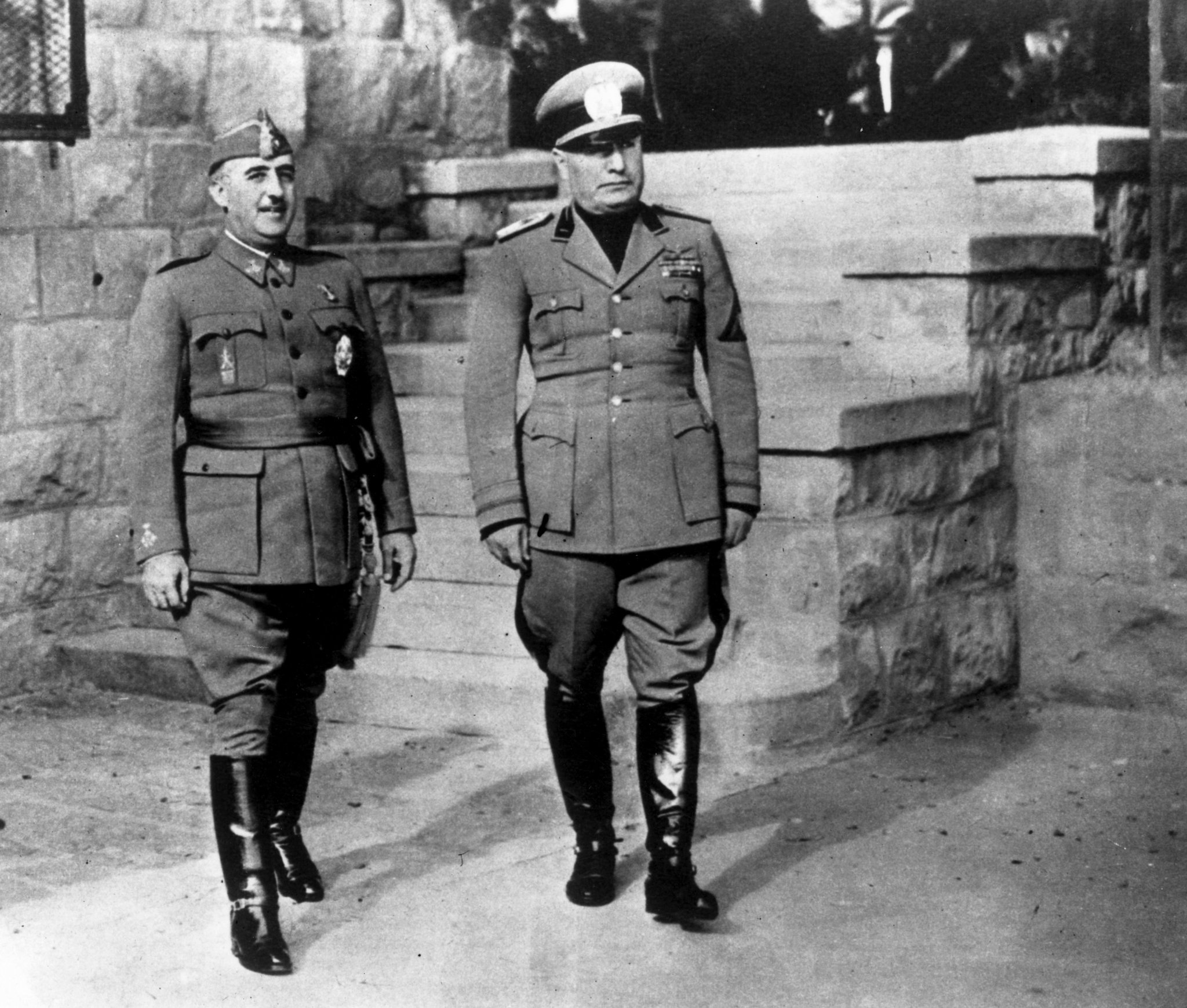
Spanish Caudillo Franco with Italian Duce Benito Mussolini in 1941.

The Latin Bloc (Italian: Blocco Latino; French: Bloc Latin; Spanish: Bloque Latino; Portuguese: Bloco Latino; Romanian: Blocul Latin) was a proposal for an alliance made between the 1920s to the 1940s that began with Italy's Duce Benito Mussolini proposing such a bloc in 1927 between Italy, France, Spain, Portugal and possibly Romania, that would be an alliance based upon common Latin civilization and culture. The proposal was publicly discussed between the governments of Italy, Spain, and France, during World War II.

In the 1930s, French Prime Minister Pierre Laval alongside French conservatives expressed support for a Latin Bloc with Italy and Spain.

During World War II the proposal was discussed between Mussolini, Spain's Caudillo Francisco Franco, and Vichy France's head of state Philippe Petain. However the alliance failed to materialize. The planned bloc would have united Italy, France, Spain, Portugal, and Vatican City together as a bloc alliance based upon unity of the Latin culture European states that would be within the Axis powers that was designed to balance the power between them and Germany in the Axis by combining. The main effort was to create a "Rome-Madrid axis", Franco took a major role in promoting the proposal, meeting with Vichy French leader Petain in Montpellier, France in 1940 to discuss the proposal, and with Mussolini in Bordighera, Italy in 1941 to discuss it. Germany supported the proposal for the Latin Bloc during World War II and German propaganda assisted Italian propaganda in promoting the bloc However the alliance failed to materialize. Germany's Führer Adolf Hitler promoted the Latin Bloc and in October 1940, travelled to Hendaye, France on the border with Spain to meet Franco in which he promoted Spain forming a Latin Bloc with Italy and Vichy France to join Italy's fight against Britain in the Mediterranean region.

== See also ==
- Fascist Italy
- Greater Germanic Reich
- Greater East Asia Co-Prosperity Sphere
- Francoist Spain
- French colonial empire
- Italian Empire
- Latin Axis (World War II)
- Pan-Latinism
- Spanish Empire
- Vichy France
