= Bled agreement (1938) =

1938 treaty between Hungary and the Little Entente

The Bled agreement of 22 August 1938 revoked some of the restrictions placed on Hungary by the Treaty of Trianon for its involvement on the losing side in World War I. Representatives of Hungary and three of its neighbours—the so-called "Little Entente" of Czechoslovakia, Romania and Yugoslavia—first met at Bled in Yugoslavia on 21 August. The next day, they announced a joint renunciation of the use of force in their mutual relations, and the Little Entente recognised Hungary as having an equal right to armaments.

That gave Hungary legal cover for the recreation of the Hungarian Air Force, which had already begun in secret, and for the increase of the Hungarian Army's manpower, guns and munitions.

== Background ==
There had been efforts at rapprochement between Hungary and Czechoslovakia in February and June 1937 during which the latter had asked for a mutual non-aggression pact as part of any deal recognising Hungary's right to re-arm. As the re-armament had already occurred on a limited scale without protest from Czechoslovakia or its allies, Hungary rejected the overtures.

Two events convinced the Hungarians to pursue an accord with the Little Entente. One was the Salonika Agreement of 31 July by which Bulgaria had obtained permission to re-arm from the members of the Balkan Pact, including Yugoslavia and Romania. The other was Romania's enactment in early August of a minority protection statute that was more liberal than Hungary had expected. Thus, although Hungary was willing to negotiate non-aggression and re-armament with the Entente as a unit, it reserved the question of minorities to individual agreements with the member states.

The timing of the agreement was related to the scheduled launching of the German cruiser Prinz Eugen by the Hungarian first lady, Magdolna Purgly, on 22 August. The Hungarian government believed that its position towards Germany would be strengthened if it had a pact with the Little Entente completed by the time that officials from both countries would meet in Kiel for the cruiser's launch.

== Czechoslovakia's isolation ==
The accord was the biggest piece of international news in the evening papers in London on the night of 22 August. It was also praised in the press in France and the Little Entente. It was met with anger by Germany.

The actual agreement was complicated and incomplete. Although the question of the Hungarian minority in Romania had been resolved earlier that month, the same question with regards to Yugoslavia and Czechoslovakia was still open. On three points of dispute, the Hungarians and the Yugoslavs came to an understanding in separate accords that were appended to the general accord and initialed but not signed. A final agreement between Hungary and Czechoslovakia on the minority question remained uninitialed because the latter could not satisfy the former's stronger demands. Czechoslovak Foreign Minister Kamil Krofta informed the Yugoslavs before the conference that although it was "a case of discrimination [against us]... we wish to contribute to an agreement". The result was that Hungary could come to a general agreement with all three of its neighbours but hold up implementation with respect to the only one that bordered Germany as well: Czechoslovakia.

Only Italy saw the agreement for what it was. The Italian foreign minister, Galeazzo Ciano, remarked that it "marked a new phase in the crumbling of the Little Entente. Czechoslovakia is isolated. The French system of friendships is completely upset". The Bled conference itself was held without Italy or Austria being consulted and so was in violation of the Rome Protocols, which had been agreed to by the three powers in 1934, and of their supplementary agreements made during conferences at Rome (20–23 March 1936) and Vienna (11–12 November 1936). (At the latter, Hungary had received recognition that the Little Entente states had an interest in its re-armament.)

On 23 August, the Hungarian prime minister, Béla Imrédy, and foreign minister, Kálmán Kánya, met their German counterparts, Adolf Hitler and Joachim von Ribbentrop, at the naval review in Kiel. The Germans, especially Ribbentrop, were incensed at the recently published agreement since they were contemplating war against Czechoslovakia. On 25 August in Berlin, Ribbentrop further pressured Kánya about Hungary's reaction to a German invasion of Czechoslovakia. Kánya suggested that the Bled agreement might be invalidated by making demands on the Entente and that Hungary's armed forces would be prepared to partake in a Czechoslovak conflict as early as 1 October. Hitler told Kánya directly that Hungary, if it wanted to benefit from the partition of Czechoslovakia, must work towards making that happen: "He who wants to sit at the table must at least help in the kitchen". The Hungarian military would certainly not have been ready to participate in any conflict by October 1, as both governments must have known.

== Hungary's excessive demands ==
The method proposed by Kánya to the Germans to invalidate the Bled agreement was to "make excessive demands on the matter of the [Hungarian] minorities in the Little Entente states". On 1 September 1938, in Budapest, Imrédy gave an interview to a diplomatic correspondent of The Daily Telegraph in which, the newspaper reported the next morning, he downplayed the significance of the agreement as it had been reported by the London papers because its full implementation would come about only when the question of Hungarian minorities had been settled.

The Bled agreement contains an early indication of the ebb of the prestige of the League of Nations. The Permanent Council of the Little Entente recognised that "in existing circumstances the League of Nations cannot completely carry out the tasks entrusted to it by the authors of the Covenant". A communiqué of the Yugoslav government, dated 31 August, clarified that Yugoslavia "had not renounced her prior obligations" by signing the Bled agreement. Hermann Göring, however, told the Hungarian government on 9 September that the Yugoslav regent, Prince Paul, had assured him that he would "in no circumstances intervene against Hungary, not even if the latter got involved in a conflict with Czechoslovakia".

== Hungarian re-armament ==
Almost from its signing, the Treaty of Trianon had been contravened by "secret" re-armament under tight budgetary constraints. Although that was general knowledge, Hungary's neighbours and the great powers looked the other way. The official Hungarian position had been that Hungary had a right to re-arm, but the Bled agreement gave it legal cover so that the re-armament programme could shed its nominal secrecy.

Even before Trianon, Hungary had begun to plan its secret air force and lay the administrative groundwork. In the 1920s, however, the victorious powers' Aviation Supervisory Committee quashed every effort to circumvent disarmament. In 1932, a plan for a future air force of 48 squadrons was approved. In March 1935, the Director of the Aviation Office, who was de facto commander of the secret air force, urged "set[ting] the goal that we become a serious opponent towards at least one of the surrounding Little Entente states". By 1 October 1937, the secret air force had reached a strength of 192 planes.

As expected, Hungary was not prepared for war by 1 October, but on 6 October, all air force units (except for two short-range reconnaissance squadrons) were ordered to ready for deployment. None was ready on time. In the end, the air force was not needed, as Italy and Germany mediated the First Vienna Award, which solved Hungary's revisionist claims on Czechoslovakia without war. There was conflict within the government over command of the air force until 1 January 1939, when it was finally proclaimed a separate branch of the armed forces. It received its baptism of fire during the brief Slovak–Hungarian War (23 March – 4 April 1939).

== See also ==
- Czechoslovakia–Yugoslavia relations

== Sources ==
- Ádám, Magda (1999). "The Munich Crisis and Hungary: The Fall of the Versailles Settlement in Central Europe". Diplomacy and Statecraft. 10 (2–3): 82–121. doi:10.1080/09592299908406126.
- Boisdron, Matthieu (2014). "Les accords de Bled : la France, la Petite Entente et l'attribution de l'égalité des droits à la Hongrie (septembre 1937–octobre 1938)". In Bene, Krisztián; Dávid, Ferenc (eds.). Entre coopération et antagonismes: Les dimensions des relations franco-hongroises, de l'époque moderne à l'intégration européenne. Codex. pp. 69–86. ISBN 978-2-918783-07-7.
- Bán, András D. (2004). Hungarian–British Diplomacy, 1938–1941: The Attempt to Maintain Relations. Translated by Tim Wilkinson. London: Frank Cass. ISBN 0714656607.
- H. L. (1936). "The Rome Protocols and the Question of the Danube Basin". Bulletin of International News. 13 (11): 3–9.
- Krempa, Geoffrey K. (2008). "Reacting to Hitler: Polish, Hungarian, Lithuanian, and Romanian Foreign Policy, 1933–1939". Masters Theses and Doctoral Dissertations. 191.
- Oldson, William A. (1977). "Romania and the Munich Crisis, August–September 1938". East European Quarterly. 11 (2): 177–90.
- Roman, Eric (1974). "Munich and Hungary: An Overview of Hungarian Diplomacy during the Sudeten Crisis". East European Quarterly. 8 (1): 71–97.
- Shirer, William Lawrence (1960). The Rise and Fall of the Third Reich: A History of Nazi Germany. New York City: Simon & Schuster. LCCN 60006729. OCLC 1286630. OL 5794925M. Wikidata Q138029595.
- Spira, Thomas (1981). "Hungary and the Little Entente: The Failed Rapprochement of 1937". Südost Forschungen. 40: 144–63.
- Szabó, Miklós (2005). "Establishment of the Hungarian Air Force and the Activity of the Hungarian Royal Honvéd Air Force in World War II Respectively" (PDF). Nação e Defesa. 3rd ser. 110: 191–210. Archived from the original (PDF) on 14 July 2014.
- Winchester, Betty Jo (1973). "Hungary and the 'Third Europe' in 1938". Slavic Review. 32 (4): 741–56. doi:10.2307/2495494. JSTOR 2495494.
- Winchester, Betty Jo (1976). "Hungary and the Austrian Anschluss". East European Quarterly. 10 (4): 409–25.
