= Balkan Pact =

1934 treaty among various Balkan nations to maintain the post-WWI status quo

Balkan Entente: Βαλκανικό Σύμφωνο (Greek); Înțelegerea Balcanică (Romanian); Balkan Antantı (Turkish); Балкански пакт/Balkanski pakt (Serbo-Croatian)
- 1934–1941
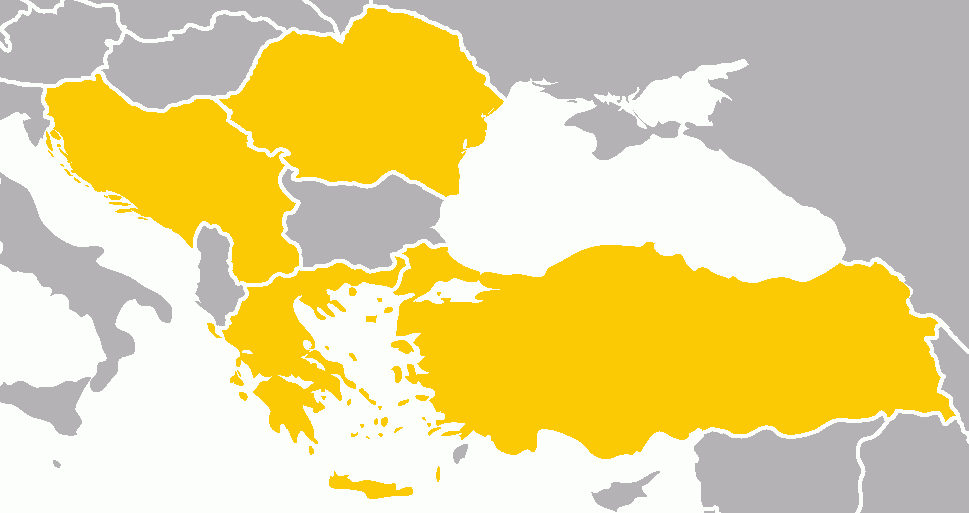
- Members of the Balkan Pact Balkan Pact: Greece; Romania; Turkey; Yugoslavia
- Status: Military alliance
- Historical era: Interwar
  - Formation: 9 February 1934
  - Axis invasion of Yugoslavia: 6 April 1941

The Balkan Pact, or Balkan Entente, was a treaty signed by Greece, Romania, Turkey and Yugoslavia on 9 February 1934 in Athens, aimed at maintaining the geopolitical status quo in the region after the end of World War I. To present a united front against Bulgarian designs on their territories, the signatories agreed to suspend all disputed territorial claims against one another and their immediate neighbours following the aftermath of the war and a rise in various regional irredentist tensions.

== Nations which refused to sign the treaty ==
Other nations in the region that had been involved in related diplomacy refused to sign the document, including Italy, Albania, Bulgaria, Hungary and the Soviet Union. The pact became effective on the day that it was signed and was registered in the League of Nations Treaty Series on 1 October 1934.

== Effects and decision to allow Bulgaria to rearm ==
The Balkan Pact helped to ensure peace between the signatory nations but failed to end regional intrigues. Although the pact was designed against Bulgaria, on 31 July 1938, its members signed the Salonika Agreement with Bulgaria, which repealed the clauses of the Treaty of Neuilly-sur-Seine and Treaty of Lausanne that had mandated demilitarised zones at Bulgaria's borders with Greece and Turkey, which allowed Bulgaria to rearm.

== Collapse with the invasion of Yugoslavia and the occupation of Greece ==
With the 1940 Treaty of Craiova signed by Romania under Nazi Germany's pressure, and after the 1941 Axis invasions of Yugoslavia and Greece, the pact effectively ceased to exist and Turkey remained as its only signatory that had avoided any conflict during WWII, even after joining the Allies in 1945.

== See also ==
- Balkan Pact (1953)
- Latin Axis (World War II)
- Polish–Romanian alliance
- Little Entente
- Croatian–Romanian–Slovak friendship proclamation
