= Little Entente =

Alliance formed in 1920 and 1921 by Czechoslovakia, Romania and Yugoslavia

Little Entente Malá dohoda Mica Antantă Мала Антанта/Mala Antanta
- 1921–1938
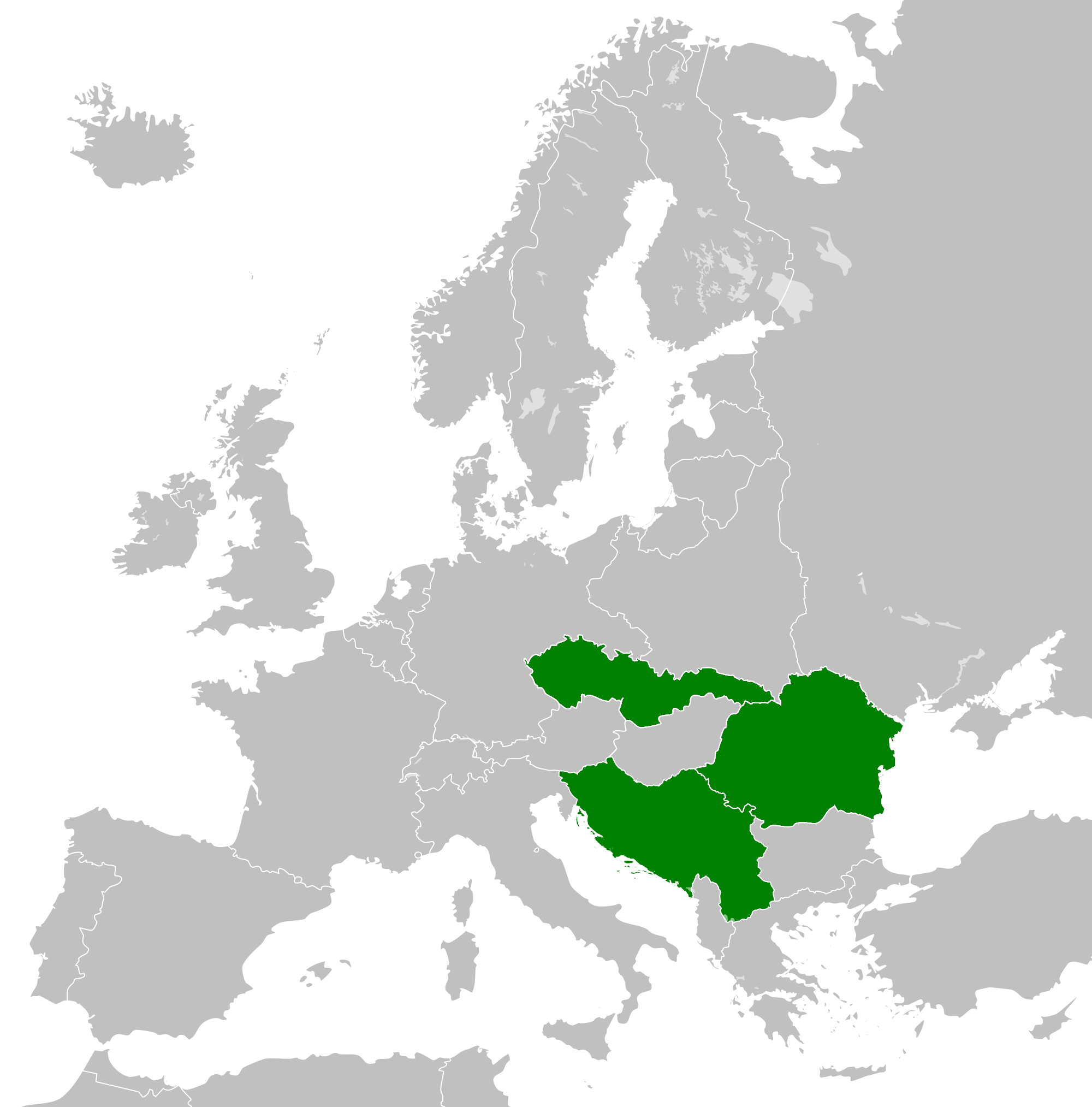
- The Little Entente in 1937 Members: Czechoslovakia; Romania; Yugoslavia; Support: France
- Status: Military alliance
- Historical era: Interwar
  - Formation: 1921
  - Dissolved: 1938

The Little Entente was an alliance formed in 1920 and 1921 by Czechoslovakia, Romania and the Kingdom of Serbs, Croats and Slovenes (Yugoslavia from 1929 on) with the purpose of common defense against Hungarian revisionism and the prospect of a Habsburg restoration in Austria or Hungary. France supported the alliance by signing treaties with each member country. The rapid growth of German power caused its collapse in 1938, and it never went into wartime operation.

== Origins ==
The first attempts seeking a mutual defense of the successor states of Austria-Hungary took place during the Paris Peace Conference of 1919. The most remarkable and ardent proponent of the certain alliance binding the successor states was Edvard Beneš, the foreign minister of Czechoslovakia from 1918 to 1935. Beneš played such a crucial role in establishing the Little Entente that he was regarded as its real founder.

It also clearly reflected his belief in the necessity to develop democracy in not only Czechoslovakia but also other European states.

The obvious aim of his proposed alliance was to prevent the resurgence of Hungarian power and the restoration of the Habsburg monarchy, but its real purpose followed a much broader pattern. The alliance was designed to stop any encroachments on the independence of the member states committed by any European power. Beneš, therefore, intended to gain the respect of Hungary and other powers such as France, Germany and the United Kingdom. In addition, the Little Entente was to strengthen the influence of its member states in international deliberations.

Another interpretation is based on considerations of the new balance of power in Europe after World War I. France planned to contain possible German aggression by forming an arrangement with Germany's neighbours. Before World War I, Russia had served that purpose, but after the war, France was reluctant to establish normal diplomatic ties with the Soviet Union, Russia's successor. Therefore, France sought alternative states near Germany with close ties to France. As the Little Entente fulfilled those conditions, France strongly supported its formation.

== Formation ==
A collective defense arrangement was signed in Belgrade on August 14, 1920, during a convention of Czechoslovakia and the Kingdom of Serbs, Croats and Slovenes. The treaty guaranteed mutual assistance in the event of an unprovoked attack launched by Hungary against any stipulator. Ratifications were exchanged in Belgrade on February 10, 1921. Subsequently, Beneš suggested participation in the emerging alliance to Romania on August 17, 1920, but his offer was rejected by the Romanian government. Although the mentioned treaty was signed, it did not serve as a regular allied convention.

The allied conventions that formed the Little Entente were signed as follows:

- The treaty between Czechoslovakia and Romania signed on April 23, 1921, in Bucharest. Ratifications were exchanged in Bucharest on May 27, 1921. The treaty was prolonged by a supplementary protocols signed on May 7, 1923, June 13, 1926, and May 21, 1929.
- The treaty between the Kingdom of Serbs, Croats and Slovenes and Romania signed on June 7, 1921 in Belgrade. The treaty was prolonged by supplementary protocol on May 21, 1929.
- The treaty between Czechoslovakia and the Kingdom of Serbs, Croats and Slovenes signed on August 31, 1922, in Belgrade. Ratifications were exchanged in Belgrade on October 3, 1922. The treaty was prolonged by additional protocols signed on September 19, 1928 and May 21, 1929.

The mentioned conventions encompassed almost identical terms as the treaty of August 14, 1920. Again, it was stated that in the event of an unprovoked attack employed by Hungary against a certain stipulator, other parties should provide mutual assistance. In addition, the treaties defined the mutual assistance via a special military convention that was to be signed. Until such a convention came into force, interim measures were to be taken. The member states of the Little Entente also pledged themselves to co-operation in foreign policy towards Hungary.

- All of those conventions were replaced by a comprehensive treaty of alliance between the governments of Romania, Yugoslavia and Czechoslovakia, signed in Štrbské Pleso (now Slovakia) on June 27, 1930, and entered into effect "immediately", according to Article 6. The treaty created a regular consultative structure for the Little Entente and required the ministers of foreign affairs of the parties to meet at least once a year. It was registered in League of Nations Treaty Series on October 3, 1930. Ratifications were exchanged in Prague on November 25, 1930.

During its formation, the Little Entente had to prove its determination of being a safeguard against any restoration sponsored by the Habsburgs.

Firstly, Charles I of Austria returned to Hungary from Switzerland on March 26, 1921. He reclaimed the Hungarian throne, but his action earned neither the support of Miklós Horthy nor the consent of the Little Entente. Thus, Charles was forced to leave the country on April 1, 1921. On October 20, 1921, however, he returned to Hungary and renewed his claims. The situation was complicated by the fact that Charles had managed to gain the support of a certain part of the army.

The Little Entente reacted promptly, under the guidance of Beneš. Its member states began to mobilize their armies, and the threat of direct involvement from them was imminent. Moreover, other European powers expressed their opposition to Charles's attempts at restoration. The Hungarian government defeated Charles's followers and arrested him on October 24, 1921. That was followed by the Hungarian reluctance to deprive Charles of his titles and the increasing danger of a military incursion of the Little Entente into Hungary. Finally, the Hungarian government passed an act abrogating Charles's sovereign rights on November 10, 1921.

== Consolidation ==
Although the thwarted restoration of the Habsburgs was an unambiguous success, subsequent events revealed increasing tensions within the alliance. The Genoa Conference (April 10 to May 19, 1922) highlighted the different opinions among the member states. The problem arose from the possible recognition of the Soviet Union by its European counterparts. Czechoslovakia was mainly an industrial state and so it was disposed to normalise its relations with the Soviet Union and to recognize the newly-formed state. The Kingdom of Serbs, Croats and Slovenes and Romania, however, were both agrarian countries that were uninterested in economic co-operation with the Soviet Union. Nevertheless, all member states participating in the Little Entente considered the Soviet Union as a threat.

In the 1920s, France, as the main supporter of the Little Entente, pursued its policy towards the tightening of the alliance by launching a series of friendship treaties aimed at forging the relations between France; Czechoslovakia; the Kingdom of Serbs, Croats and Slovenes; and Romania. The mentioned treaties were signed as follows:

- The Treaty of Alliance and Friendship between France and Czechoslovakia, signed on January 25, 1924, in Paris, which was concluded for an unlimited time.
- The Treaty of Friendship between France and Romania, signed on June 10, 1926 in Paris, which was originally concluded for 10 years, but it was extended for another 10 years on November 8, 1936.
- The Treaty of Friendship between France and Kingdom of Serbs, Croats and Slovenes, signed on November 11, 1927 in Paris, which was originally concluded for five years, but it was extended on November 10, 1932 and December 2, 1937.

The treaties obliged the parties to consult their foreign policies, particularly the security matters of the involved states.

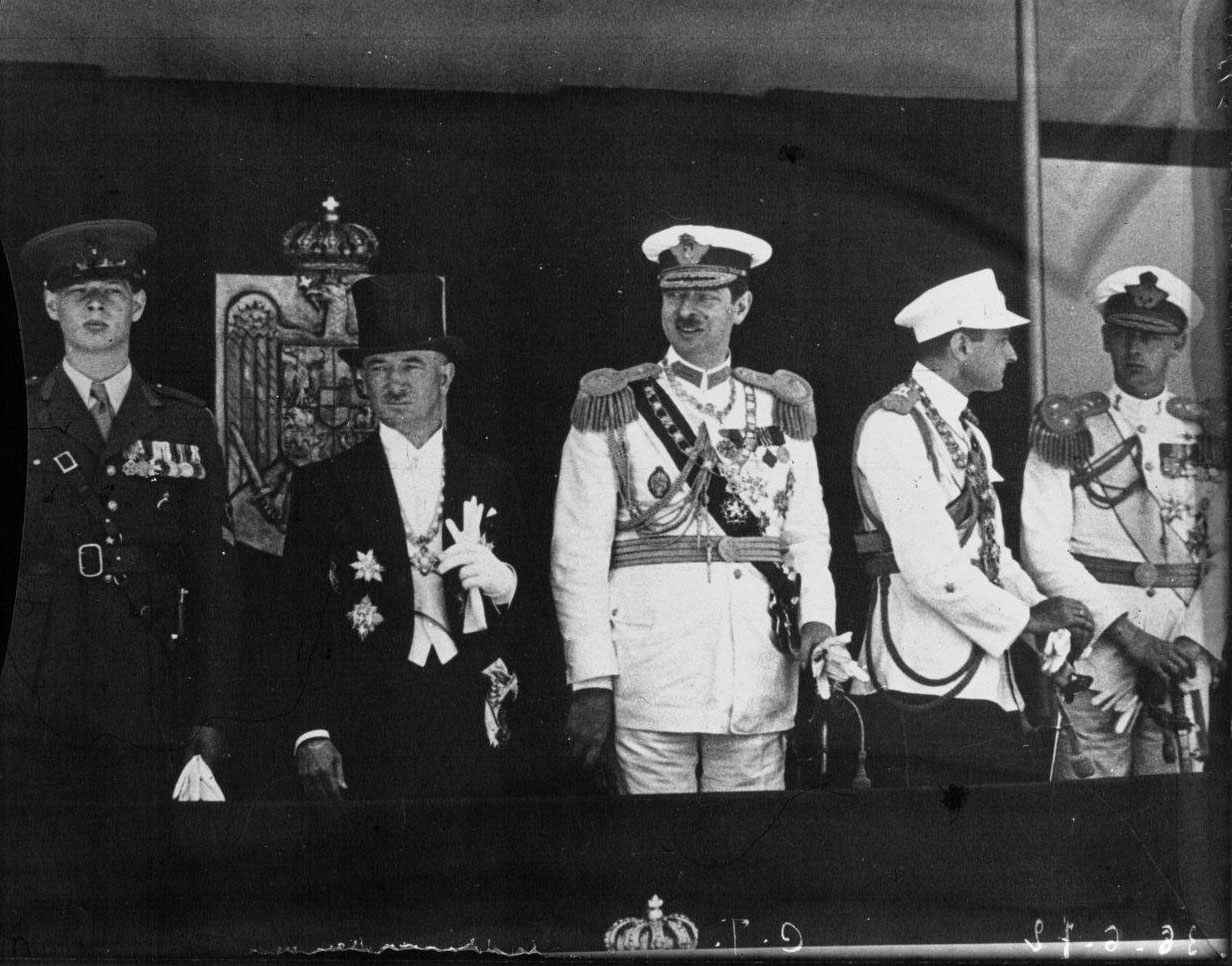
Officials of the Little Entente countries in Bucharest, Romania in 1936. From left to right: Prince Michael (Rom.), President Edvard Beneš (Cze.), King Carol II (Rom.), Prince Regent Paul (Yug.), and Prince Nicholas (Rom.).

The successful performance of the Little Entente resulted in its institutionalisation. Guided by this purpose, the Pact of Organisation, also called The Little Entente System or The Reorganisation Pact, was signed in Geneva on February 16, 1933. Ratifications were exchanged in Prague on May 30, 1933, and the treaty became effective on the same day. It was registered in League of Nations Treaty Series on July 4, 1933. The treaty was delivered by Ministers of Foreign Affairs of the member states: Bogoljub Jevtić for Yugoslavia, Nicolae Titulescu for Romania, and Edvard Beneš for Czechoslovakia. The aim of the Pact of Organisation was to provide a legal framework for a permanent collaboration among the member states. The objective was to be reached by an establishing of new institutions operating on behalf of the member states within the Little Entente. The main instruments of collaboration were:

- The Permanent Council was to consist of the ministers of foreign affairs of the three respective countries or of the special delegates appointed for that purpose. Decisions of the council were to be brought unanimously. The council was designed to meet at least three times per year. The mentioned meetings were to be held in each of the member states and in Geneva during the session of the League of Nations.
- The Secretariat of the Permanent Council was to perform the day-to-day routine operations of the Little Entente. In addition, a certain section of the secretariat was aimed to function permanently in the seat of the League of Nations.
- The Economic Council was implemented by which the member states declared their will to co-ordinate its economic interests as well.

== Disbandment ==
The resurgence of German power after 1933 had gradually undermined French influence in the Little Entente countries.

In 1938, the harsh opposition to any concessions from the three countries' new territories began to receive less French support. On 22 August, France signed the Bled agreement, revoking certain restrictions placed on Hungary by the Treaty of Trianon. On 30 September, the Munich Agreement was signed, granting Germany parts of Czechoslovakia.

France had seen the Little Entente as an opportunity, in the interests of French security, to revitalize the threat of a two-front war against Germany. To relieve that threat in 1934, Croatian Ustaše and possibly Italy, Hungary and Bulgaria backed revolutionary Vlado Chernozemski, who assassinated King Alexander I of Yugoslavia and the French minister of foreign affairs, two leading proponents of the Little Entente. That was a prelude to World War II.

== Croatian–Romanian–Slovak friendship proclamation ==
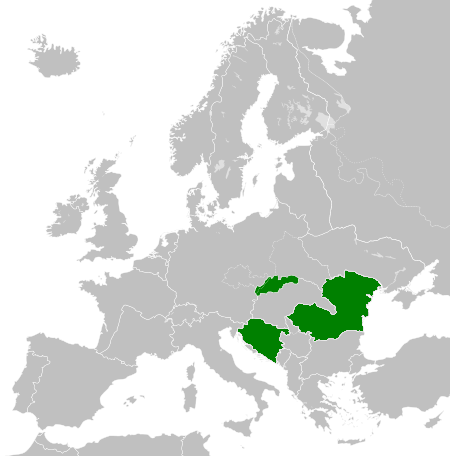
Romania, Croatia and Slovakia in 1942

During World War II, Romania, the Independent State of Croatia and the Slovak State formed an alliance similar to the Little Entente with the purpose of stopping any further Hungarian expansion. The alliance was formed by Romanian Marshal Ion Antonescu.

== See also ==
- Balkan Pact
- Bulgarian coup d'état of 1934
- Cordon sanitaire (international relations)
- Greater Hungary (political concept)
- Latin Axis (World War II)
- Little Entente of Women
- Locarno Treaties
- Triple Entente
- Czechoslovakia–Yugoslavia relations
