= Salonika Agreement =

1938 treaty between the Balkan Entente and Bulgaria

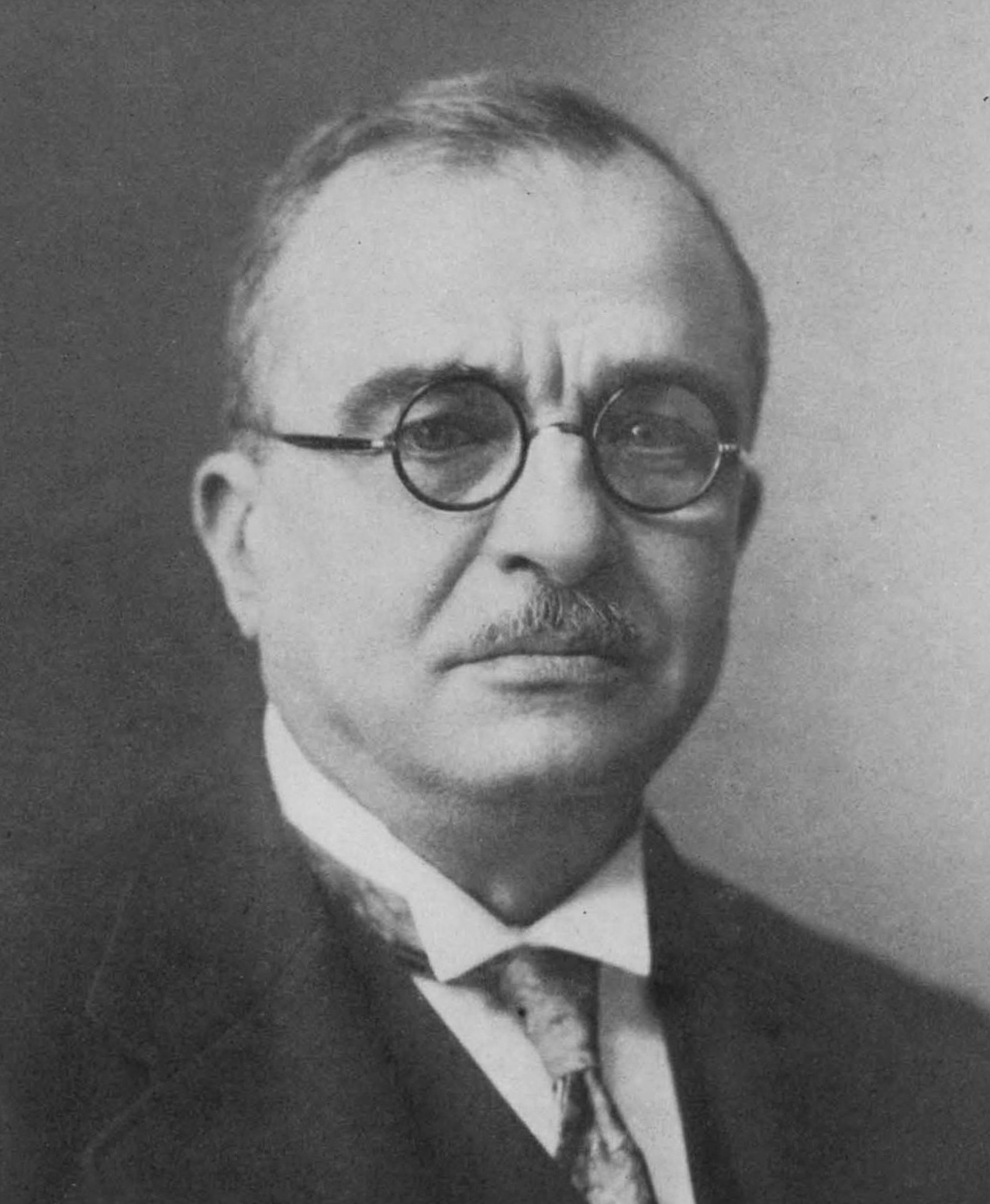
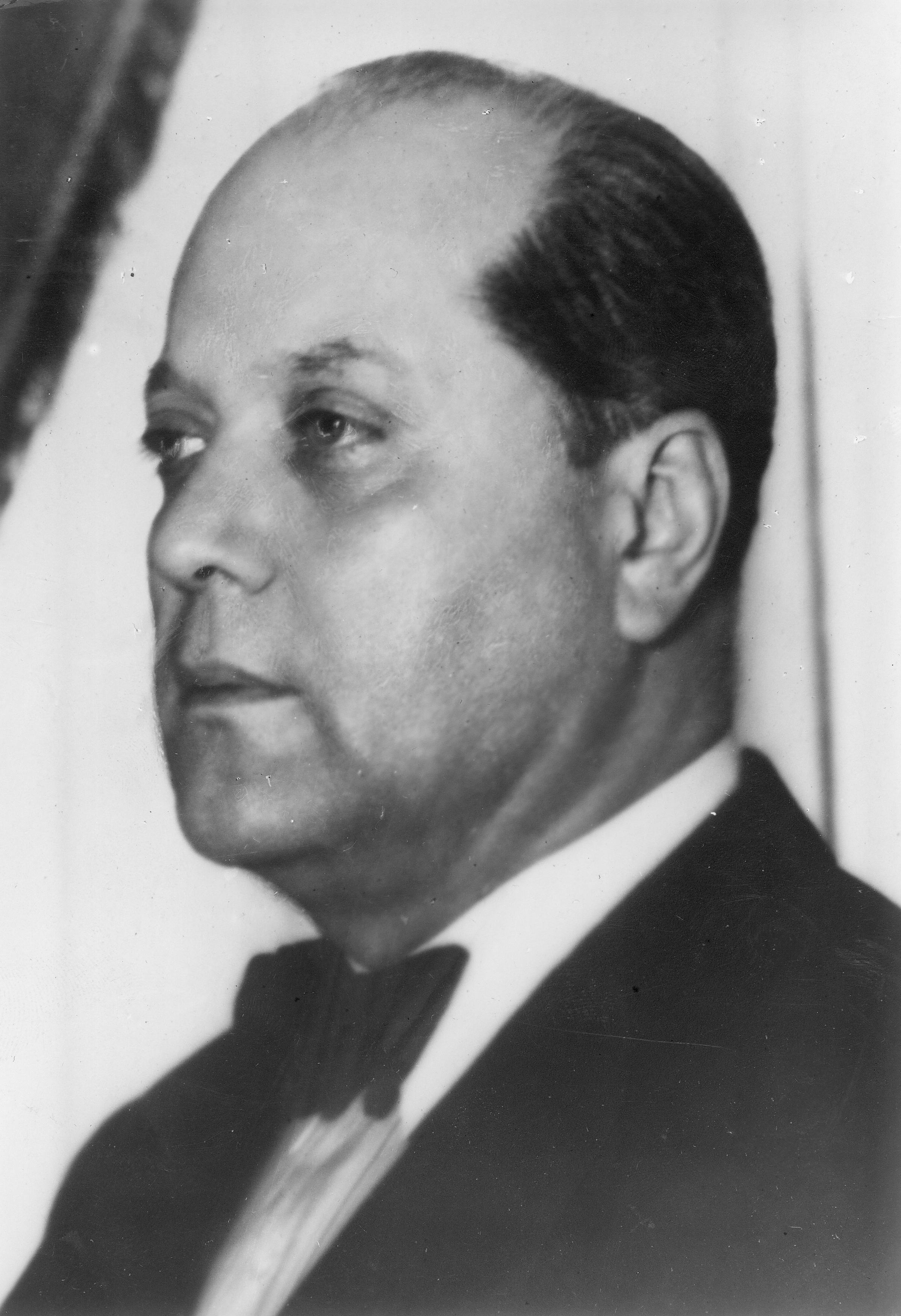
Metaxas (left) and Kyoseivanov (right), the two signatories of the agreement

The Salonika Agreement (also called the Thessaloniki Accord) was a treaty signed on 31 July 1938 between Bulgaria and the Balkan Entente (Greece, Romania, Turkey and Yugoslavia). The signatories were, for the former, Prime Minister Georgi Kyoseivanov and, for the latter, in his capacity as President of the Council of the Balkan Entente, Ioannis Metaxas, Prime Minister and Foreign Minister of Greece.

== Background ==
The agreement was the result of the realization by the Entente that Bulgaria alone could not threaten the members of the Entente acting in concert and that the Bulgarian government desired to follow a policy of peace. That was shown by at least two signs. A protocol signed at Belgrade on 17 March 1934 by the Balkan Entente was published privately in May and revealed that the members had plans to occupy Bulgaria jointly if efforts to suppress terrorist organizations operating out of its territory were not successful. The new Bulgarian government of Kimon Georgiev, coming to power on 19 May, responded to the private revelation by clamping down on the Internal Macedonian Revolutionary Organization.

Also, on 24 January 1937, the Bulgarian–Yugoslav Treaty of Eternal Friendship was concluded, which was approved by the other members of the Entente although Greece was initially very hostile. In November 1936, the chiefs of staff of the four Balkan powers signed a draft military alliance, which was confirmed as an integral part of the Balkan Pact at the meeting of the Balkan Council on 15–18 February 1937.

== Terms ==
The agreement removed the arms restrictions placed on Bulgaria after World War I by the Treaty of Neuilly-sur-Seine and allowed it to occupy the demilitarised zone bordering Greece. The demilitarised zones along the Turkish borders with Bulgaria and Greece, a result of the Treaty of Lausanne, were also abandoned. All the parties committed to a policy of non-aggression, but Bulgaria was not forced to abandon its territorial revisionism.

== Bulgarian rearmament ==
Bulgaria had long protested the restrictions placed on armaments at Neuilly, but unlike Austria, Germany and Hungary, it had a good track record of abiding by them. In the 1930s, it began to evade them by buying military equipment from Germany since it was refused orders placed in the United Kingdom. The Bulgarians argued, with the support of the United States, that the League of Nations, which was designed to protect weak and disarmed states, was not powerful enough to protect Bulgaria.

In November 1937, when the pace of rearmament had picked up, a British memorandum advised a "blind eye" policy towards it and pressured the Entente and France to do the same to prevent Bulgaria from falling under the influence of the Italo-German Axis. The British memo specified that Bulgaria was set to violate all the pertinent articles of the treaty:

The relevant articles of the treaty are #78, which prohibits fortification of any further places in Bulgaria, #81, which prohibits the importation of arms, munitions, and war materials of all kinds, #82, prohibiting the manufacture and importation into Bulgaria of armoured cars, tanks and any similar machines suitable for use in war, #86, which prohibits the construction or acquisition of any submarine, even for commercial purposes and #89, which prohibits the inclusion in the armed forces of Bulgaria of any military or naval air forces.

Turkey strongly opposed Bulgaria's accelerated rearmament in 1934, especially on account of the weakness of the Greek army. By the time of the Salonika Agreement, however, the Greek and Turkish armies had recovered from the Greco-Turkish War (1919–1922), leaving it to be accepted as a fait accompli.

== Sources ==
- Barlas, Dilek (1998). Etatism and Diplomacy in Turkey: Economic and Foreign Policy Strategies in an Unknown World, 1929–39. Leiden: Brill. ISBN 9004108556.
- Leonard, Robert Glenn (2003). Trapped in the Past: Organizational Memory and Cultural Bias in Foreign Policy Formulation by the Western Democracies towards Bulgaria, 1935–1938. University of New Brunswick.
- M. B. (1941). "The German Threat to Bulgaria". Bulletin of International News. 18 (4): 191–97.
- Pundeff, Marin (1954). "The Balkan Entente Treaties". The American Journal of International Law. 48 (4): 635–40. doi:10.1017/S0002930000039063.
- Rizas, Sotiris (2011). "Geopolitics and Domestic Politics: Greece's Policy Towards the Great Powers During the Unravelling of the Inter-War Order, 1934–1936". Contemporary European History. 20 (2): 137–56. doi:10.1017/s0960777311000038.
- S. A. H. (1938). "Bulgaria and the Balkan Entente". Bulletin of International News. 15 (16): 3–7.
- Schreiber, Dr. Gerhard; Stegemann, Bernd; Vogel, Detlef (1995). The Mediterranean, South-East Europe, and North Africa, 1939-1941 : from Italy's Declaration of Non-belligerence to the Entry of the United States into the War. Oxford, United Kingdom: Oxford University Press. ISBN 978-0-19-822884-4.
