= Balkan Pact (1953) =

1953 Greek-Turkish-Yugoslav cooperation treaty

Agreement of Friendship and Cooperation
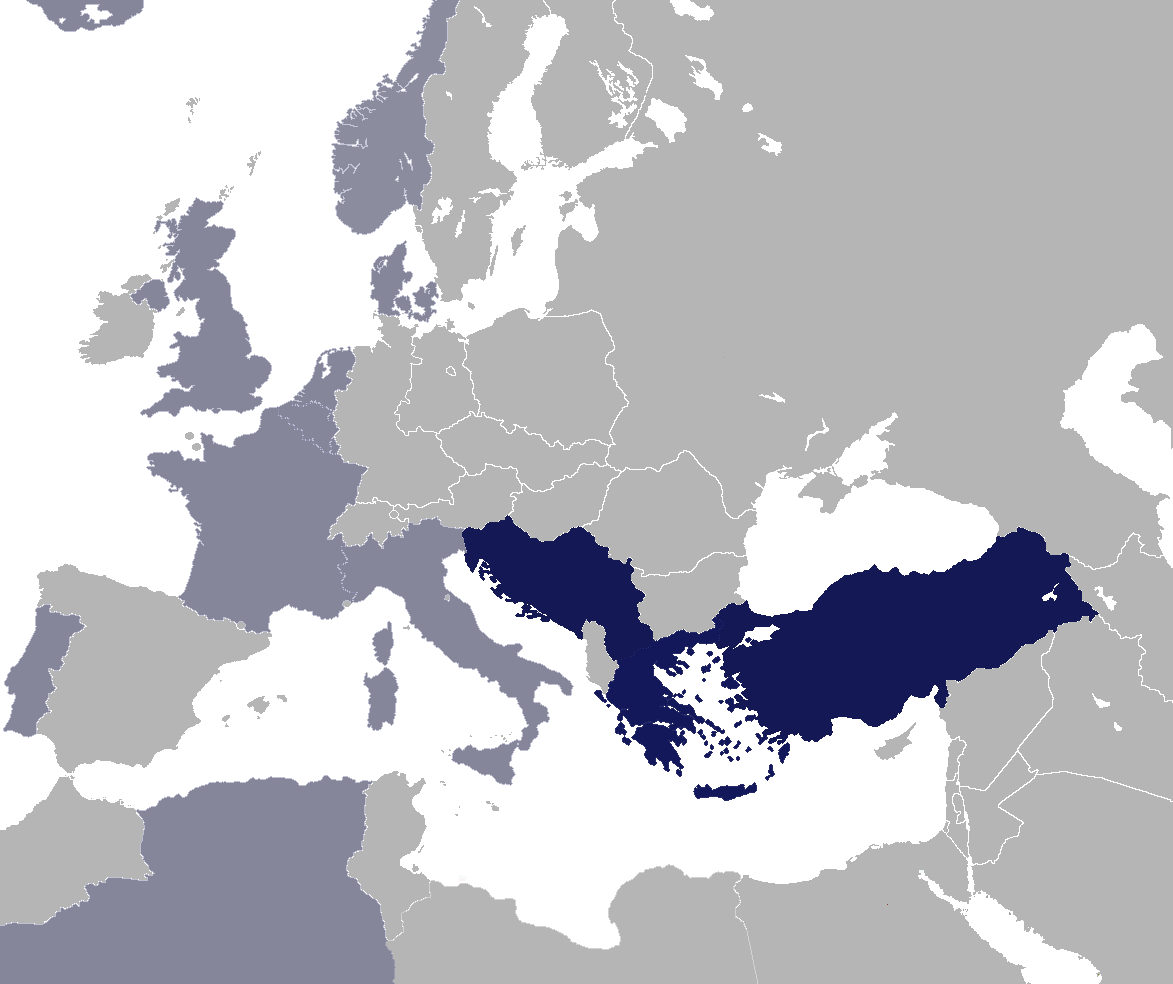
- Balkan Pact; Other NATO states
- Signed: 28 February 1953
- Location: Ankara, Turkey
- Expiration: Indefinite; never officially terminated
- Signatories: Greece; Turkey; Yugoslavia
- Languages: Greek, Serbo-Croatian, Turkish

The Balkan Pact (Greek: Βαλκανικό Σύμφωνο, Macedonian: Балкански пакт, Serbo-Croatian: Balkanski pakt / Балкански пакт, Slovene: Balkanski pakt, Turkish: Balkan Paktı) of 1953, officially known as the Agreement of Friendship and Cooperation, was a treaty signed by Greece, Turkey and Yugoslavia on 28 February 1953. It was signed in Ankara. The treaty was to act as a deterrence against Soviet expansion in the Balkans and provided for the eventual creation of a joint military staff for the three countries. When the pact was created and signed, Turkey and Greece had been members of the North Atlantic Treaty Organization (NATO) for a year, having both joined on 18 February 1952, while Yugoslavia was a socialist non-aligned state that later became a founding member of the Non-Aligned Movement. The Balkan Pact allowed Yugoslavia to de facto associate itself with NATO on geopolitical affairs while remaining officially neutral. In October 1954, Israeli government expressed their interest in joining the alliance in expectation that Yugoslavia would act as a mediator in development of the Egypt–Israel relations; Yugoslav authorities were open to the proposal. However, Israel never ended up joining the alliance.

== Background ==
Yugoslavia and the Soviet Union had been allies in the aftermath of World War II, but bilateral co-operation halted in 1948 through the Tito–Stalin split. Fearing a Soviet invasion, Yugoslavia quickly established political and defensive agreements with the Western countries. NATO considered Yugoslavia to be a strategically important country, so the Balkan Pact was perceived as a way for the Western allies to bring Yugoslavia into its sphere of influence in case of Soviet aggression. When the People's Republic of China entered the Korean War in December 1950, the leadership in Belgrade interpreted it as a test by Stalin for potential aggression against Yugoslavia. In response, Yugoslavia formally requested direct Western military and economic assistance that would from then on continue and expand until the normalization of Yugoslav-Soviet relations in 1956.

The pact was signed on 28 February 1953. The plan was to informally integrate Yugoslavia into the Western defensive system and economic aid system because of the increasing threats that Yugoslavia was receiving from Moscow.

== Agreement ==
The agreements regarding the creation of the Balkan Pact started with a political treaty in Ankara in February 1953 and ended with a military treaty in Bled in August 1954. The 14 articles included the settlement of international disputes without force, military assistance for each country if one of the members were attacked and the maintenance and the strengthening of the members' defensive capacity. The countries agreed that representatives from each country would meet twice a year until 1974. The agreement also kept previous treaties then in place such as the Treaty of Friendship and Co-operation and the Charter of the United Nations.

== Effects ==
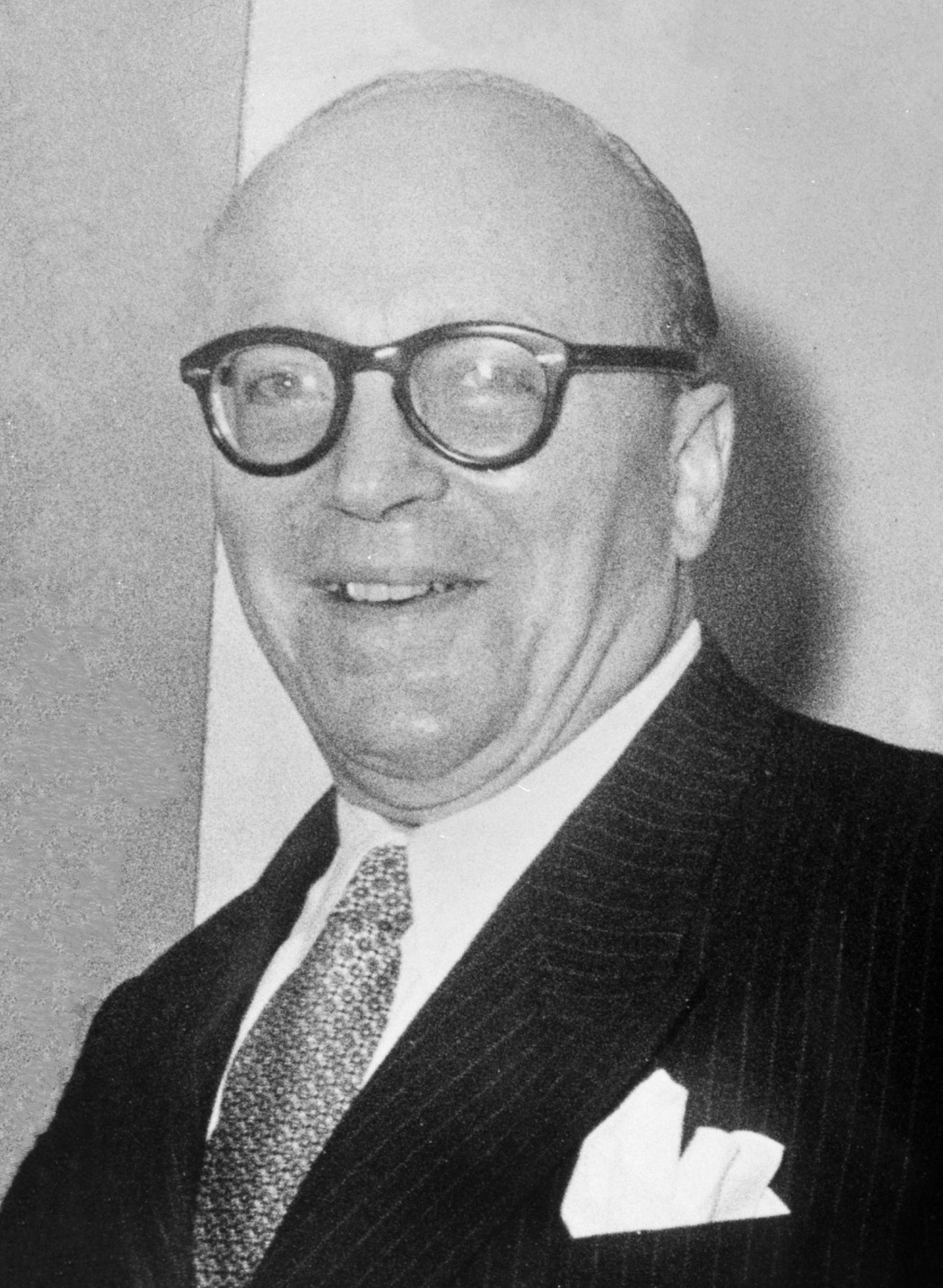
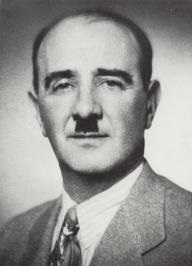
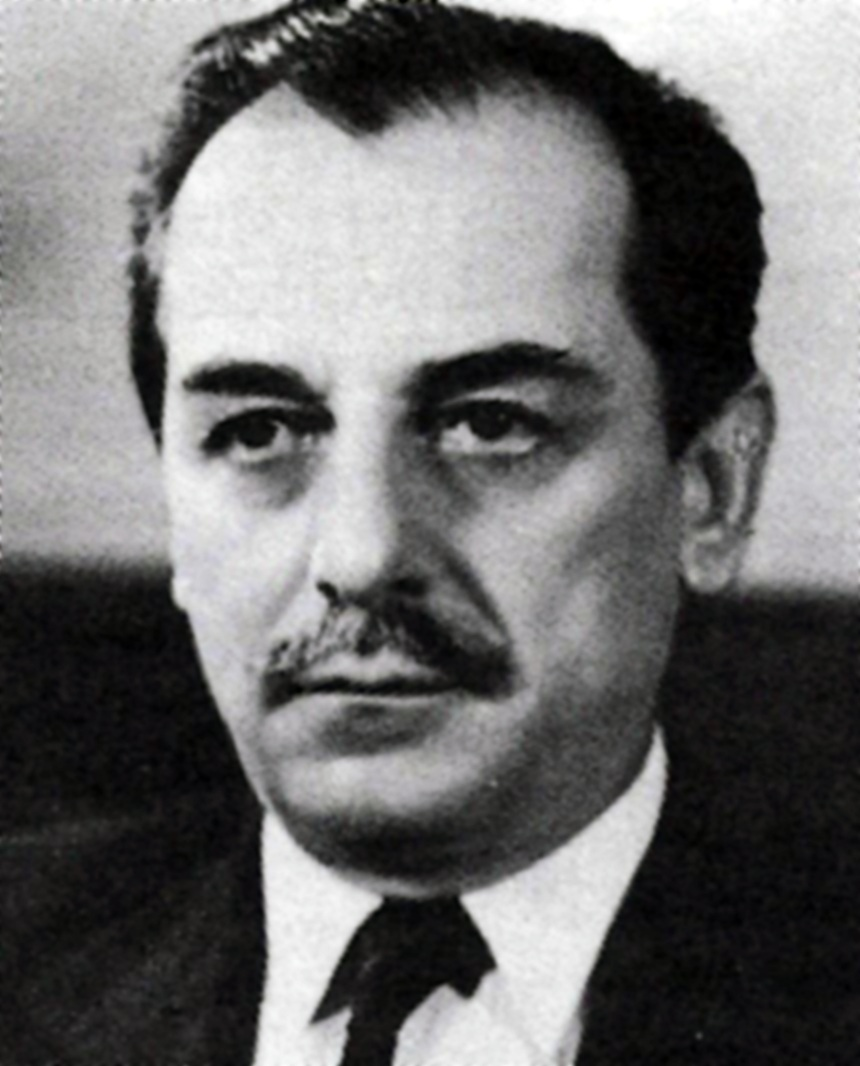
Signatories: (Kingdom of Greece) Stefanopoulos, (Turkey) Köprülü and (Socialist Federal Republic of Yugoslavia) Popović

The new alliance showed its weakness from the very beginning for several reasons. First of all, Joseph Stalin died a few days after it was signed. Also, the new Soviet government, led by Nikita Khrushchev, started to relax its criticism towards Yugoslavia. Finally, the Yugoslav communist leaders were more willing to abandon open cooperation with the Western countries.

In 1954 and 1955, Yugoslav overtures to the Soviet Union gradually resulted in a change of Yugoslav views regarding the military significance of the Balkan Pact. The visit of Turkish Prime Minister Adnan Menderes to Yugoslavia in May 1955, only three weeks before Khrushchev's visit to Josip Broz Tito, showed the difference between the Yugoslav and the Turkish views of the international situation. Menderes was interested in the whole field of co-operation within the Balkan Pact. Yugoslavia was reluctant to take any steps that might then appear to give added significance to the military side of the Balkan Pact.

The Cyprus dispute between Turkey and Greece soon broke out and became a new danger for the Balkan Pact.

After the Hungarian Revolution of 1956, Tito showed some interest in reviving the alliance, but because of the Cyprus dispute, Tito's attempt to mediate between Turkey and Greece failed.

The Balkan Pact included Yugoslavia into the Western defence system, which strengthened the country's security. It also raised problems for Tito and the League of Communists of Yugoslavia and brought Yugoslavia and Greece together. The pact indirectly heightened international and ideological conflicts.

== See also ==
- Balkan Pact (1934)
- Baghdad Pact
- Informbiro period
- Greece–Turkey relations
- Greece–Yugoslavia relations
- Turkey–Yugoslavia relations
- Hellenic Army
- Turkish Armed Forces
- Yugoslav People's Army
- Individual Partnership Action Plan
- Major non-NATO ally
- Western Union (alliance)

== Sources ==
- David R. Stone, "The Balkan Pact and American Policy, 1950-1955," East European Quarterly 28.3 (September 1994), pp. 393–407.
