= Intermarium =

Proposed country during World War I

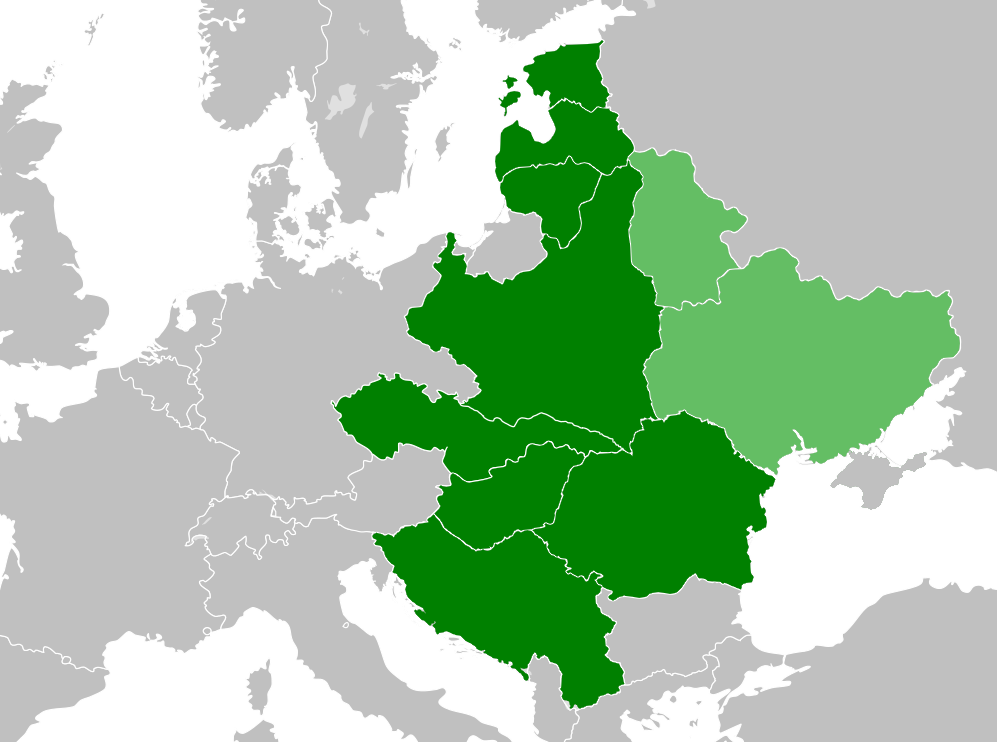
Józef Piłsudski's post-WWI Intermarium concept ranging from the Baltic Sea in the north to the Adriatic and Black Seas in the south. In light green: eastern parts of Ukrainian and Belarusian lands incorporated into the Soviet Union in 1922

Intermarium (Polish: Międzymorze, Polish pronunciation: [mʲɛnd͡zɨˈmɔʐɛ]) was a post-WWI geopolitical plan conceived by Józef Piłsudski to unite former Polish–Lithuanian Commonwealth lands within a single polity. The plan went through several iterations, some of which anticipated the inclusion of neighbouring states. The proposed multinational polity would have incorporated territories lying between the Baltic, Black, and Adriatic Seas. The Polish name Międzymorze (from między, "between"; and morze, "sea"), meaning "Between-Seas", was rendered into Latin as Intermarium.

Prospectively a federation of Central and Eastern European countries, the post-World War I Intermarium plan pursued by Piłsudski sought to recruit to the proposed federation the Baltic states (Lithuania, Latvia, Estonia), Finland, Belarus, Ukraine, Hungary, Romania, Yugoslavia, and Czechoslovakia.

The proposed federation was meant to emulate the Polish–Lithuanian Commonwealth, stretching from the Baltic Sea to the Black Sea, that, from 1569 (the Union of Lublin) to the end of the 18th century, had united the Kingdom of Poland and the Grand Duchy of Lithuania. Intermarium complemented Piłsudski's other geopolitical vision, Prometheism, whose goal was the dismemberment of the Russian Empire and that Empire's divestment of its territorial acquisitions.

Intermarium was perceived by some Lithuanians as a threat to their newly established independence, and by some Ukrainians as a threat to their aspirations for independence. While France backed the proposal, it was opposed by the Soviet Union and by most other Western powers. Within two decades of the failure of Piłsudski's grand scheme, all the countries that he had viewed as candidates for membership in the Intermarium federation had fallen to the Soviet Union or to Nazi Germany, except for Finland (which suffered some territorial losses in the 1939–40 Winter War with the Soviet Union).

== Precedents ==
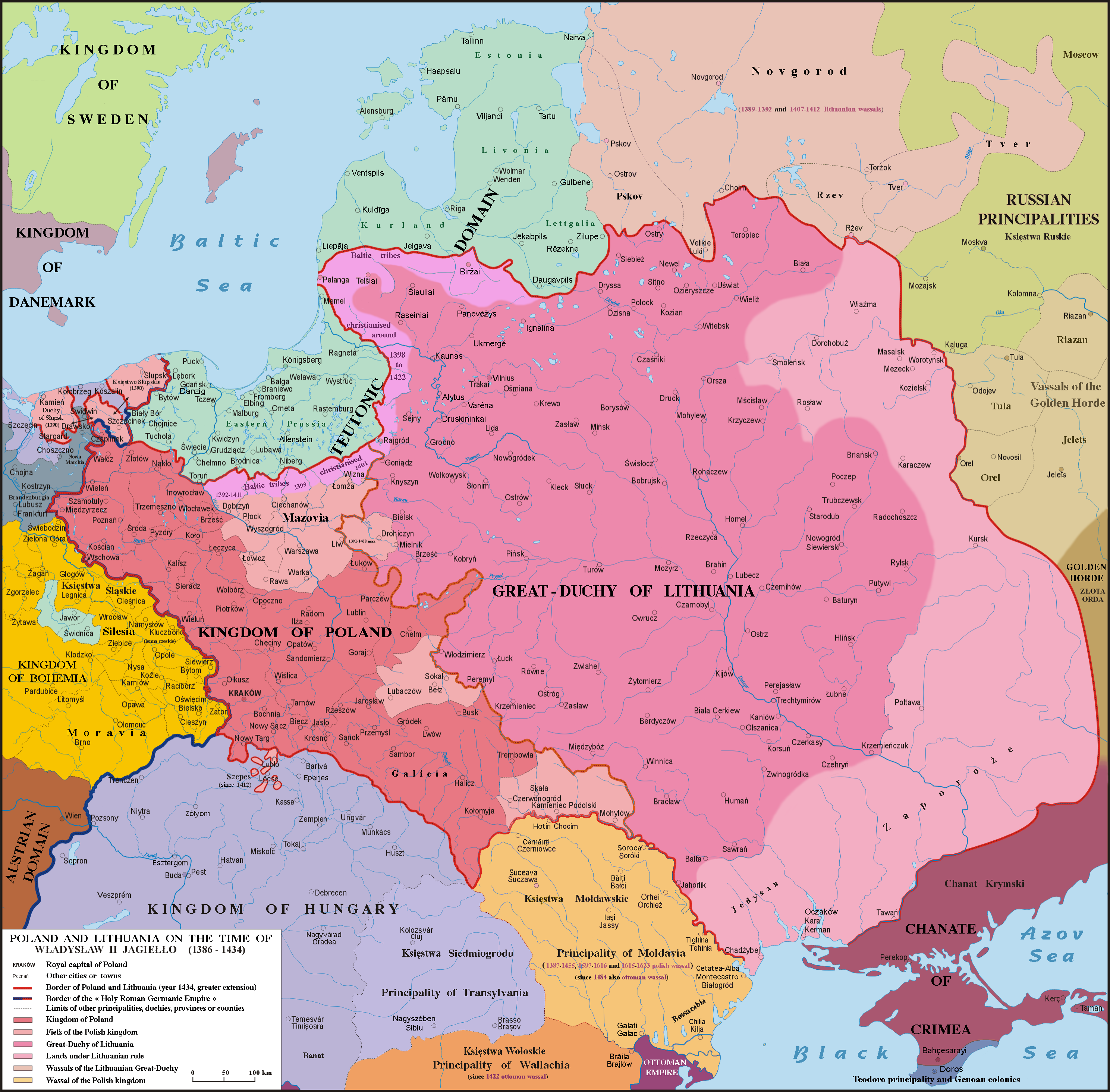
The Polish–Lithuanian union at its greatest extent, 1386–1434

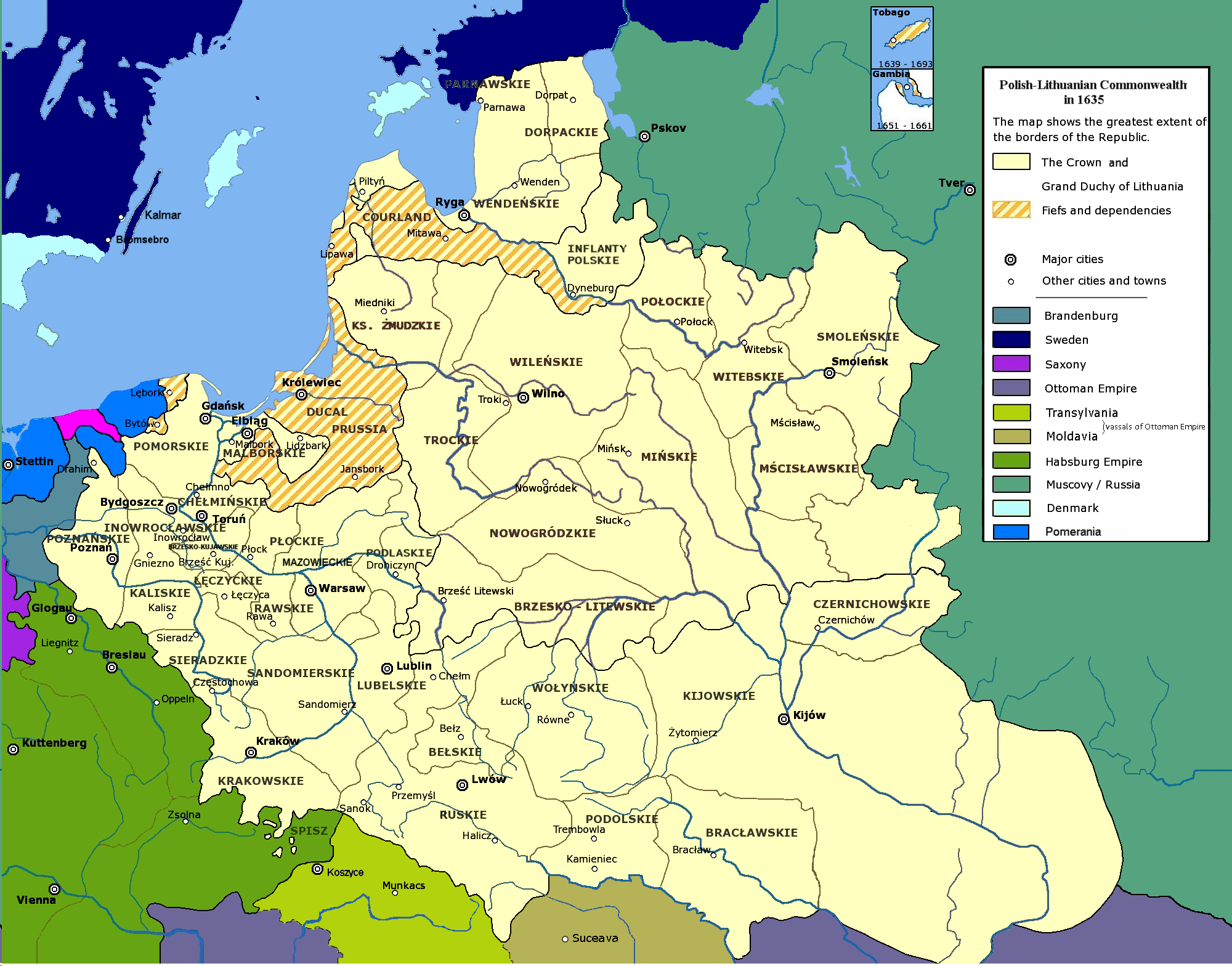
The Polish–Lithuanian Commonwealth at its greatest extent, 1635

=== Commonwealth ===
A Polish–Lithuanian union and military alliance had come about as a mutual response to common threats posed by the Teutonic Order, the Golden Horde, and the Grand Duchy of Moscow. The alliance was first established in 1385 by the Union of Krewo, solemnized by the marriage of Poland's Queen Jadwiga and Lithuania's Grand Duke Jogaila of the Gediminid dynasty, who became King Władysław II Jagiełło of Poland.

A longer-lasting federation subsequently came about in 1569 in the form of the Polish–Lithuanian Commonwealth, an arrangement that lasted until 1795, i.e., until the Third Partition of the Poland.

The Polish–Lithuanian alliance thus lasted a total of 410 years, and constituted at times the largest state in Europe.

Under the Commonwealth, proposals were advanced to establish expanded, Polish–Lithuanian-Muscovite or Polish–Lithuanian–Ruthenian Commonwealths. Though the Commonwealth temporarily controlled parts of Russia and governed much of Ruthenia for centuries, these proposals were never implemented at a constitutional level.

=== Adam Czartoryski's plan ===
Between the November and January Uprisings, in the period between 1832 and 1861, the idea of resurrecting an updated Polish–Lithuanian Commonwealth was advocated by Prince Adam Jerzy Czartoryski, residing in exile at the Hôtel Lambert in Paris.

In his youth, Czartoryski had fought against Russia in the Polish–Russian War of 1792; he would have done so again in the Kościuszko Uprising of 1794 had he not been arrested at Brussels on his way back to Poland. Subsequently, in 1795, he and his younger brother had been commanded to enter the Imperial Russian Army, and Catherine the Great had been so favourably impressed with them that she had restored to them part of their confiscated estates. Adam Czartoryski subsequently served the Russian emperors Paul and Alexander I as a diplomat and foreign minister, establishing an anti-French coalition during the Napoleonic Wars. Czartoryski, one of the leaders of the Polish November 1830 Uprising, had been sentenced to death after its suppression by Russia, but was eventually allowed to go into exile in France.

Coat of arms for a proposed Polish–Lithuanian–Ruthenian Commonwealth during the January 1863 Uprising: Polish White Eagle, Lithuanian Pagaunė, and Ruthenian Archangel Michael

In Paris the "visionary" statesman and former friend, confidant, and de facto foreign minister of Alexander I acted as the "uncrowned king and unacknowledged foreign minister" of a nonexistent Poland.

In his book, Essai sur la diplomatie (Essay on Diplomacy), completed in 1827 but published only in 1830, Czartoryski observed that, "Having extended her sway south and west, and being by the nature of things unreachable from the east and north, Russia becomes a source of constant threat to Europe." He argued that Russia would have done better cultivating "friends rather than slaves". He also identified a future threat from Prussia and urged the incorporation of East Prussia into a resurrected Poland.

Czartoryski's diplomatic efforts anticipated Piłsudski's Prometheist project in linking efforts for Polish independence with similar movements of other subjugated nations in Europe, as far east as the Caucasus Mountains, most notably in Georgia.

Czartoryski aspired above all to reconstitute—with French, British, and Ottoman support—a sort of "pan-Slavic" Polish–Lithuanian Commonwealth federated with the Czechs, Slovaks, Hungarians, Romanians, and all the South Slavs of the future Yugoslavia. Poland, in his concept, could have mediated the conflicts between Hungary and the Slavs, and between Hungary and Romania. The plan seemed achievable during the period of national revolutions in 1848–49 but foundered on lack of western support, on Hungarian intransigence toward the Czechs, Slovaks, and Romanians, and on the rise of German nationalism.

Marian Kamil Dziewanowski writes that "the Prince's endeavour constitutes a [vital] link [between] the 16th-century Jagiellon [federative prototype] and Józef Piłsudski's federative-Prometheist program [that was to follow after World War I]."

== Józef Piłsudski's Międzymorze ==
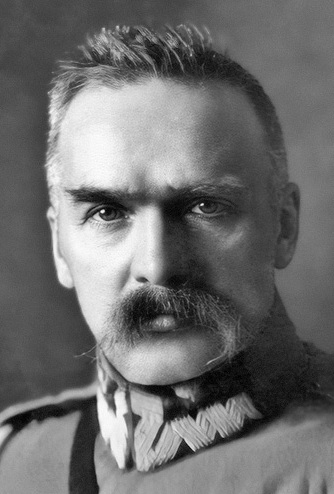
Józef Piłsudski

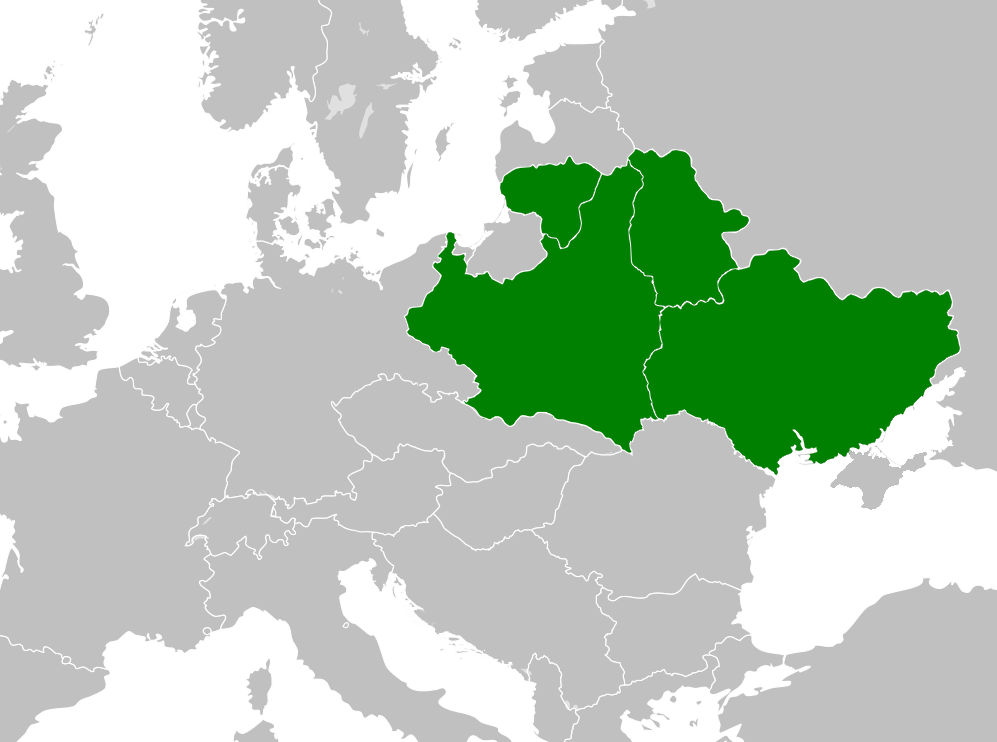
Piłsudski's initial plan for Intermarium: a resurrected Polish–Lithuanian Commonwealth

Józef Piłsudski's strategic goal was to resurrect an updated, democratic form of the Polish–Lithuanian Commonwealth, while working for the disintegration of the Russian Empire, and later the Soviet Union, into its ethnic constituents. (The latter was his Prometheist project.) Piłsudski saw an Intermarium federation as a counterweight to Russian and German imperialism.

According to Dziewanowski, the plan was never expressed in systematic fashion but instead relied on Piłsudski's pragmatic instincts. According to British scholar George Sanford, about the time of the Polish–Soviet War of 1920 Piłsudski recognised that the plan was not feasible.

=== Opposition ===
Piłsudski's plan faced opposition from virtually all quarters. The Soviets, whose sphere of influence was directly threatened, worked to thwart the Intermarium agenda. The Allied Powers assumed that Bolshevism was only a temporary threat and did not want to see their important (from the balance-of-power viewpoint) traditional ally, Russia, weakened. They resented Piłsudski's refusal to aid their White allies, viewed Piłsudski with suspicion, saw his plans as unrealistic, and urged Poland to confine itself to areas of clear-cut Polish ethnicity. The Lithuanians, who had re-established their independence in 1918, were unwilling to join; the Ukrainians, similarly seeking independence, likewise feared that Poland might again subjugate them; and the Belarusians, though nearly not as interested in independence as Ukraine, were still fearful of Polish domination. The chances for Piłsudski's scheme were not enhanced by a series of post-World War I wars and border conflicts between Poland and its neighbors in disputed territories—the Polish–Soviet War, the Polish–Lithuanian War, the Polish–Ukrainian War, and border conflicts between Poland and Czechoslovakia.

Piłsudski's concept was opposed within Poland itself, where National Democracy leader Roman Dmowski argued for an ethnically homogeneous Poland in which minorities would be Polonised. Many Polish politicians, including Dmowski, opposed the idea of a multiethnic federation, preferring instead to work for a unitary Polish nation state. Sanford has described Piłsudski's policies after his resumption of power in 1926 as similarly focusing on the Polonisation of the country's Eastern Slavic minorities and on the centralisation of power.

While some scholars accept at face value the democratic principles claimed by Piłsudski for his federative plan, others view such claims with skepticism, pointing out a coup d'état in 1926 when Piłsudski assumed nearly dictatorial powers. In particular, his project is viewed unfavourably by most Ukrainian historians, with Oleksandr Derhachov arguing that the federation would have created a greater Poland in which the interests of non-Poles, especially Ukrainians, would have received short shrift.

Some historians hold that Piłsudski, who argued that "There can be no independent Poland without an independent Ukraine", may have been more interested in splitting Ukraine from Russia than in assuring Ukrainians' welfare. He did not hesitate to use military force to expand Poland's borders to Galicia and Volhynia, crushing a Ukrainian attempt at self-determination in disputed territories east of the Bug River which contained a substantial Polish presence (a Polish majority mainly in cities such as Lwów, surrounded by a rural Ukrainian majority).

Speaking of Poland's future frontiers, Piłsudski said: "All that we can gain in the west depends on the Entente—on the extent to which it may wish to squeeze Germany", while in the east "there are doors that open and close, and it depends on who forces them open and how far". In the eastern chaos, the Polish forces set out to expand as far as feasible. On the other hand, Poland had no interest in joining the western intervention in the Russian Civil War or in conquering Russia itself.

=== Failure ===
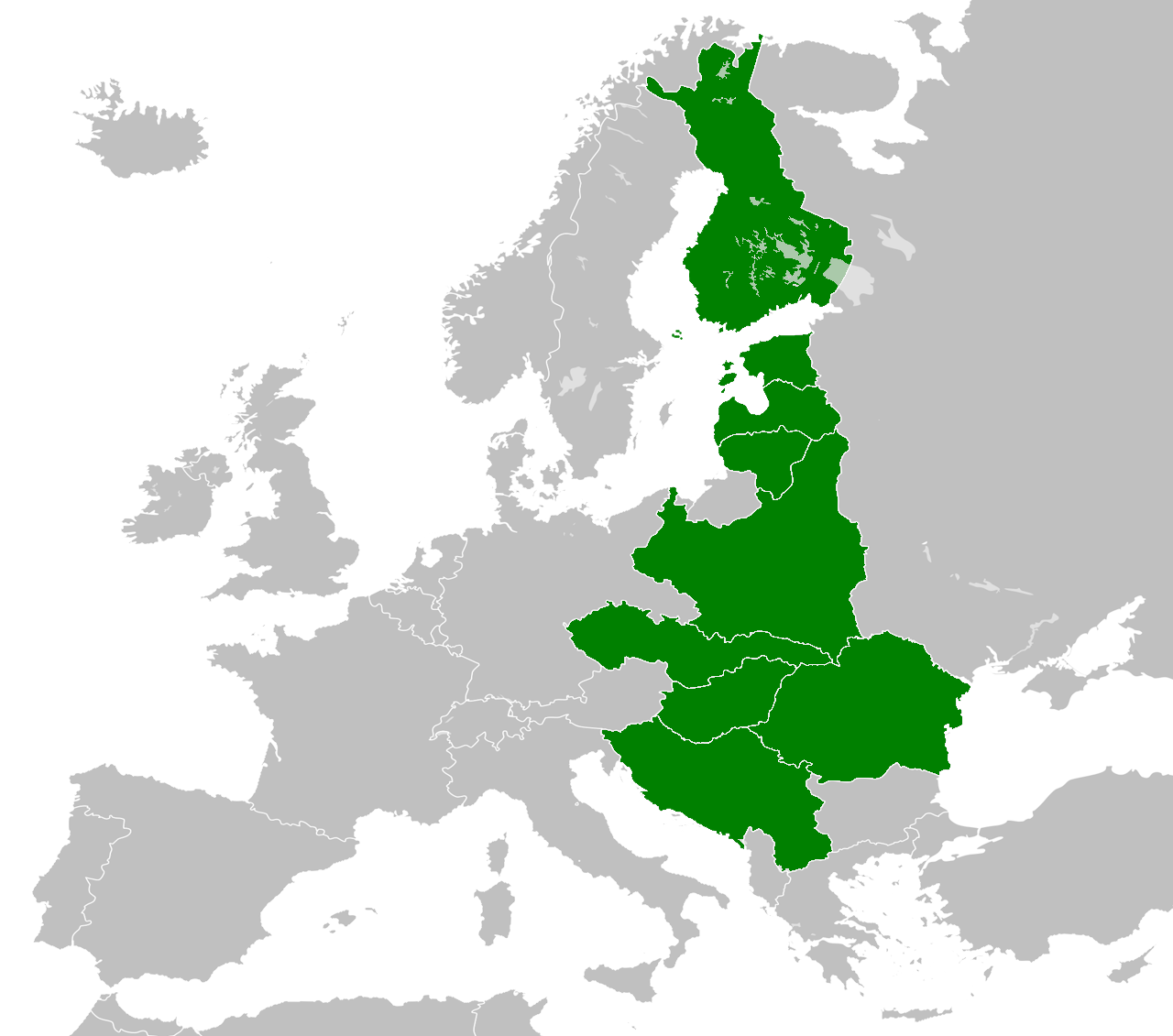
Piłsudski's revised Intermarium plan

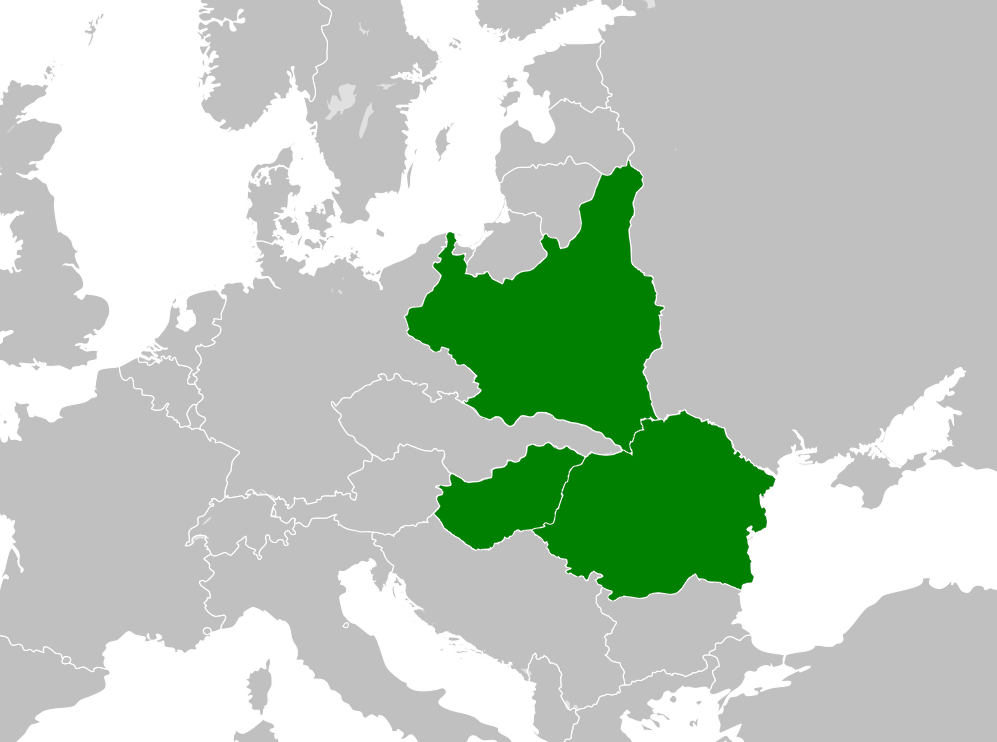
Józef Beck's plan for "Third Europe", an alliance of Poland, Romania, and Hungary

In the aftermath of the Polish–Soviet War (1919–1921), and the establishment of the Ukrainian SSR, Piłsudski's concept of a federation of Central and Eastern European countries, based on a Polish-Ukrainian axis, lost any chance of realisation.

Piłsudski next contemplated a federation or alliance with the Baltic and Balkan states. This plan envisioned a Central European union including Poland, Czechoslovakia, Hungary, Finland, the Baltic states, Scandinavia, Italy, Romania, Bulgaria, Yugoslavia, and Greece—thus stretching not only west-east from the Baltic to the Black Sea, but north-south from the Arctic Ocean to the Mediterranean Sea. This project also failed: Poland was distrusted by Czechoslovakia and Lithuania; and while it had relatively good relations with the other countries, they had tensions with their neighbors, making it virtually impossible to create in Central Europe a large block of countries that all had good relations with each other. In the end, in place of a large federation, only a Polish–Romanian alliance was established, beginning in 1921. In comparison, Czechoslovakia had more success with its Little Entente (1920–1938) with Romania and Yugoslavia, supported by France.

Piłsudski died in 1935. A later, much reduced version of his concept was attempted by interwar Polish Foreign Minister Józef Beck, a protégé of Piłsudski. His proposal, during the late 1930s, of a "Third Europe"—an alliance of Poland, Romania, and Hungary—gained little ground before World War II supervened. Beck's Third Europe concept failed to achieve any traction because Germany was the world's second largest economy and all of eastern Europe was dominated economically by the Reich. For economic reasons, the tendency in eastern Europe was to follow the lead of Berlin rather than Warsaw.

Disregarding the 1932 Polish–Soviet Non-Aggression Pact, the Soviet Union allied itself with Nazi Germany to divide Central and Eastern Europe between them. According to some historians, it was the failure to create a strong counterweight to Germany and the Soviet Union, as proposed by Piłsudski, that doomed Intermarium's prospective member countries to their fates in World War II.

== World War II and 20th century ==
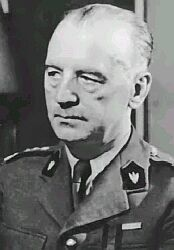
Władysław Sikorski

The concept of a "Central [and Eastern] European Union"—a triangular geopolitical entity anchored in the Baltic, Black, and Adriatic or Aegean Seas—was revived during World War II in Władysław Sikorski's Polish Government-in-Exile. This concept was backed by the British Foreign Office led by British Foreign Minister Anthony Eden.

A first step toward its implementation—1942 discussions among the Greek, Yugoslav, Polish, and Czechoslovak governments-in-exile regarding prospective Greek–Yugoslav and Polish–Czechoslovak federations (with the eventual aim of Hungarian, Romanian, Bulgarian, and Albanian incorporation)—ultimately foundered on Soviet opposition, which led to Czech hesitation and Allied indifference or hostility.

A declaration by the Polish Underground State in that period called for the creation of a Central and Eastern European federal union undominated by any one state.

== 21st century ==
Map of the Three Seas Initiative

In modern use, the Intermarium region comprises a group of geographically contiguous Central and Eastern European countries that share a common historical, social, and cultural identity. Many were socialist buffer republics, either Soviet republics or otherwise subordinate to the USSR. As a region, they form a land buffer from the Baltic to the Black Sea that could balance future Russian influence in Europe.

On 12 May 2011, the Visegrád Group countries (The Republic of Poland, the Czech Republic, the Slovak Republic, and Hungary) announced the formation of a Visegrád Battlegroup under Polish command. The battlegroup was in place by 2016 as an EU force, not part of the NATO command. In addition, starting in 2013, the four countries were to begin joint military exercises under the auspices of the NATO Response Force. Some scholars saw this as a first step toward close Central European regional cooperation.

On 6 August 2015, Polish President Andrzej Duda, in his inaugural address, announced plans to build a regional alliance of Central European states, modeled on the Intermarium concept. In 2016 the Three Seas Initiative held an initial summit meeting in Dubrovnik, Croatia. The Three Seas Initiative has 13 member states along a north–south axis from the Baltic Sea to the Adriatic Sea and the Black Sea: Estonia, Latvia, Lithuania, Poland, Czechia, Slovakia, Austria, Hungary, Slovenia, Croatia, Romania, Bulgaria, and Greece.

The term has gained currency in the context of Russia's invasion of Ukraine, as humanitarian and military aid has been offered to Ukraine, increasing its defence resources (GDP). Support for Ukraine has also included many countries that have condemned Russia's actions and imposed sanctions, including Estonia, Hungary, Latvia, Lithuania, Poland, Romania, and Slovakia. Other assistance includes accelerated and expanded energy projects; communications projects; and various NATO defence projects, including NATO's Enhanced Forward Presence.

=== Intermarium Region ===
The term "Intermarium Region" refers to close cooperation within the European Union. The creation of the Eastern Partnership, the Bucharest Nine, the Visegrád Group, and later the Three Seas Initiative created a regional dialogue on issues affecting the member states. The Lublin Triangle was established to strengthen mutual military, cultural, economic, and political cooperation and to support Ukraine's integration into the European Union and NATO.

The Intermarium region, together with the countries of the European Union, has accelerated energy, communications, and defence projects and will participate in the reconstruction of Ukraine, which has become an official candidate for membership in the European Union. This will enable these countries to form a future buffer from the Baltic to the Black Sea, balancing Russian imperial influence in Europe. The American geopolitician George Friedman refers to the Intermarium region in his works and speeches.

== See also ==
- Balkan Pact (1934)
- Balkan Pact (1953)
- Baltic Entente
- Border states (Eastern Europe)
- British–Polish–Ukrainian trilateral pact
- Bucharest Nine
- Cordon sanitaire (international relations)
- Collegium Intermarium
- Czech Corridor
- Georgian–Polish alliance
- Giedroyc Doctrine
- Hellenoturkism
- Historic recurrence
- Intermediate Region
- Kresy
- Limitrophe states
- List of proposed state mergers
- Lithuanian–Polish–Ukrainian Brigade
- Lublin Triangle
- Mitteleuropa
- Polish–Lithuanian–Ruthenian Commonwealth
- Polish–Romanian alliance
- Polish–Ukrainian alliance
- Prometheism
- Reunavaltiopolitiikka, a Finnish policy of the era aiming to ally with countries of the region.
- Romanian Bridgehead
- Rome Protocols
- Third Europe
- Three Seas Initiative
- Union of Bulgaria and Romania
- Union of Hungary and Romania
- Visegrád Group
- Warsaw Accord

== Bibliography ==
- Janusz Cisek, Kilka uwag o myśli federacyjnej Józefa Piłsudskiego, Międzymorze – Polska i kraje Europy środkowo-wschodniej XIX–XX wiek (Some Remarks on Józef Piłsudski's Federationist Thought, Międzymorze – Poland and the East-Central European Countries in the 19th–20th Centuries), Warsaw, 1995.
- Marek Jan Chodakiewicz, Intermarium: The Land between the Black and Baltic Seas (Transaction Publishers) New Brunswick, NJ. 2012.
- Marian Kamil Dziewanowski, "Polski pionier zjednoczonej Europy" ("A Polish Pioneer of a United Europe"), Gwiazda Polarna (Pole Star), vol. 96, no 19 (September 17, 2005), pp. 10–11.
- M.K. Dziewanowski, Czartoryski and His Essai sur la diplomatie, 1971, ASIN B0072XRK6.
- M.K. Dziewanowski, Joseph Pilsudski: a European Federalist, 1918–1922, Stanford, Hoover Institution, 1979.
- Peter Jordan, Central Union of Europe, introduction by Ernest Minor Patterson, Ph.D., President, The American Academy of Political and Social Science, New York, Robert M. McBride & Company, 1944.
- Jonathan Levy, The Intermarium: Madison, Wilson, and East Central European Federalism, ISBN 1-58112-369-8, 2006
- Sławomir Łukasiewicz, Trzecia Europa: Polska myśl federalistyczna w Stanach Zjednoczonych, 1940–1971 (Third Europe: Polish Federalist Thought in the United States, 1940–1971), Warsaw, Institute for National Remembrance (Instytut Pamięci Narodowej), 2010, ISBN 978-83-7629-137-6.
- Anna Mazurkiewicz (University of Gdańsk), review of Sławomir Łukasiewicz, Trzecia Europa: Polska myśl federalistyczna w Stanach Zjednoczonych, 1940–1971, in Polish American Studies: A Journal of Polish American History and Culture, Published by the Polish American Historical Association, vol. LXVIII, no. 1 (Spring 2011), ISSN 0032-2806, pp. 77–81.
- Piotr Okulewicz, Koncepcja "miedzymorza" w myśli i praktyce politycznej obozu Józefa Piłsudskiego w latach 1918–1926 (The Concept of Międzymorze in the Political Thought and Practice of Józef Piłsudski's Camp in the Years 1918–1926), Poznań, 2001, ISBN 83-7177-060-X.
- Antoni Plutynski, We Are 115 Millions, with a foreword by Douglas Reed, London, Eyre & Spottiswoode, 1944.
- David J. Smith, Artis Pabriks, Aldis Purs, Thomas Lane, The Baltic States: Estonia, Latvia and Lithuania, Routledge (UK), 2002, ISBN 0-415-28580-1 Google Print, p. 30 (also available here).
