= Iwo Cyprian Pogonowski =

Polish-born polymath and inventor

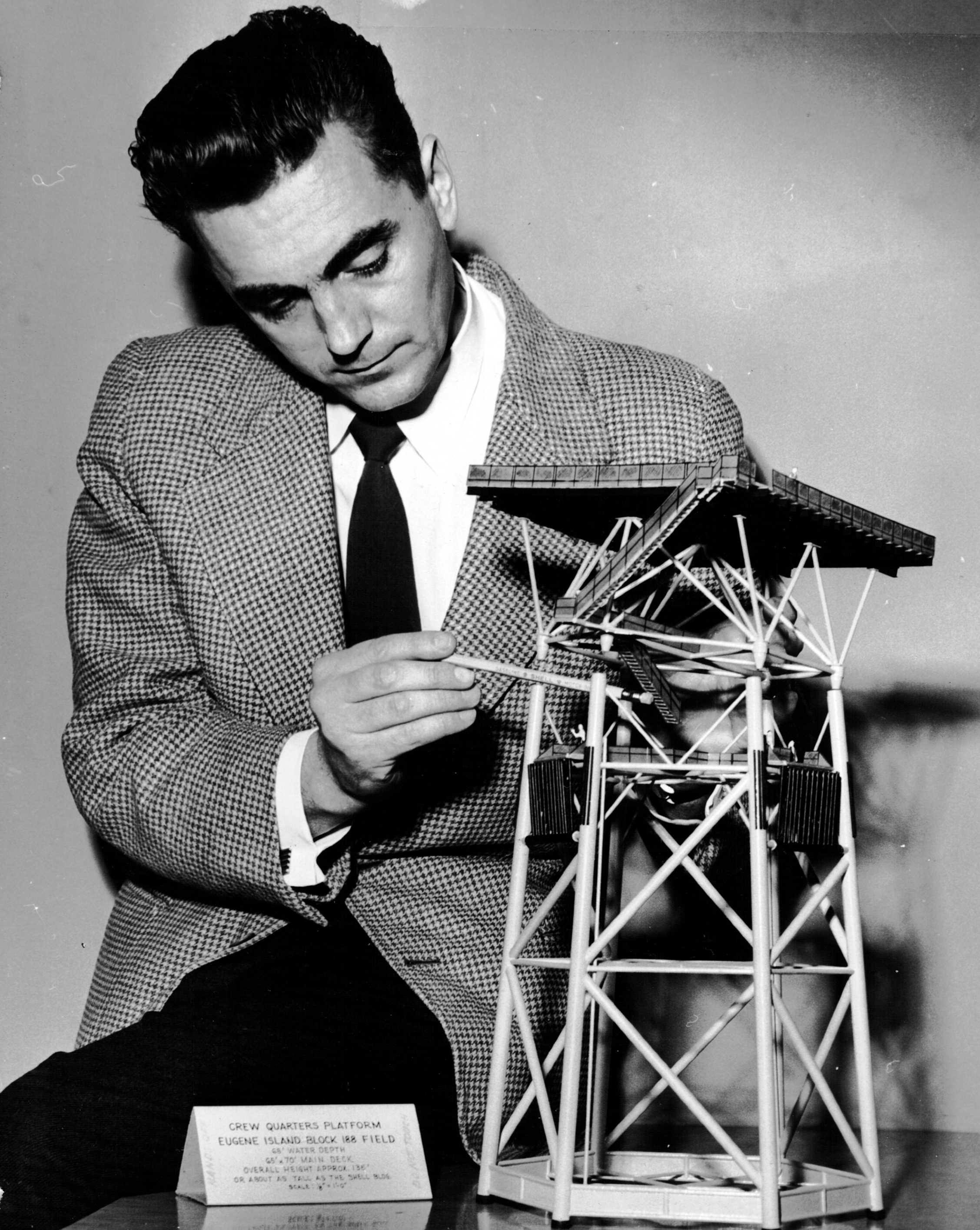
- Iwo Pogonowski with model for his design of a hexagonal-base oil platform
- Born: September 3, 1921; Lwów
- Died: July 21, 2016 (aged 94)
- Burial place: Rakowicki Cemetery, Kraków
- Citizenship: Poland / USA

Iwo Cyprian Pogonowski (3 September 1921 – 21 July 2016) was a Polish-born polymath and inventor with 50 patents to his credit. He was a civil and industrial engineer by profession, educated in Poland, Belgium, and the United States.

He was also a writer on Polish and European history, author of historical atlases, and a lexicographer.

== Life ==
Pogonowski was born in Lwów, Poland. After the invasion of Poland in World War II, in December 1939 Pogonowski, aged 18, left Warsaw with the intent of joining the Polish Armed Forces in the West. He was arrested in Dukla by the German authorities on suspicion of aiming to join the resistance. He was moved between prisons and camps for five years thereafter. Interned at the Krosno, Jasło, and Tarnów prisons among others, he was sent with 500 prisoners to Auschwitz, and from there, several months later, to Oranienburg-Sachsenhausen. He survived the camps and was liberated on 2 May 1945. Pogonowski summarized his experiences at the Nazi concentration camps in a three-page article popularized in Richard C. Lukas' Out of the Inferno. In 1954 he graduated in Civil Engineering at the Catholic University: Institute Superieur de Commerce in Antwerp. He moved to the United States and in the following years worked as a project engineer in the oil industry.

== Historian and lexicographer ==
Pogonowski published an illustrated history of Poland (2000), historical atlases and a work on Polish heraldry (2002).

Pogonowski's Jews in Poland was praised by M. K. Dziewanowski, who called the book a "pioneering attempt [to] 'encompass' Jews within the Polish discourse, a rarity in American scholarship and in the discourse about Jews." He was criticized by Piotr Wróbel and Joanna Michlic, who believes him to represent the ethnonationalist trend in historiography.

Pogonowski compiled several Polish–English, English–Polish dictionaries which have appeared since 1981, including his Unabridged Polish–English Dictionary (3 volumes, New York, Hippocrene Books, 1997; some 100,000 entries) and the Polish-English, English–Polish Standard Dictionary (1985, reprinted 1993, 1994 and 1997).

His journalistic work includes broadcasts for the Polish religious radio station Radio Maryja and columns for its sister publication, Nasz Dziennik (Our Daily). He has also written columns in the Polish-American biweekly, Gwiazda Polarna.

== Publications ==
=== Dictionaries ===
- Practical Polish–English Dictionary, Hippocrene Books, 1981.
- Polish–English, English–Polish Standard Dictionary, Hippocrene Books, 1985.
- Compact Polish–English Dictionary, Hippocrene Books, 1985.
- Polish Phrasebook and Dictionary: Complete Phonetics for English Speakers, 103 pp., 1991.
- Unabridged Polish–English Dictionary, 3 volumes, New York, Hippocrene Books, 1997.

=== History ===
- Poland: A Historical Atlas, revised edition, New York, Hippocrene Books, 1989.
- The Jews in Poland: A Documentary History; the Rise of [the] Jews as a Nation from Congressus Judaicus in Poland to the Knesset in Israel, New York, Hippocrene Books, 1993.
- Świat po amerykańsku, Fundacja 'Nasza Przyszłość', 2004.
- Heraldyka – Heraldry, CD-ROM, published by Juliusz Ostrowski, 2002.
- Poland: An Illustrated History, Hippocrene Books, 2000 (recommended by Norman Davies and Zbigniew Brzeziński).
- Jews in Poland: A Documentary History, New York, Hippocrene Books, 1998.
- Historyczny Atlas Polski (A Historical Atlas of Poland), Wydawnictwo Baran i Suszczyński, 1995.
- Poland: A Historical Atlas, New York, Hippocrene Books, 1987.
- Hegemonia – On US Foreign Policy, Poznań, WERS, 2008.
- The First Democracy in Modern Europe: Million Free Citizens in Poland during the Renaissance, 2010 (E-Book).

== See also ==
- List of lexicographers
- List of Poles
