= Baltic Entente =

1934 Baltic cooperation organization

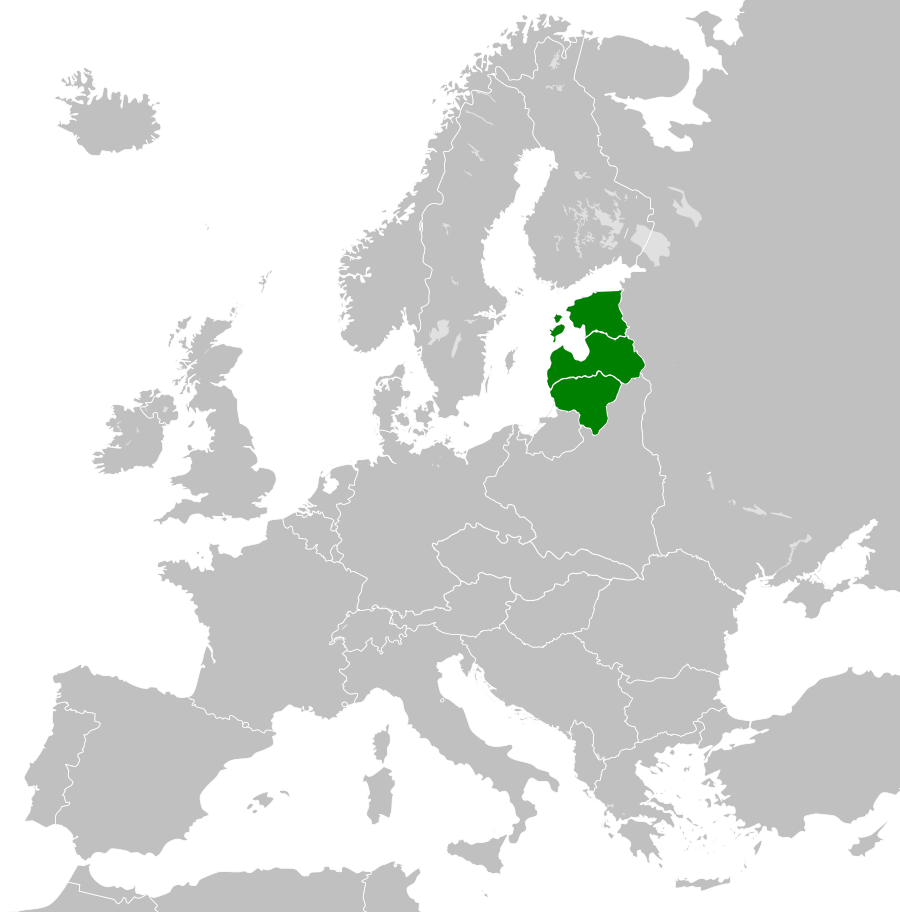
The participants of the Baltic Entente in Europe

The Baltic Entente was based on Treaty of Good-Understanding and Co-operation signed between Lithuania, Latvia, and Estonia on 12 September 1934 in Geneva. The main objective of the agreement was joint action in foreign policy. It also included commitments to support one another politically and to give diplomatic support in international communication. The endeavour was ultimately unsuccessful, as the combined strength of the three nations and their statements of neutrality were insubstantial in the face of the massive armies of Poland, Germany and the Soviet Union.

The plans for division of control of European lands located between the two powers laid out in the August 1939 Nazi-Soviet Pact assigned the Baltic countries into Soviet "sphere of influence". In June 1940 all three countries were invaded and occupied by the Stalinist Soviet Union, and formally annexed into the USSR in August 1940.

== Formation ==
The idea of setting up a Baltic Union started gaining momentum between 1914 and 1918 and became a direct consequence of people's hopes for independence. The concept of uniting Estonia, Latvia, and Lithuania originated in the minds of the numerous refugees, who had no other choice than to flee to the west to escape the tyranny at home. They pooled their efforts in the struggle to achieve freedom and create nationhood. Their efforts became more evident after the end of World War I in 1918.

Thanks to the victory of Entente in World War I and the relative international weakening of both Germany and Russia, it became possible for the Baltic states to turn theoretical ideas into practice and to establish themselves politically in the international arena. All three Baltic countries managed to secure their independence by signing individual peace treaties with Russia in 1920. It was a big step in the way of diplomatic co-operation between the Baltic states and allowed each nation to receive recognition of their sovereignty from the other states. Acceptance of the Baltic states as members of the League of Nations in September 1921 meant that Latvian, Estonian and Lithuanian security seemed endorsed. The major outcome of World War I determined a new international order in Europe. Under the new conditions, the issue of solidifying independence for the Baltic States was of paramount importance.

However, it was not until 1934 that establishing the union was possible. Lithuania remained reluctant to the idea because its international political strategy contradicted those of Latvia and Estonia. While Latvia and Estonia saw Germany and the Soviet Union as the primary dangers, Lithuania sought to ally with those states. However, in 1934, the Soviet–Polish Non-Aggression Pact and the German–Polish Non-Aggression Pact both resulted in the collapse of the Lithuanian foreign policy and forced a change of position.

== Purpose ==
At the heart of the establishment of the Entente was the desire of its members to prolong and solidify the peace. The reasons for establishment of the Entente are well expressed in the preamble to the treaty signed on September 12, 1934: "Firmly resolved to contribute to the maintenance and guarantee of the peace, and to coordinate their external policy within the spirit of the principles of the Pact of the League of Nations, the Baltic States have resolved to conclude a treaty".

== Organisation ==
At the heart of the organisation was a co-ordinating agency since the plans of the Baltic Entente required a unified foreign policy. The responsibility of the agency was stipulated in the Article 2 of the treaty: "For the purpose stated in the first Article, the contracting parties have elected to institute periodic conferences of the Foreign Ministers of the three countries".

== Reasons for failure ==
Without the "internal weaknesses" and a conflict with Poland, the Baltic Entente "could have been a significant entity".

However, one of the first incidents that led to the demise of the union was the 1938 Polish-Lithuanian crisis, resulting from the death of a Polish soldier at the Lithuanian border. The Polish government used the incident as leverage to force Lithuania back into diplomatic contact with Poland.

Moreover, the Entente had never materialized into a real political force because it maintained its miscalculated policy of maintaining its neutrality, even with World War II imminent.

As well, it had a vague definition of what was considered to be a threat and who was the mutual enemy. From the very day of its establishment, the Entente lacked a unified conception of what it considered to be a threat and what its enemies were. The ambiguity led to a lack of common goals among its members and brought the feeling that co-operation was not beneficial for mutual advantage.

As well, there was a lack of ability to create mutual security. Since the Entente did not become a military alliance, its members could not rely on the organization to provide for their security.

Lack of an economic foundation was another factor. The three countries were not integrated into a mutually-beneficial economic domain, which took its toll and significantly weakened the alliance. Despite having similar economic structures, all three were forced to compete, rather than cooperate, with one another.

Finally, there was the failure to establish the feeling of unity. Differences in the nations' destinies, mentalities and cultures set precedents for misunderstandings. Since the Baltic nations felt no common historical identity, the Entente intensified those sentiments and made them diverge even more.

== See also ==
- Baltic Assembly
- Międzymorze
- Warsaw Accord
