= Third Europe =

Proposed interbellum alliance between Poland, Romania, and Hungary

- Trzecia Europa (Polish); A Treia Europa (Romanian); Harmadik Európa (Hungarian)
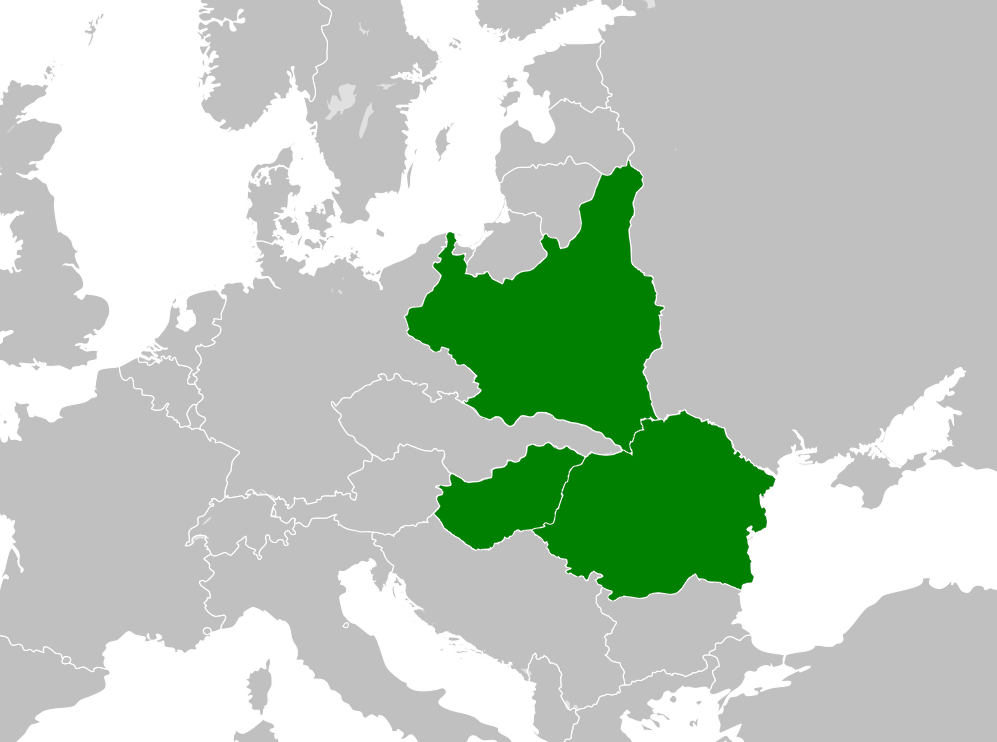
- Formation: N/A
- Type: Proposed alliance
- Legal status: Not accepted
- Purpose: Stop expansion of Nazi Germany and the Soviet Union
- Region served: Eastern Europe
- Official language: Polish, Romanian, and Hungarian
- Key people: Józef Beck

A "Third Europe" was the 1938 proposal of an alliance between the Second Polish Republic, the Kingdom of Romania, and the Kingdom of Hungary. It was proposed by Polish foreign minister Józef Beck, as a mutual defense pact against both Nazi Germany and the Soviet Union.

== History ==
=== Intermarium ===
After the end of the First World War, Polish Chief of State Józef Piłsudski proposed the Intermarium (lit. Between Seas), a country that would include the Baltic states, Poland, Czechoslovakia, Belarus, Ukraine, Romania, Hungary, and Yugoslavia. The country was meant to be a Federation that emulated the former Polish-Lithuanian Commonwealth, which had dissolved in 1795. Pilsudki also hoped that the plan could stop the aggression of the newly formed Russian Soviet Federative Socialist Republic by keeping it out of Lithuania, Belarus, and Ukraine.

Pilsudski's next proposal was without Ukraine or Belarus, but with the addition of Finland, Bulgaria, and Greece. This Intermarium would not only stretch from the Baltic to the Black Seas, but also from the Arctic Ocean to the Mediterranean Sea. This plan also failed, as Poland was distrusted by Czechoslovakia and Lithuania. While Poland had good relations with some other countries, it had tensions with its neighbors rendering such a union impossible. Only a Polish-Romanian alliance emerged from the proposal, being established in 1921. In 1920, along with Yugoslavia and Romania, Czechoslovakia formed the Little Entente, which was supported by France.

=== Beck's proposal ===
Following Pilsudski's death in 1935, Polish Foreign Minister Józef Beck decided to create a plan for his own union between nations. He called his plan "Third Europe," an alliance between Poland, Romania, and Hungary. Beck hoped that the plan would prevent aggression by both Nazi Germany and the Soviet Union. Beck also hoped that the plan could allow him to become closer with the United Kingdom, as well as establish cooperation with Japan and Turkey, among other powers. The concept became very prominent in the tense prewar years of 1937–1939. As observed by Marek Kornat, the principle of the Third Europe plan would be hard to reconstruct, as it was never implemented, and as Beck never gave an in-depth explanation of its principles.

The proposal gained little traction before the onset of the Second World War due to the influence of Nazi Germany. Germany was the world's second largest economy (behind the United States) and the third most populous in Europe (behind the UK and France). Germany had much more influence over Eastern Europe than either of the latter two powers due to its proximity to the region. Countries in Eastern Europe felt more inclined to follow Berlin's lead rather than Warsaw.

== Reactions ==
=== Poland ===
By 1939, the Polish government became divided about what to do amidst the Danzig Crisis, fearing an invasion by Nazi Germany. Beck said he was willing to accept a joint German–Polish condominium over Danzig (now Gdańsk) in return German support of the Third Europe concept. Many Europeans, however, became distrustful the Sanacja regime, and thus did not approve of Beck's proposal. Beck's fears would become realized with both the German and Soviet invasions of Poland, beginning the Second World War.

=== Romania ===
Romania had an interest in securing its borders from Soviet aggression and expansion, however it also suffered from bad relations with Hungary. The two countries had long been in territorial disputes over the Transylvania region, which did not end after Hungary pulled out of the region following World War I. Romania pursued a national defense strategy, hoping to avoid annexation and conflict with both the Soviets and Hungary.

=== Hungary ===
Hungary was more inclined to be in favor of the proposal, due to both it and Poland having territorial claims in Czechoslovakia. Budapest hoped to revise the Treaty of Trianon, which granted territories of the Kingdom of Hungary to Czechoslovakia, among others. Hungary saw the proposed alliance as a means of preserving independence from Germany, which was rapidly expanding through Central Europe, thus Hungarian participation in Beck's plan was driven more by opportunism rather than ideological alignment.

=== Italy ===
Despite Italy being a part of the Rome-Berlin Axis and being an ally with Germany, they still supported the idea of a Third Europe. Many Italian officials called it a "Horizontal Axis," including foreign minister Galeazzo Ciano. Ciano was apprehensive about German influence in Southeastern Europe, a region he believed should be under Italian influence. He hoped that Germany's Anschluss would quell Hitler's expansionism, and although it was contrary to Italy's interests, Ciano still sought to build a bloc in Eastern Europe that was supported by Italy. "When Vienna becomes the second German capital," Ciano said to Prince Paul of Yugoslavia, "Budapest should be ours."

== Bibliography ==
- Cienciala, Anna (1999). Igor Lukes and Erik Goldstein (ed.). The Munich crisis of 1938: Plans and Strategy in Warsaw in the context of Wester appeasement of Germany. London: Frank Cass. pp. 48–81.
- Greenwood, Sean (2002). "Danzig: the phantom crisis, 1939". In Gordon Martel (ed.). Origins of the Second World War Reconsidered A.J.P. Taylor and the Historians. London: Taylor & Francis. p. 227. ISBN 9781134714186.
- Kornat, M. (2008): Realna koncepcja czy wizja ex post? Polska idea „Trzeciej Europy” (1937–1938). Online: http://politologia.wsb-nlu.edu.pl [28.11.2008].
- Watt, Richard (1998). Bitter Glory Poland and its Fate (third ed.). Hippocrene Books. ISBN 0781806739.
- Weinberg, Gerhard (1980). The Foreign Policy of Hitler's Germany Volume 2 Starting World War Two 1937-1939. Chicago: University of Chicago Press.
