= Danzig crisis =

1939 diplomatic crisis between Poland and Nazi Germany

- Part of the interwar period
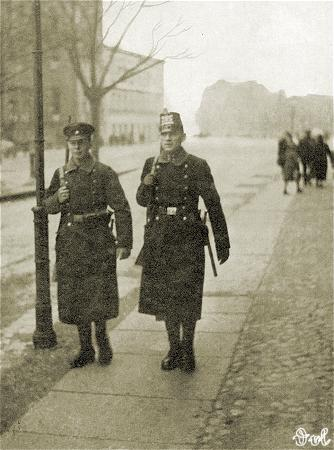
- Danzig policemen in winter coats on foot patrol
Date	21 March – 1 September 1939
Location	Free City of Danzig (present-day Gdańsk, Poland)
Result	German invasion of Poland: Beginning of World War II

Belligerents
Poland Supported by: France; United Kingdom	(Free City of Danzig) Danzig	(Nazi Germany) Germany

The Danzig crisis was an important prelude to World War II. The crisis lasted from March 1939 until the outbreak of war on 1 September 1939. The crisis began when tensions escalated between Nazi Germany and the Second Polish Republic over the Free City of Danzig (present-day Gdańsk, Poland). The city, since the early 14th century largely German-speaking, had been ruled variously by Polish and German authorities in its long history. After the Partition of Poland, it had been ruled by Prussia from 1793 and the German Empire from 1871.

At the end of World War I the city came under the governance of the League of Nations (via the Treaty of Versailles) and was placed under a settlement that aligned it with Poland for external affairs, despite the fact that this arrangement was opposed by the local population. As part of his aggressive foreign policy after the Nazi rise to power, Adolf Hitler sought to bring Danzig back under German control, and also wished Poland to sign the Anti-Comintern Pact. Poland refused these initial demands, and Hitler began to plan a full-scale invasion, informing his subordinates that he was no longer interested in a peaceful settlement.

Despite Britain and France guaranteeing Poland's territorial integrity, key German officials such as Joachim von Ribbentrop were convinced that Britain and France would not go to war over Poland. The crisis reached its peak when Germany, on 1 September 1939, invaded Poland in the planned Fall Weiss. Following the invasion, Britain and France declared war on Germany, thus beginning the Second World War. The Danzig issue, therefore, was central to the breakdown of diplomacy and the onset of the war in Europe.

== Background ==
=== End of World War I ===
On 8 January 1918, the U.S. President Woodrow Wilson proclaimed the 14 Points as the American war aims. Point 13 called for Polish independence to be restored after the war and for Poland to have "free and secure access to the sea", a statement that implied the German deep-water port of Danzig (modern Gdańsk, Poland), located at a strategic location where a branch of the river Vistula flows into the Baltic Sea, should become part of Poland. Danzig was known as the "Amsterdam of the East" owing to its strongly Dutch-style architecture and its traditional role as a trading center that linked the markets of eastern Europe to the wider world. At the Paris peace conference in 1919, two of the "Big Three" leaders—Wilson and the French premier Georges Clémenceau—supported the Polish claim to Danzig, but the British Prime Minister David Lloyd George was opposed under the grounds that the population of Danzig was about 90% German.

In a compromise, it was agreed that Danzig would become a Free City that would belong to neither Germany nor Poland, but the latter was to have special rights in the city. The city-state would govern itself via a volkstag (people's assembly) while executive council was the Senate, but the League of Nations would appoint a Commissioner to oversee the affairs of the Free City. The Senate president served as the head of government for the Free City. The Polish delegation to the Paris peace conference led by Roman Dmowski had asked for the cession of Danzig to Poland, and within Poland the creation of the Free City was widely seen as a betrayal of Point 13. The Polish position was always that Poland needed Danzig to be economically independent of Germany as Danzig was where most of Poland's exports and imports to the wider world went through. The loss of Danzig did indeed deeply hurt German national pride and in the interwar period, German nationalists spoke of the "open wound in the east" that was the Free City of Danzig. The precise legal status of Danzig was ambiguous as the American historian Elizabeth Clark noted: "...few experts, whether Polish, French or German, agreed on a legal description of the city, whether it was a sovereign state, a state without sovereignty, a Polish protectorate or a League of Nations protectorate". The Free City had some of the markers of sovereignty such as its own police force, anthem, flag, currency and stamps.

=== French alliances in central and eastern Europe ===
In February 1921, France and Poland signed a defensive alliance committing both powers to go to war in the event of an attack by Germany. The alliance with Poland was the cornerstone of the cordon sanitaire, as the French system of alliances in Eastern Europe were known, as France signed defensive alliances with Czechoslovakia in 1924, Kingdom of Romania in 1926 and Kingdom of Yugoslavia in 1927. At the time the alliances were signed, the Rhineland was demilitarized and occupied by the French Army, which was in a strong position to launch an offensive deep into Germany. The Rhineland, with the broad Rhine river and its steep hills, formed a natural defensive barrier and beyond the Rhineland was the wide open North German plain, which favored offensive operations.

=== End of the French occupation of the Rhineland, Maginot Line ===
In June 1930, the French ended the occupation of the Rhineland five years earlier than the Treaty of Versailles had called for. As nobody in the French government actually expected the Germans to abide by the Treaty of Versailles, it was assumed that the Rhineland would be remilitarized at some point in the near future. The construction of the Maginot Line, beginning in 1929, can be seen as a tacit admission of this. The Maginot Line implied a defensive strategy in the event of war, which created a major strategic problem, namely how France would aid its allies in Eastern Europe should Germany turn east instead of west.

=== Situation in Danzig 1932 ===
The city-state of Danzig was widely considered to be "the most dangerous city in Europe" as the Free City was a flashpoint in German–Polish relations that could cause a war at any moment. Throughout its existence, the German and Polish populations of Danzig clashed over a number of issues while relations between the Free City and Poland were antagonistic. Since Poland was allied to France, any German–Polish war would automatically become a Franco–German war, thereby starting another world war. A speech given by a British journalist in October 1932 noted: "Germany intends to have Danzig and the Corridor. I have no brief for her. I deplore the fact that several million Germans would shed blood for this cause, but since it is a fact and the Poles certainly cannot be talked out of their territory, how will the matter be settled except by arms? I believe there must be a war in Europe; the best we can hope for is that it will be over soon, and that it will not spread".

=== Hitler in power ===
On 30 January 1933, Adolf Hitler became Reichskanzler (Nazi seizure of power). The Danzig Nazis took over the Free City of Danzig, and thereafter, the leadership of the Free City followed the line set by Berlin. It was always the intention of Hitler to have the Free City of Danzig "go home to the Reich", but knowing that the Polish government was unwilling to see any alteration in the status of the Free City he did not press the matter in the early years of the Third Reich. The leadership of the Danzig Nazis was highly dysfunctional with power being shared by two feuding leaders, Albert Forster and Arthur Greiser. Forster was the Gauleiter of Danzig while Greiser served as the Senate president. The American historian Gerhard Weinberg wrote: "The two could not abide each, and the very fact that both were faithful followers of Hitler only made them rivals for the latter's affection and support. What one wanted, the other automatically rejected, and vice-versa; only the occasional intervention of Hitler himself could bring them temporarily to the same course—until they parted company again on the next issue". Franco–Polish relations became increasingly strained with the French charging that the Poles only valued the alliance for the protection it afforded them against Germany.

In May 1935, Marshal Józef Piłsudski, Poland's de facto leader since the May coup of 1926, died and was replaced by a triumvirate. The new leadership of the Sanacja regime, as the Polish military dictatorship was known, was divided about the course of action to be pursued. The commander of the Polish Army, Marshal Edward Rydz-Śmigły favored incorporating the Free City into Poland while the Foreign Minister, Colonel Józef Beck was more open to a compromise. Beck favored the idea of "Third Europe", a bloc of East European nations to be led by Poland and was willing to accept a German–Polish condominium over Danzig in exchange for German support for the "Third Europe" concept. However, the Sanacja regime had become unpopular by the late 1930s, and many Poles disliked Beck's foreign policy of weakening ties to France while improving relations with Germany. Polish opposition groups to the Sanacja regime such as the Front Morges led by General Władysław Sikorski accused Beck of being too anti-French and pro-German in his foreign policy. Beck was always very sensitive to the charge that his foreign policy was too pro-German and he was not willing to accept any bullying over the Danzig issue, which he saw as the "barometer" of German–Polish relations. Beck's Third Europe concept failed because Germany had the world's second largest economy and all of eastern Europe was dominated economically by the Reich even before the Second World War, which led to a tendency in eastern Europe to follow the lead of Berlin rather than Warsaw. In 1936, the League of Nations commissioner for the Free City of Danzig, the Irish diplomat Seán Lester, was fired under heavy German pressure for his attempts to protect the rights of Danzig's Jewish minority. The new League of Nations commissioner, the Swiss diplomat Carl J. Burckhardt, was known as an advocate of "restraint" towards the Nazi-dominated government of the Free City, and generally followed a pro-German line. Burckhardt described the office of high commissioner in the Free City as "a slowly dying organ of a decadent institution". In 1939, the population of the Free City of Danzig was 400,000, of whom 17,000 were Polish and 3,000 were Jewish, with 380,000 being German.

== The beginning of the crisis ==
=== German demand for "overall settlement" ===
In October 1938, the German Foreign Minister, Joachim von Ribbentrop, invited the Polish ambassador, Józef Lipski, to meet him in Berchtesgaden. Lipski was confused as to why he could not see Ribbentrop in Berlin and had to go all the way to Berchtesgaden for this meeting that Ribbentrop insisted was extremely important. At their lunch at the Grand Hotel in Berchtesgaden, Ribbentrop told Lipski that he wanted a "Gesamtlösung" ("overall settlement") between Poland and Germany. Ribbentrop wanted Danzig to be returned to the Reich; extraterritorial roads running across the Polish Corridor to link East Prussia with the rest of Germany and for Poland to sign the Anti-Comintern Pact. Lipski told Ribbentrop that he felt it was highly unlikely that Beck would agree to these demands. Alarmed, Lipski on the next day took the train to Warsaw where he met Beck and his deputy Count Jan Szembek. Lipski believed Ribbentrop, and presumably Hitler as well, were determined to see Danzig returned to Germany.

=== Bonnet advocates end to French alliance system in eastern Europe ===
Starting in October 1938, the French Foreign Minister Georges Bonnet advocated the end of the French alliance system in Eastern Europe and ordered the officials of the Quai d'Orsay to start preparations for renouncing the French alliances with the Soviet Union and Poland. In October 1938 Bonnet spoke before the Foreign Affairs Committee on the Chamber of Deputies, where he testified for his wish to "restructure" the French alliance system in Eastern Europe and of his desire to "renegotiate" treaties which might bring France into a war "when French security is not directly threatened". Bonnet found his efforts to end the eastern alliances blocked by opposition from other members of the French government. During a conversation with a group of Deputies who had formally asked Bonnet to end the alliances in Eastern Europe, Bonnet stated: "If I was free, I would carry out your policy; but I am not: I would have against me the majority of the Cabinet, led by Reynaud and Mandel, and I cannot count on Daladier, for Gamelin believes that in the event of war Polish military assistance would be indispensable".

=== Poland refuses German demands ===
In November 1938, Lipski met with Ribbentrop and read him a statement declaring that the Polish government was unwilling to accept any changes in the status of the Free City, but still wanted good relations with the Reich. Lipski told Ribbentrop that Polish public opinion would not tolerate the Free City rejoining Germany and predicated that if Warsaw allowed that to happen, then the Sanacja military dictatorship that had ruled Poland since 1926 would be overthrown. On 10 November 1938, Hitler gave a secret speech to a group of German journalists, where he complained at length that his "peace speeches"—during which he stressed that his major foreign policy goal was the peaceful revision of the Treaty of Versailles—had been too successful with the German people. Hitler ended his speech by saying that it was necessary for German journalists to write as if the Reich were already at war to prepare the German people for a war that he predicated would occur in the near future. President Franklin D. Roosevelt of the United States did not want a war with Germany, but favored a policy he called "methods-short-of-war" under which the United States would supply the war efforts of Britain and France. On 14 November 1938, at a meeting in the White House, Roosevelt laid out an ambitious plan for the United States to build enough aircraft to give the margin of air superiority to the Royal Air Force and Armée de l'Air, which he believed would deter Hitler from ever going to war. William C. Bullitt, the American ambassador to France, who attended the White House meeting exclaimed: "The moral is: if you have enough airplanes you don't have to go to Berchtesgaden". Roosevelt stated: "Had we had this summer 5,000 planes and the capacity immediately to produce 10,000 per year, even though I have to ask Congress for the authority to sell or lend to the countries in Europe, Hitler would not have dared to take the stand he did". In a letter to Chamberlain, Roosevelt promised him that the industrial might of the United States would support Britain in a war. Roosevelt promised Jean Monnet that his administration would evade the Neutrality Act by shipping aircraft parts to Canada to be assembled and shipped off to France. During his talks with Lipski and Beck in the winter of 1938–1939, Ribbentrop's main demand was not that Poland allow the return of the Free City, but rather that Poland sign the Anti-Comintern Pact, which was a symbolic gesture that was understood in Berlin as a sign that Poland accepted being in the German sphere of influence. During the same period, Hungary signed the Anti-Comintern Pact, which both Hitler and Ribbentrop understood as a symbolic gesture that Hungary was now in the German sphere of influence.

=== Hitler's summit with King Carol II of Romania, night of the vampires ===
On 24 November 1938, King Carol II of Romania visited Germany to meet Hitler at the Berghof in the Bavarian Alps, where the principal subject was German–Romanian economic relations, especially oil. Weinberg wrote: "Carol made the needed concessions, but he demonstrated his concern for his country's independence by driving a very hard bargain". The British historian D.C. Watt wrote that Carol had a "trump card" by controlling the oil, without which the German military could not function. The Germans were therefore willing to pay a high price for the necessary Romanian oil. The Four Year Plan was intended to make Germany self-sufficient in artificial oil made from coal by 1940, but had run into major delays and cost overruns. Hermann Göring, the chief of the Four Year Plan organisation, had informed Hitler in November 1938 that, due to problems with the new technology, the synthetic oil plants would be not be operating by September 1940 as planned, and that 1942 would be a more likely date. During the Hitler–Carol summit at the Berghof, Hitler demanded that Carol free Corneliu Zelea Codreanu, the leader of the fascist Legion of the Archangel Michael (whom Carol had imprisoned in May 1938) and appoint him Prime Minister. During the Hitler–Carol summit, Hitler ordered the Wehrmacht to begin plans to occupy the Free City with the aim of returning it to Germany. On 25 November 1938, Bonnet ordered the French Ambassador in Warsaw Léon Noël, to find an excuse for terminating the 1921 Franco-Polish alliance. His views on this issue created considerable opposition within the Quai d'Orsay, where it was argued that Poland was too valuable an ally to be abandoned, and that if France renounced the Polish alliance, Warsaw would align with Berlin.

Believing that his grip on his throne was weak as long as an alternative leadership existed (in the form of Codreanu) that Hitler might back, Carol decided to wipe out the leadership of the Legion. On the night of 30 November 1938, known in Romania as the "Night of the Vampires", Codreanu and 13 other Legion leaders were taken from prison out to a remote rural road where they were all garroted to death and then shot, with the official story being they were all "shot while trying to escape". The German media launched a major campaign against Carol for the "Night of Vampires", which was described as an act of murder and a "victory for the Jews". Despite the campaign against Carol, on 10 December 1938 a German-Romanian economic agreement was signed that provided for more Romanian oil exports to Germany.

=== Bonnet and Ribbentrop meet ===
On 6 December 1938, Ribbentrop visited Paris, where he and the French foreign minister Georges Bonnet signed a grand-sounding but largely meaningless Declaration of Franco-German Friendship. During his visit, Ribbentrop and Bonnet had a long conversation in French in the Tuileries Garden where Bonnet was alleged to have told Ribbentrop that France now recognized all of Eastern Europe as being within the German sphere of influence and that the French alliance system in Eastern Europe was effectively defunct. Since Ribbentrop first publicly claimed this in June 1939, there has been much debate over exactly what Bonnet told Ribbentrop, but Ribbentrop believed—and persuaded Hitler—that France would never go to war for Poland. The British historian Michael Bloch wrote that Bonnet almost certainly did make this statement to Ribbentrop, which accorded well with his dislike of the French alliances in Eastern Europe, but that this statement was legally null and void. Only the Assemblée nationale could repeal the treaties it had ratified, and Bonnet as foreign minister did not have the legal power to renounce France's alliances in Eastern Europe in the manner that Ribbentrop believed he did.

=== French factions ===
Governments under the Troisième République were unstable coalitions and the powers of the premier was more alike to being the chairman of a quarreling committee than an executive leader. The cabinet of Édouard Daladier was badly divided into three factions. The first was the "peace lobby" (the appeasement faction) led by Bonnet and which included Jean Mistler, Henry Bérenger, Jean Montigny, Anatole de Monzie, François Piétri, Lucien Lamoureux, and Joseph Caillaux. Another faction, the "policy of firmness" (the anti-appeasement faction) was made up of Paul Reynaud, Jean Zay, and Georges Mandel. A third faction led by Daladier stood between the "peace lobby" and the "policy of firmness". Daladier had supported a policy of appeasement in 1938 largely out of his perception of French weakness regarding the Reich, but in 1939, he tended to favor the "policy of firmness". Daladier's change in stance was due to increased French industrial production together with the efforts of the Colonial minister Mandel to raise more troops in France's populous African colonies along with the equally populous colony of French Indochina, which provided a way of compensating for Germany's greater population. French decision-making during the Danzig crisis was divided, with Bonnet seeking a way to avoid going to war for Poland, while Daladier was willing to honor France's alliance with Poland should the Reich choose war.

=== German schools of thought on Danzig ===
In late 1938 through early 1939, there were two German schools of thought about Danzig. One, led by Forster, favored the "little solution" of sending in troops to occupy the city and returning it by force to Germany. The "big solution" involved making a deal under which Poland would accept Danzig returning to Germany in exchange for German support for Poland annexing parts of the Soviet Union. At this time, Hitler was determined upon a war against Britain and tended to favor the "big solution" of bringing Poland into the German sphere of influence. Beck told Count Hans-Adolf von Moltke, the German ambassador in Warsaw, that he was planning to spend his Christmas holiday on the French Riviera and gambling in the casinos of Monte Carlo. Beck added that he was willing to meet Ribbentrop in Berlin on his way back from his Christmas on the Riviera. Ribbentrop agreed to the meeting, but when Beck arrived at the Berlin train station on 5 January 1939, he was instead placed on another train to secretly meet with Hitler at the Berghof. At this meeting, Hitler was adamant with Beck that the Free City of Danzig had to "go home to the Reich", and he was unwilling to accept compromises on the issue. Beck stated that on economic grounds that his government could never accept Danzig returning to Germany as that would reduce Poland to an economic colony of Germany. However, Beck agreed that Ribbentrop should visit Warsaw later that month to discuss the matter.

The Wehrmacht generals were extremely anti-Polish, but at a meeting on 22 January 1939, Ribbentrop argued against war with Poland as he felt it was still possible to force Beck into accepting the German line.

=== Ribbentrop goes to Warsaw, Hitler speaks of Polish friendship ===
In January 1939, Ribbentrop visited Warsaw, where he was greeted by President Ignacy Mościcki with much pomp. The Beck–Ribbentrop meeting went badly with Beck again saying that for economic reasons Poland could never accept Danzig being returned to Germany. Ribbentrop in his account of the meeting stated that Beck was willing in principle to accept the return of Danzig to the Reich. After the Warsaw summit, Beck told his cabinet chief Michał Łubieński, that he did not want to be seen to be bullied, but he was willing to agree to a German–Polish codominion over Danzig. Hitler in his annual speech to the Reichstag on 30 January 1939 spoke about the importance of German–Polish friendship, which showed that he had not decided upon war against Poland by this point. On 31 January 1939, Roosevelt called a secret meeting at the White House with the Senate Military Affairs Committee to inform them of the existence of the French military mission. In an "off-the-record" comment, Roosevelt stated: "As soon as one nation dominates Europe, that nation will be able to turn to the world sphere...That is why the safety of the Rhine frontier does necessarily interest us". The remark was leaked to the press, which misquoted Roosevelt's comment as being "America's frontier is on the Rhine", and ignited an uproar. On the defensive, Roosevelt was forced to drop his plans to revise the Neutrality acts.

=== February 1939 student brawls in Danzig ===
In February 1939, German and Polish university students in Danzig were involved in a number of bloody brawls, which attracted much attention in the Polish press. At the Café Langfuhr that was popular with students from the Danzig Polytechnic, the German students put up a sign, reading "To dogs and Polish students entrance is forbidden. Poor dogs!". The sign led to fights breaking out between Polish and German students. The incidents limited the room to maneuver by the Polish state, which did not want to be seen to be bullied as Polish public opinion was outraged by the brawling caused by the Café Langfuhr sign. On 25 February 1939, a group of Polish university students held a demonstration outside the German embassy in Warsaw and threw bricks at the windows out of anger over the brawls at the Café Langfuhr.

== The Tilea Affair and the British "guarantee" of Poland ==
=== Munich Agreement broken ===
On 15 March 1939, Germany violated the Munich Agreement by occupying the Czech half of Czecho-Slovakia, which became the Protectorate of Bohemia-Moravia. On 17 March 1939, Chamberlain gave a speech in Birmingham where he declared that Britain would oppose, by war if necessary, any German effort at world domination. On 18 March 1939, the minutes recorded Chamberlain as saying at a cabinet meeting:

"The Prime Minister said that up till a week ago we had proceeded on the assumption that we should be able to continue with our policy of getting on to better terms with the Dictator Powers, and that although those powers had aims, those aims were limited. ... He had now come definitely to the conclusion that Herr Hitler's attitude made it impossible to continue on the old basis. ... No reliance could be placed on any of the assurances given by the Nazi leaders. ... he regarded his speech [in Birmingham of March 17] as a challenge to Germany on the issue whether or not Germany intended to dominate Europe by force. It followed that if Germany took another step in the direction of dominating Europe, she would be accepting the challenge".

=== Tilea affair ===
On 17 March 1939, the so-called Tilea affair began when Virgil Tilea, the Romanian minister-plenipotentiary in London, told Lord Halifax that his country was faced with a German invasion following the Romanian refusal to hand over control of the Romanian oil industry to the Reich. As Romania was rich in various natural resources, above all in oil, this was felt in London to be an unacceptable change in the balance of power. Germany did not have oil of its own and the German need to import oil from the United States, Mexico and Venezuela left Germany open to a crippling British naval blockade; by contrast, if the Romanian oil industry came under German control, the Reich would be immune to a naval blockade. The "limited liability" rearmament doctrine of the Chamberlain government in which funds were lavished on the Royal Air Force and Royal Navy while the British Army was reduced down to a glorified "colonial police force" left Britain without the military force to protect Romania. In an attempt to find allies for Romania, the British diplomats asked for help in Paris, Warsaw, Moscow, Athens, Ankara, and Belgrade.

Tilea also asked on behalf of King Carol II for a British loan to finance Romanian rearmament and for British help with creating a bloc of Romania, Greece, Poland, Yugoslavia and Turkey to resist the Reich. Colonel Beck's evasive answers as to what Poland would do if Germany invaded Romania infuriated Alexis St. Léger-Léger, the secretary-general of the Quai d'Orsay. At a meeting with Juliusz Łukasiewicz, the Polish ambassador to France, St. Léger told him in a moment of some rage: "Poland refuses to join France and England in protecting Romania". To express his frustration with Beck, St. Léger sent long letters in English to both the British Foreign Secretary Lord Halifax and the prime minister Neville Chamberlain that denounced Colonel Beck as an unscrupulous and unprincipled opportunist whose word was not to be trusted. St. Léger's picture of Beck as an amoral and ruthless man who only acted out of self-interest had much influence on British decision-makers. Beck was a man widely mistrusted both within Poland and without. The French deeply disliked Beck while a Foreign Office memo described Beck "as a menace, perhaps second only to Herr von Ribbentrop". On 18 March 1939, Daladier had a long telephone conversation with Colonel Beck, where it was agreed that a German seizure of the Free City would be a sufficient casus belli for France to activate the Franco-Polish alliance provided that Poland agreed to convert the Polish-Romanian alliance aimed against the Soviet Union into an alliance against Germany as well. Daladier told Beck that France would only to go to war for Poland in exchange for Poland agreeing to defend Romania from Germany.

On 20 March 1939, Germany pressured Lithuania to return Memel (modern Klaipėda) to Germany. On 21 March 1939, Ribbentrop told Lipski that der Führer was "increasingly amazed" at Poland's refusal to accept the return of Danzig and warned that German media would soon start a press campaign asking for Danzig to "go home to the Reich". In response to Lipski's reports, Rydz-Śmigły ordered a partial Polish mobilization. On 21 March 1939, Bonnet noted in a telephone call to Lord Halifax that Poland was the only nation in Eastern Europe that was capable of helping Romania resist a German invasion. Halifax told Bonnet: "His Majesty's Government thought it was now a question of checking German aggression, against France or Great Britain or Holland or Switzerland or Romania or Poland or Yugoslavia or whoever it might be. They saw no escape from this". Beck was opposed to the plans of King Carol II for an Eastern European bloc, which he felt was too provocative towards Germany.

In London, Halifax approached the Polish ambassador, Count Edward Raczyński, and in Warsaw, the British ambassador, Sir Howard William Kennard, approached Beck for a plan for a joint statement to be issued calling for a bloc of Britain, France, Poland, Yugoslavia, Turkey, Greece, Romania and the Soviet Union to resist any further German invasion. Beck rejected the British plan, saying that he regarded the Soviet Union as a far greater danger to Poland than Germany and instead proposed a bilateral Anglo-Polish treaty with a promise of British support for the Polish position regarding Danzig. British elites regarded Poland as a far stronger power than the Soviet Union and Halifax later stated: "We had to make a choice between Poland and the Soviet Union; it seemed clear that Poland would give the greater value". The quid pro quo of the British "guarantee" of Poland was that Poland in turn would be willing to protect Romania and its oil from Germany.

Daladier privately felt that Germany had a strong moral case for the return of Danzig, and only decided to back Poland as a way to block German ambitions to dominate Europe. Together with St. Léger and Marshal Maurice Gamelin, Daladier envisioned a bloc to consist of France, Great Britain, Poland, the Soviet Union, Romania and Yugoslavia that would resist the hegemonic claims of the Reich. Daladier saw Poland as playing a crucial role in the projected bloc that came to be known as the "peace front", and agreed to support the Polish rights with regard to Danzig as the price for Poland playing the role that he wanted her to play. Though it was Tilea that began the crisis, on 23 March 1939 King Carol capitulated to Helmuth Wohlthat and signed a new German-Romanian economic treaty that virtually turned Romania into a German economic colony with Romania to sell its oil and agriculture exclusively to Germany. The terms of the new German-Romanian agreement were so favorable to the Reich that both the Hungarians and the Bulgarians who had territorial claims against Romania believed that Carol had only signed the treaty because he bartered his country's economic independence in exchange for a German guarantee of Romania's borders.

=== Germany and Poland prepare for war ===
On 24 March 1939, after overseeing Memel's return to Germany, Hitler returned to Berlin, where he stated that the "little solution" was not possible as it would mean war with Poland, and to have Danzig returned would require the liquidation of the Polish state. On 22 March 1939, Gauleiter Forster announced that the elections for the Senate of the Free City due in 1939 would not be held, a violation of the constitution of the Free City. On 24 March 1939, Beck, who was part of the triumvirate which ruled the Sanacja regime and largely ran foreign policy on his own, told a meeting of the Polish cabinet that Poland should go to war if Germany made any attempt to alter the status of Danzig. Beck stated that Danzig "regardless of what it is worth as an object" had become a "symbol" in Poland that was so important that Poland should go to war over the issue. Aside from the possibility that a revolution in Poland might overthrow the Sanacja regime should it allow Danzig to be returned to Germany, Beck as part of his plans for a "Third Europe" (i.e. a block of Eastern European states under Polish leadership) had sought to develop closer economic relations with Sweden and Finland. Beck envisioned both Sweden and Finland joining the "Third Europe" block, and German plans to take back Danzig threatened to allow Germany a "choke-hold" on Poland's main link to the sea as the port facilities at Danzig were still better developed than those at Gdynia. On 25 March 1939, Hitler ordered General Walther von Brauchitsch, the commander-in-chief of the Army, to start plans for a war against Poland that summer. In a further escalation of the crisis, Forster and Greiser began to raise paramilitary forces in Danzig to confront the Polish garrison on the Westerplatte.

On 26 March, Ribbentrop was extremely angry with Lipski when the latter gave him a memo saying that Poland was still committed to preserving the status quo with regard to Danzig. On 26 March 1939, a Polish offer made by Lipski for a joint German-Polish guarantee of Danzig and for customs-free travel across the Polish Corridor was rejected by Ribbentrop. On 27 March 1939, General Walter Warlimont of the OKW started working on Fall Weiss (Case White), the plan for the invasion of Poland, and by the end of the month, the first draft of Fall Weiss was completed. The choice of late August-early September 1939 as the moment to begin Fall Weiss was decided by Hitler himself. Weinberg wrote: "The choice of a fall campaign in 1938 and 1939 was not accidental: Hitler wished to move after the harvest and before bad weather set in; he wanted enough time for his own first campaign, but with a winter immediately afterward separating that campaign from any offensive by the Western powers. In 1938, he had at the last moment recoiled from war; in 1939 the calendar would be more rigid both because Hitler was more determined and because the autumn rains in Poland made any postponement beyond the 1 September date he had tentatively set extremely dangerous". On 29 March 1939 Baron Ernst von Weizsäcker, the State Secretary of the Auswärtiges Amt, told the Danzig government the Reich would carry out a policy to the Zermürbungspolitik ("attrition politics") towards Poland, saying a compromise solution was not wanted. On 30 March 1939, the British Prime Minister, Neville Chamberlain met with the Foreign Secretary Lord Halifax and the Foreign Office's Permanent Undersecretary, Sir Alexander Cadogan, to write up a statement warning that Britain would go to war if Germany invaded Poland. When Sir Eric Phipps, the British ambassador in Paris, asked Bonnet for his approval on the "guarantee" on 30 March, it was immediately granted without Bonnet consulting the rest of the French cabinet.

=== Chamberlain announces the British guarantee of Poland ===
On 31 March 1939, Chamberlain announced in the House of Commons a "guarantee" of Polish independence, stating that Britain would go to war with Germany if there was an attempt to end Polish independence, though Chamberlain pointedly excluded the borders of Poland from the "guarantee". The "guarantee" caused much opposition from the Dominions. Later on 31 March, the South African High Commissioner to Great Britain, Charles Theodore Te Water and Vincent Massey, the Canadian High Commissioner to Great Britain, both told Chamberlain during a meeting at 10 Downing Street that Germany "had a genuine claim to Danzig", which made it an "extremely bad reason" to risk a war over. Daladier was furious with Bonnet for granting his approval of the "guarantee" as he told the French cabinet the next day: "the guarantee goes a long way, indeed further than our own alliance, because the decision to engage Britain's entire military strength will rest in Warsaw". With the British "guarantee", Daladier had lost leverage over Beck who now had two great power allies instead of one, and he realized that Bonnet had given his approval of the British "guarantee" as a way to sabotage Daladier's policy of restructuring the Franco-Polish alliance to confront Germany. Marshal Gamelin likewise complained that Chamberlain should have forced Beck to agree to give the Red Army transit rights across Poland before he gave the "guarantee". On 1 April 1939, Hitler went to Wilhelmshaven to oversee the launch of the new battleship Tirpitz. At the Wilhelmshaven Rathaus (town hall), Hitler gave a violently anti-Polish and anti-British speech. Hitler had hopes of severing France from an emerging Anglo-French alliance, and largely spared France from abuse in his Wilhelmshaven speech. The Auswärtiges Amt was very anti-Polish as Weinberg noted that "Weizsäcker's rabid anti-Polish views and his extreme anger over the British guarantee of Poland were by no means unique". Weizsäcker and the other professional diplomats of the Auswärtiges Amt very much welcomed the coming destruction of Poland and despite their post-war claims supported Fall Weiss. In April 1939, Beck visited London to ask for an Anglo-Polish military alliance, saying this was the best way to deter Germany from war.

=== Soviet intelligence reports ===
The Soviet Union was well informed by its spies about the nature of the crisis. From Tokyo, Richard Sorge, the Japan correspondent of Frankfurter Zeitung newspaper who worked as the top Soviet spy in Japan informed Moscow of the problems in German-Japanese talks. Sorge mentioned that the Japanese wanted the proposed alliance to be directed against the Soviet Union while the Germans wanted the alliance to be directed against Great Britain. Rudolf von Scheliha, the Second Secretary at the German embassy in Warsaw, had been an informant to the GRU from 1937, and throughout the crisis Scheliha informed his Soviet handlers that the Reich was making demands on the Poles that kept being rejected.

== The "Peace Front" ==
=== Australian support for British guarantee of Poland ===
A major factor in British policy during the Danzig crisis was the increased support from the Dominions. Australia, which, under Prime Minister Joseph Lyons, had refused to go for war for Czechoslovakia in 1938, was more supportive with regard to Poland. Lyons declared his support for the British "guarantee" despite the fact it was the complete opposite of everything that he advocated until then, which many felt contributed to his premature death on 7 April 1939. The new Australian prime minister, Robert Menzies, continued his long-standing policy of supporting Danzig rejoining Germany, though he stated his opposition on 28 March 1939 to "...an unimpeded march by Germany to a territorial conquest of middle and southeastern Europe". Menzies made clear his belief that Britain should pressure Poland into allowing Danzig to rejoin Germany and to return the Polish Corridor, but his fears of Japan led him to loyally support British policy out of the fear that opposing Britain would leave Australia exposed to face Japan alone. Menzies, rather like Chamberlain, believed that he would end the crisis with a Munich-type deal that would see the Free City rejoin Germany. The Australian historian E.M. Andrews wrote that the German destruction of Czecho-Slovakia had a "profound impact on Australian public opinion", which was more hostile towards Germany than had been the case in 1938. On Anzac Day in Sydney, nearly 1,000 Australian veterans gathered outside of the German consulate in Sydney to demand that the swastika flag be pulled down on the grounds that it was an insult to all Australians. This nearly caused a riot as the veterans pressed against the Sydney police in an attempt to pull down the flag. The historian Andrews noted that the swastika flag had been flying outside of the German consulate for years and it was only with the Danzig crisis that the flag became an issue for Anzac Day.

=== Beck's lasting hope for a negotiated settlement with Germany ===
Beck had not abandoned hopes of negotiating a settlement with Germany. During the spring and summer of 1939 it was the aim of British foreign policy to build a "peace front" embracing Britain, France, the Soviet Union and a number of other European states such as Poland, Romania, Yugoslavia, Greece and Turkey with the aim of "containing" Germany. Beck made it clear that he wanted no Polish-Soviet treaty to go along with the British-inspired "peace front" since an alliance with the Soviets would rule out any possibility of a settlement with Germany, which he still had hopes of reaching. Beck declined to have Polish diplomats take part in the talks between British, French and Soviet diplomats about having the Soviet Union join the "peace front", and during his visit to London in April 1939 he declined British offers to create a military alliance of Britain, Poland, the Soviet Union and Romania designed to block the Reich's efforts to expand its influence in Eastern Europe. The Polish historian Anita Prazmowska wrote that Beck's refusal of the British offers of assistance was partly due to his "inflated sense of self-importance and the general overestimation of Poland's military potential" as he believed that Poland was one of the world's great powers and that Poland could defeat Germany on its own, but also due to his desire not to have Poland join the anti-German "peace front" at a time when he still believed that he could settle the Danzig issue. During his visit to London on 4–6 April 1939 Beck told Chamberlain that any effort to include the Soviet Union in the "peace front" would cause the very war it was supposed to prevent, and he wanted to exclude the Soviet Union from the "peace front" for that reason. On 3 April 1939, both Colonel Beck and Raczyński met with Lord Halifax who stressed that the British government did not want to go to war for Danzig and urged the Poles to make concessions. Raczyński told Halifax that with his demand for concessions on the Danzig issue, "the British government exhibits its ignorance of the actual state of affairs". Beck stated that he wanted British support, but he declined Halifax's offer of Britain serving as an "honest broker" as he stated that Poland would negotiate directly with Germany over Danzig.

=== German disinterest in negotiation, Hitler renounces nonaggression pact ===
On 5 April 1939 Weizsäcker told Moltke that he under no conditions was to negotiate with Beck, saying the last thing he wanted was for Beck to agree to the Free City's return to Germany. In April 1939, the League of Nations High Commissioner Burckhardt was told by the Polish Commissioner-General that any attempt to alter Danzig's status would be answered with armed resistance on the part of Poland. On 20 April 1939, Hitler's 50th birthday was celebrated with an especially impressive display of military might as thousands of troops and vehicles went past the Reich Chancellery. The purpose of the birthday parade was to send the message to Britain and France that Germany was more than prepared for war. This was a bid to divide Warsaw from London and Paris. On 28 April 1939, Hitler gave a speech at the Reichstag where he renounced the German-Polish non-aggression pact of 1934 and for the first time in public asked for Danzig to be returned. On 29 April, Marshal Gamelin asked Marshal Rydz-Smigly for permission to begin Franco-Polish staff talks.

=== French and British policy ===
During the crisis, Bonnet found himself opposed by almost all of the officials of the Quai d'Orsay led by St. Léger who accused him of wanting to end the alliance with Poland. Morale was high in the Quai d'Orsay as one French diplomat, Jean Chauvel recalled in 1971: "But finally and most important was their conviction that Hitler could not fight a war". Chauvel stated he and the other officials worked to sabotage Bonnet's policies as he wrote: "Their practical purpose was to resist the minister's policies and if necessary, thwart any action on his part". St. Léger favored a policy of British and French banks making generous loans to Poland to assist with the modernization of the Polish military "...at once in order to convince the Germans that France and England are determined to support Poland if Poland should become involved in a war with Germany".

On 4 May 1939, the French fascist Marcel Déat who secretly worked in the pay of the Auswärtiges Amt wrote in the Paris newspaper L'oeuvre an article entitled "Mourir pour Dantzig?" ("Die for Danzig?"), in which he argued against, saying that Poland was not worth a war. The phrase "die for Danzig?" that Déat introduced was often used by the German media during the crisis. A key concern for Germany in 1939 was to keep Belgium neutral. Belgium had signed an alliance with France in 1920, but declared itself neutral in 1936. From the German viewpoint, keeping Belgium neutral both prevented the Allies from threatening the Ruhr and made it easier for Germany to outflank the Maginot line by going through Belgium. Hitler went out of his way to stress to the Belgian minister that the Reich would respect Belgian neutrality in the event of war. The other nation that German diplomacy focused on was Sweden, which provided most of the iron that was used to create German steel. On 5 May 1939, Beck gave a speech before the Sejm, where he stated: "The position of Danzig is the result of a positive interplay of German and Polish interests. I have to ask myself 'what is the real object of this?' Is it the freedom of the German population of Danzig, which is not threatened, or a matter of prestige-or is it a matter of barring Poland from the Baltic, from which Poland will not allow herself to be barred". On the same day, Beck in a speech broadcast on Polish radio stated that Poland wanted peace but that "peace...has its price, high but definable. We in Poland do not recognize the conception of peace at any price. There is only one thing...which is without price, and that is honor". Before the Danzig crisis, the Polish General Staff had devoted far more time to planning a possible war with the Soviet Union rather than with Germany, and even after the Danzig crisis began, planning for a possible war with Germany went about in a rather haphazard and casual manner suggesting the Polish high command did not see war with Germany as very likely in 1939.

Forster had the Danzig newspapers print stories that claimed that Beck had demanded a Polish veto over the decisions of the Senate, Polish control of the heavy industry of the Free City and a Polish occupation, and treated the failure of these alleged demands to occur as a Polish retreat. In a further escalation, on 20 May three SA men from Danzig were involved in a brawl with the chauffeur of the Polish High Commissioner for Danzig in the frontier village of Kalthof (now Kałdowo, Malbork County), which ended with the chauffeur shooting and killing one of the SA men, Max Grubnau. At the time, both Forster and Greiser dismissed the Grubnau incident as unimportant to Burchkhardt, but later on in the summer of 1939 the killing of Grubnau played a central role in Nazi propaganda as an example of the alleged Polish "oppression" of the Germans of Danzig.

Ribbentrop, who was fluent in English, had served as the German ambassador in London between 1936 and 1938 and was considered as the Nazi's British expert, frequently advised Hitler that the United Kingdom would not go to war for Poland in 1939. Ribbentrop told Hitler that any war with Poland would last for only 24 hours, and that the British government would be so awed with this display of German might that they would not honor the "guarantee" of Polish independence. Along the same lines, Ribbentrop informed the Italian Foreign Minister Count Galeazzo Ciano on 5 May 1939 of his belief "It is certain that within a few months not one Frenchman nor a single Englishman will go to war for Poland". Ribbentrop supported his views by only showing Hitler diplomatic dispatches that supported his view that neither Britain or France would honour their commitments to Poland. In this, Ribbentrop was strongly supported by the German Ambassador in London, Herbert von Dirksen, who stated in a dispatch to Berlin that Chamberlain knew "the social structure of Britain, even the conception of the British Empire, would not survive the chaos of even a victorious war". Ribbentrop had the staff of the German Embassy in London provide translations for Hitler's benefit from pro-appeasement British newspapers, namely the Daily Mail owned by the fascist Lord Rothermere and the Daily Express owned by the "empire isolationist" Lord Beaverbrook, which made it appear that British public opinion was solidly against going to war for Danzig. The British historian Victor Rothwell noted that the Daily Express and the Daily Mail did not reflect either British policy in the Danzig crisis or British public opinion. The translations that Ribbentrop provided were especially important as Ribbentrop had persuaded Hitler that the Chamberlain government had secret control of the British media, just as the German government had control of German media in the Reich, and that British newspapers therefore reflected British government policy.

On 5 May 1939, Halifax in a memo to the cabinet wrote: "Danzig has become a test case and the stakes not be lower than the German attempt at domination of Eastern Europe and Polish determination to maintain the independence of their foreign policy". On 10 May 1939, Lord Halifax informed the cabinet that his major concern was the Danzig Senate under the leadership of its Nazi Senate president Greiser might vote for Danzig to rejoin Germany, which he feared could cause a war if the Poles sent forces into the Free City. Kennard was ordered to tell Beck that he was not to take any military action with regard to the Free City without consulting H.M. Government, a request that infuriated Beck, who told Kennard that he would consult the British, but he was not bound to follow their advice. The majority of the British cabinet led by Chamberlain and strongly supported by the National Liberal Chancellor of the Exchequer, Sir John Simon, favored resolving the crisis by allowing the Free City to rejoin Germany in exchange for a German promise to respect Polish independence. Another faction led by Halifax, while not rejecting the idea of Danzig rejoining Germany, were more concerned with halting German ambitions in Eastern Europe. The British dilemma was the fear that Beck might still ally Poland with Germany, which required a show of British support while at the same fearing that too much support might encourage Beck to reject a compromise solution to the crisis.

=== Hitler plans Fall Weiss ===
On 16 May 1939, Hitler gave orders to the Wehrmacht generals to begin preparations for a war against Poland scheduled for 26 August. In May 1939, the German media started a campaign demanding that Danzig "go home to the Reich". On 23 May 1939, Hitler at a meeting with the leading Wehrmacht generals stated he had decided upon war against Poland, and that the Danzig issue was a pretext as he wanted Poland to serve as German Lebensraum ("living space"). In the same conference, Hitler defended the Z Plan, which placed the Kriegsmarine first in terms of defense spending, saying that he did not expect Britain to go to war for Poland. Even if Britain did intervene, he argued that Germany could economically cripple Britain by conquering the Low Countries and France, saying control of the French Atlantic ports would give the Kriegsmarine access to the Western Approaches (the sea-lanes to the west of the British Isles where most of the ships going to or from Britain sail).

During the planning for Fall Weiss, Hitler was closely involved. Hitler generally approved of the plans by the Army and Luftwaffe generals, and his notable role was to insist to Admiral Erich Raeder that war begin in Danzig with the Kriegsmarine sending a warship into Danzig harbour. In June 1939, it was announced that German light cruiser Königsberg would visit Danzig harbour on 25 August 1939 to honor the sailors killed on the cruiser Magdeburg sunk by the Russians in August 1914. In his meetings with Forster, Hitler stressed that the Reich was to present itself as the victim of the Treaty of Versailles and was only seeking the return of Danzig because the city was overwhelmingly German. Hitler believed this propaganda would lead to public opinion in both France and the United Kingdom pressuring their governments not to go to war for Poland. Hitler ordered Forster to "keep the pot boiling" by having the Danzig authorities harass the Polish customs inspectors working on Danzig harbour. Colonel Beck usually ignored the other violations of Danzig's constitution by Forster and Greiser, and the subject of the customs inspectors was chosen because it was an issue that Beck could not ignore. Weizsäcker played a major role in inflaming the dispute over customs inspectors which he hoped would give Germany the perceived moral high-ground as part of the preparations for Fall Weiss.

=== Franco-Polish talks ===
Between 16 and 17 May 1939, Franco-Polish talks were started on France accelerating its arms deliveries to Poland. On 19 May 1939, a secret Franco-Polish agreement was signed in Paris calling in the event of war for France to launch an offensive into the Rhineland no later than 15 days after Germany had invaded Poland. The agreement was made only for political reasons, namely that Daladier wanted to reassure the Poles to resist German pressure. The Polish delegation had been led by the Military Affairs minister General Tadeusz Kasprzycki while the French delegation was led by Marshal Maurice Gamelin, the commander-in-chief of the French military. The British historian Martin Alexander wrote: "As far as Gamelin was concerned, had been blatantly misleading in sending Kasprzycki away from Paris believing that if Poland suffered a German attack, it could count on a bold French relief offensive against the Reich's western borders within three weeks". Bonnet refused to sign the political accord that went along the military accord, much to the visible annoyance of Gamelin who complained that the military accord was a dead letter without the political accord. Bonnet claimed that the political accord was not ready to be signed before Kasprzycki left Paris, but Gamelin learned from talking to St. Léger that this was a lie as the political accord had been prepared by the officials of the Quai d'Orsay before Kasprzycki had even arrived in Paris. Daladier was on holiday in the south of France, and by the time Gamelin was able to contact him via phone, Kasprzycki had already left Paris. Gamelin told Field Marshal Lord Gort, the chief of the Imperial General Staff, that he wanted the staff accord as a way to bind Poland to France. Gamelin openly admitted to Gort when he visited Paris that he had no intention of launching any offensive into Germany in the event of war. Gamelin told Gort that he did not expect Poland to win, but thought that Poland on its own could last for four to six months against Germany and even longer if it had Soviet support. Regardless of how long Poland could last, Gamelin expected the Poles to inflict "significant" damage on the Wehrmacht, which would thus be weaker when it turned west against France. Gamelin told Gort the purpose of his promises of an offensive he did not intend to launch were only a way of locking Poland into the alliance with France, and preventing Beck from allying Poland to Germany. Unlike Bonnet, Gamelin felt that France obtained benefits from the alliance with Poland, and over the course of the crisis he became increasingly disturbed at the "extraordinary" lengths, as he phrased it, that Bonnet went to in his quest to end the Polish alliance. On 19 May 1939, Count Johannes von Welczeck, the German ambassador in Paris, met with Bonnet to claim that the Reich did not want a conflict with France while he criticized Britain for an alleged "encirclement" policy of Germany. Welczeck told Bonnet that France would have to bear "the main burden of the struggle conjured up by Britain and make enormous sacrifice of life" as he claimed that France was being used by Britain. On 21 May 1939, Halifax, who had gone to Geneva to attend the spring session of the League of Nations, told Burckhardt that he wanted a compromise solution in which Danzig would remain a Free City, but would be represented in the Reichstag, thereby creating a link to Germany. Furthermore, Halifax wanted Germany to replace Poland as the power that represented the Free City abroad, but otherwise he wanted the special Polish rights in the Free City maintained. Burckhardt agreed to transmit Halifax's plan to both Berlin and Warsaw, but predicted the "chauvinism" of the Polish people would lead to its rejection.

Daladier very much wanted an Anglo-French-Soviet bloc to deter Germany from invading Poland, and he believed that constructing the "peace front" would be sufficient to stop a war in 1939. The French felt that the British were foot-dragging on including the Soviet Union in the "peace front", which was the source of much Anglo-French discord. On 3 June 1939, Greiser as the president of the Danzig Senate gave a note to the Polish commissioner, Marjan Chodacki, that complained about the "bad behavior" of the Polish customs officers as proved by the Kalthof incident. In a show of defiance, Beck increased the number of Polish customs officers from 77 to 106.

=== Tientsin incident ===
On 14 June 1939, British attention was distracted from the Danzig crisis by the Tientsin incident when the Japanese Northern China Area Army blockaded the British concession in Tientsin. The Japanese prevented food and fuel from entering the concession, and any British citizen who wished to enter or leave the concession was strip-searched in public at gunpoint by Japanese soldiers. Public opinion in Britain was enraged by the entirely correct newspaper reports of British women being forced to strip in public at bayonet point by Japanese soldiers, and that Japanese officers conducted vaginal searches in public. Chamberlain ordered the Admiralty to give greater attention to a possible war with Japan than to war with Germany. On June 26, 1939, both the Admiralty and the Foreign Office stated in a report to the British cabinet that the only way of forcing the Japanese to cease the blockade was to send the main British battle fleet to Singapore (the main British naval base in Asia), and the Danzig crisis made that militarily unadvisable. Daladier was strongly opposed to the British Mediterranean fleet being sent to Singapore, which he argued was needed to restrain Italy. Chamberlain ordered Sir Robert Craigie, the British ambassador in Tokyo, to find a way to end the Tientsin crisis without too much damage to British prestige, to keep the Royal Navy in European waters.

=== French ambassador to Germany ignored by Bonnet ===
The nature of the Danzig crisis with Germany demanding that the Free City of Danzig, a city that was mostly German to "go home to the Reich" and already under the control of the Nazi Party posed major difficulties for France and Britain. Robert Coulondre, the French ambassador in Berlin, noted in a dispatch to Paris on 21 June 1939:

"The majority of the accredited diplomats in Berlin try to see what could be a compromise solution and are alarmed that they do not. Thus, they are trapped in a sort of contradiction, for the moment one admits, and they admit it, the unlimited nature of German National Socialist demands, then there is no hope of ending them by settling the crisis of Danzig, and consequently there is no advantage of compromising oneself on the subject. On the contrary there are major disadvantages".

On 24 June 1939, Coulondre visited Paris to meet Bonnet. Coulondre charged that Bonnet's equivocal statements to Johannes von Welczeck, the German ambassador in Paris, about what France would do if Germany invaded Poland had convinced Ribbentrop that France would do nothing. Coulondre advised Bonnet to make an unequivocal statement to Welczeck that France would stand by its alliance with Poland if Germany invaded, advice that Bonnet ignored. On 20 June 1939, the former German ambassador to Italy, Count Ulrich von Hassell wrote in his diary: "According to all reports, Ribbentrop is the man who has the most influence with Hitler".

=== July 1939 French and British attempts at ending the crisis ===
Tensions escalated into the Danzig crisis during the summer of 1939. As Bonnet continued to ignore Coulondre's advice on making a firm statement to Welczeck, the ambassador appealed directly to Daladier who ordered Bonnet to make such a statement to Welczeck. On 1 July 1939, Bonnet told Count von Welczeck that Germany should not try to unliterally change the status of Danzig and that France would honor its alliance with Poland. F.M Shepard, the British consul in Danzig, reported that the Danzig Nazis were bringing in arms from Germany and building fortifications in and around the Free City. Shepard reported that the Danzig Nazis had recruited a paramilitary force of about 3,000 men and were turning Danzig into an armed camp. Shepard - a man deeply troubled by the anti-Semitic laws imposed in the Free City in violation of its own constitution - disliked Burckhardt for his failure to protest what Forster and Greiser had done. Burckhardt in turn accused Shepard of suffering some sort of mental breakdown. The Foreign Office tended to downplay Shepard's accurate reports of what was happening in the Free City in favor of Burckhardt's more fanciful reports, which stressed the possibility of a peaceful solution. For an example, Burckhardt claimed that war was unlikely because Hitler was an Austrian and felt a debt of gratitude towards King Jan Sobieski who came to the relief of Vienna in 1683 when the city was besieged by the Ottoman Empire. In July 1939, the British government reluctantly extended its "guarantee" of Poland to the Free City of Danzig, stating that a German attempt to take Danzig would be a casus belli. The British government took a different line from that pursued during the Sudetenland crisis. In 1938, the Reich government had first demanded autonomy for the Sudetenland region and after Prague had conceded the demand for autonomy, had laid claim to the Sudetenland. On 15 March 1939, Germany had occupied the Czech part of Czecho-Slovakia, which had done immense damage to Hitler's claim that he was only trying to undo an "unjust" Treaty of Versailles by bringing all of the ethnic Germans "home to the Reich". The British Foreign Secretary Lord Halifax in July 1939 told Herbert von Dirksen, the German ambassador in London:

“Last year the German government put forward the demand for the Sudetenland on purely racial grounds; but subsequent events proved that this demand was only put forward as a cover for the annihilation of Czechoslovakia. In view of this experience… it is not surprising that the Poles and we ourselves are afraid that the demand for Danzig is only a first move towards the destruction of Poland's independence”.

On 17 July 1939, Helmuth Wohlthat, the deputy head of the Four Year Plan organisation headed by Hermann Göring, arrived in London to attend the meeting of the International Whaling Conference as part of the German delegation. On 18 July 1939, Wohlthat together with Herbert von Dirksen, the German ambassador to the Court of St. James, met with Sir Horace Wilson, the Chief Industrial Adviser and very close friend of Chamberlain to discuss finding a way to end the crisis. In a bizarre intervention, Robert Hudson, an ambitious junior minister who had attended the Wohlthat-Wilson meeting, arrived at the German embassy to propose to Wohlthat and Dirksen his solution to the crisis. Hudson wanted Germany to promise not to invade Poland and to end the Anglo-German arms race in exchange for which a cartel would be created consisting of the major industrialists of Germany, the United Kingdom and the United States to run the development of China, Eastern Europe and Africa; of a loan would be floated in the City of London and on Wall Street that would amount to hundreds of millions of dollars and pounds to go to Germany and a vague plan for the "international governance" of Africa, by which he meant that Germany would be given a role in the ruling of the African colonies of the European nations. Hudson then called an "off-the-record" press conference at his house later the same day to boast about how he supposedly just ended the crisis. The journalists from The Daily Telegraph and the News Chronicle decided to report the story despite Hudson's request to wait for Wohlthat to return to Germany. On 22 July 1939, both The Daily Telegraph and the News Chronicle ran as their frontpage stories that Britain was about to float a loan worth hundreds of millions of pounds sterling to Germany in exchange for the Reich not invading Poland. The British public was outraged by the story and much of the British media labelled Hudson's plan as "paying the Danegeld". In an address to the House of Commons, Chamberlain denied that Britain was about to try to bribe Germany to not invade Poland and stated that Hudson had been acting on his own.

==== Bonnet ignored by Daladier ====
On 18 July 1939, Bonnet met with Daladier to tell him that he believed Hitler was serious about going to war with Poland, and he felt that France should pressure Poland into allowing the Free City of Danzig to "go home to the Reich" as the price of peace. Bonnet also recommended pressuring the Poles into returning the Polish Corridor along with Upper Silesia, neither of which Hitler had demanded. Bonnet favored an international conference and stated that he had discussed the issue with Sir Nevile Henderson, the British ambassador in Berlin, during his visit to Paris. Bonnet presented Henderson's remarks in such a manner as to imply that he was speaking for London. Daladier expressed strong opposition to Bonnet's recommendations as he stated that St. Léger had told him that he was convinced that the Anglo-French-Soviet "peace front" would soon come into existence, and he believed the "peace front" would deter Germany from war. Daladier stated he felt that Hitler was bluffing in his threats and would back down if confronted with overwhelming force. Bonnet was not quite as sanguine as Daladier was about the "peace front". Bonnet stated that the issue of transit rights for the Red Army across Poland still had to be resolved, though he did agree that the "peace front" was the best way of deterring Hitler from war. On 19 July 1939, Daladier wrote to Chamberlain to urge the creation of the "peace front" as soon as possible, which the French premier described as one of the "conditions of peace".

=== SS march through Danzig ===
On 20 July 1939, Gauleiter Forster used the good offers of Burckhardt to meet Chodacki, and afterwards Burckhardt wrote that the matter was settled as nothing would happen in Danzig for the next year or two based on what Forster had told him. However, incidents continued as the SS marched though the streets of Danzig, Polish customs officers continued to be harassed by the Danzig police and another murderous incident occurred where a member of the Danzig SA shot and killed a Polish frontier guard. As expected, Burckhardt passed on a report to the British and French saying that Forster expected nothing in the Free City's status to change for the next two years. At the same time, the British embassy in Berlin received false reports that Hitler was planning to call a conference to be attended by himself, Chamberlain, Daladier, Mussolini, the U.S. president Franklin D. Roosevelt, and the Japanese prime minister Hiranuma Kiichirō to end the crisis peacefully. On 21 July 1939, Coulondre met with Ribbentrop to tell him quite firmly that France would stand by its alliance with Poland.

== The last days of peace ==
=== Conflict between the Danzig Senate and Polish state ===
At the beginning of August 1939, the Senate of the Free City told Warsaw that henceforward the Free City would no longer recognize the authority of Polish customs officers in Danzig, which led Beck in response to warn that the Senate did not have the right to disregard the terms of the Treaty of Versailles and that the German government also did not have the right to speak for Danzig. Much to the chagrin of the British Foreign Office, Warsaw did not consult Britain first when it issued a warning that the Polish Air Force would bomb Danzig if the authority of Polish customs officers continued to be ignored. The Senate backed down while the British who were informed after the fact of the Polish decision to confront the Free City were thrown into panic over the possibility of an armed clash in Danzig plunging Europe into war. Kennard sought in vain for a promise from Colonel Beck that Poland would take no action in Danzig without first obtaining British approval. Beck disliked Kennard and kept him in the dark about what Poland would do if Danzig voted to rejoin Germany, but also about the state of German-Polish relations, much to the vexation of the Foreign Office. On 13 August, three Polish customs inspectors were arrested by the Danzig police after they in turn had arrested the crew of a German fishing boat that had entered Danzig harbor at night without turning on its lights. On 16 August, the Danzig Senate president Greiser invited Chodacki to his house, where he offered a compromise under which if the extra Polish customs officials were withdrawn, the rest could continue their duties without harassment. On 17 August, a Polish frontier guard was shot dead by the Danzig Nazis, leading to the Polish police arresting the gunmen, one of whom shot and killed a Polish policeman while resisting arrest. On 18 August, Greiser had the three arrested Polish customs officers freed, which was taken as a positive sign in Warsaw. Greiser, a völkisch fanatic who regarded Forster as too soft on the Poles was regarded as the more extreme of Danzig's two feuding Nazi leaders and his conciliatory approach was seen as a sign in Warsaw that the crisis was calming down. Beck told Léon Noël, the French ambassador in Warsaw, that he believed that the crisis would be settled peacefully that summer. With the crisis seemingly ending, Beck did not see any need for any concessions.

=== German desire for war and avoidance of negotiation ===
During the crisis, Ribbentrop refused to allow any talks with the Poles as it was always Ribbentrop's great fear that the Poles might actually agree to the Free City returning to Germany, thereby depriving the Reich of its pretext for attacking Poland. However, the German propaganda that all the Reich wanted was to bring Danzig home did have some effect abroad. Years later, in April 1943, when mass graves of the Polish officers massacred by the NKVD in Katyn Wood were discovered, the Canadian Prime Minister William Lyon Mackenzie King wrote in his diary that the massacre and everything else suffered by the Poles in the war was the Poles' own fault for causing the outbreak of the war in 1939 by refusing to give in to Hitler's demand that Danzig be allowed to rejoin Germany. The British historian Victor Rothwell described King's view that the Poles had caused their own suffering as one motivated by spite and his resentment at being pressured by public opinion into declaring war on Germany despite his own inclinations towards neutrality.

At the time, it was widely known that Ribbentrop was the leading hawkish voice in the Reich government who kept pushing for the most extreme solutions to the Danzig crisis. During the summer of 1939, Ribbentrop sabotaged all efforts at a peaceful solution to the Danzig crisis, leading Weinberg to comment that "perhaps Chamberlain's haggard appearance did him more credit than Ribbentrop's beaming smile" as the countdown to a war that would kill millions inexorably gathered pace. The British ambassador in Berlin, Sir Nevile Henderson, invested all of his hopes for peace in Hermann Göring, whom he greatly liked and admired, and who he believed would moderate Hitler into rejecting the bellicose advice of Ribbentrop, a man Henderson greatly hated.

On 11 August 1939, Ribbentrop at his estate outside of Salzburg received as his guests Italian Foreign Minister Count Ciano along with Count Bernardo Attolico, the Italian ambassador in Berlin. During the Salzburg summit both Ciano and Attolico were stunned when Ribbentrop told them that the Danzig issue was only a pretext and that Germany would definitely be going to war against Poland later that month. Speaking in French, the language of diplomacy at the time, Count Ciano asked if there was anything the Italian government could do to prevent the crisis from turning into a war, and was shocked when Ribbentrop replied: "We want war!". Ribbentrop informed Ciano and Attolico of his belief that "the localization of the conflict is certain" and "the probability of victory is infinite". Ciano wrote in his diary that his arguments that Britain and France would declare war if Germany invaded Poland had "niente da fare" ("had no effect") on Ribbentrop who dismissed out of hand any possibility of Britain and France intervening when the invasion of Poland started. On the same day in Paris, Gamelin met with Bonnet to tell him that he thought that war was inevitable and that: "If Russia does not come into the war on our side, we shall not have adequate forces to bring operations against Italy to a rapid conclusion. It is very much in our interest that Italy remain neutral". On 15 August, the Deuxième Bureau reported to Paris the contents of the Salzburg summit, where Ribbentrop's statements that Germany was about to invade Poland were considered highly alarming.

=== Hitler sends the Schleswig-Holstein to Danzig ===
On 14 August 1939 at a conference with his generals, Hitler expressed fear that the Danzig crisis might end the same way as the Sudetenland crisis, saying the last thing he wanted was a Munich-type deal that would allow the Free City to be peacefully returned to Germany. The Treaty of Versailles had stated that the Free City of Danzig was a demilitarised zone, and in violation of the treaty's terms, the paramilitary Landespolizei and the Eberhard Brigade of the Wehrmacht of about 6,500 men were secretly sent into the city. On 15 August 1939, it was announced instead of the cruiser Königsberg, that the old battleship Schleswig-Holstein would visit Danzig for the "friendship" visit. It was felt the guns of the Königsberg were not powerful enough to destroy the Polish base on the Westerplatte and accordingly the guns of a battleship were needed. Starting on 15 August 1939, Henderson sent increasingly frenetic dispatches to the Foreign Secretary, Lord Halifax, demanding that the British government pressure the Poles to make concessions to the Germans. On 18 August 1939, the SS-led Heimwehr (Home Guard), which was mostly made up of teenagers from the Hitler Youth, took part in a public parade, during which guns were provocatively displayed while members of the Polish and Jewish minorities were threatened with violence. On the same day, Halifax ordered Kennard to see Colonel Beck and apply pressure on him to make concessions. Beck in turn replied that it was impossible to negotiate with the Germans, who refused to see any Polish officials.

=== Beck's last attempts at peaceful settlement ===
In the middle of August 1939, Beck offered a concession, saying that Poland was willing to give up its control of Danzig's customs, a proposal which caused fury in Berlin. However, the leaders of the Free City sent a message to Berlin on 19 August saying: "Gauleiter Forster intends to extend claims... Should the Poles yield again it is intended to increase the claims further in order to make accord impossible". The same day a telegram from Berlin expressed approval with the proviso: "Discussions will have to be conducted and pressure exerted against Poland in such a way that responsibility for failure to come to an agreement and the consequences rest with Poland".

On 19 August, Beck ordered Lipski to see Hermann Göring, who was regarded as being the most moderate of the Nazi leaders. During the crisis Göring played the role of the "soft man", the supposed voice of reason in the Nazi leadership while Ribbentrop played the role of the "hard man", the obstinate extremist who was forever encouraging Hitler to take drastic steps. The differences presented to foreign diplomats between Göring and Ribbentrop in the crisis, though based partly on the genuine mutual detestation that the two men held for each other, was part of a stratagem by Hitler to confuse foreign leaders and make it appear that a peaceful resolution was still possible. Göring privately presented himself to Lipski as a man opposed to war and in a cunning stratagem invited Lipski to make a lengthy visit to his Karinhall estate in October to discuss the crisis, thereby giving the impression that there was still time until October to avoid war. As commander-in-chief of the Luftwaffe, Göring knew very well that Y Day (the date chosen for the invasion) was 26 August. On 21 August, Lipski visited Warsaw to ask Beck what he should say when he made the expected visit to Karinhall in October. During his visit, Lipski discovered that Beck was very self-confident that Poland would defeat Germany if it came to war. Beck told Lipski that when he made his visit in October that he should tell Göring that there would be no benefits if it came to war and that Poland would not allow itself to be bullied.

=== Hitler's 22 August speech to generals ===
On 22 August 1939, Hitler in a secret speech at Berchtesgaden to his generals, stated: "It was clear to me that a conflict with Poland had to come sooner or later. I had already made the decision in the spring, but I thought I would turn against the West in a few years, and only afterwards against the East. But the sequence could not be fixed. One cannot close one's eyes before a threatening situation. I wanted to establish an acceptable relationship with Poland to fight first against the West. But this plan, which was agreeable to me, could not be executed since the essential points had changed. It became clear to me that Poland would attack us in case of conflict with the West". Weinberg wrote that the extremely anti-Polish Wehrmacht generals were very keen on a war against Poland, but less so on Hitler's plans for another war with Great Britain, which led him to argue that the speech was a "reasonably accurate reflection" of Hitler's thinking. In his speech, Hitler gave as his major issues with Poland the unwillingness to renounce the Franco-Polish alliance and sign the Anti-Comintern pact, which Hitler described as the basis for "an acceptable relationship". In his speech to the Wehrmacht generals, Hitler declared his contempt for "weak values" such as compassion and kindness as he stated once the war begins that his officers should "close your hearts to pity. Act brutally". Later the same night, Hitler was at the Berghof when he received the news of the Molotov-Ribbentrop pact. That night, the sky above the Berghof was lit up by the aurora borealis, which took on a bright red hue. Albert Speer who was present at the Berghof that night remembered: "Northern lights of unusual intensity threw red light on the legend-haunted Untersberg across the valley while the sky above shimmered in all the colors of the rainbow. The last act of Götterdämmerung could not have been more effectively staged. The same red light bathed our faces and hands". Hitler stood on the terrace of the Berghof as he looked at the red sky and commented: "Looks like a great deal of blood. This time, we won't bring it off without violence".

=== Danzig Senate votes to rejoin Germany ===
On 23 August 1939, Albert Forster, the Gauleiter of Danzig, called a meeting of the Senate that voted to have the Free City rejoin Germany, raising tensions to the breaking point. At the same meeting, Forster announced that the Free City of Danzig was no longer under the authority of the League of Nations. The same meeting appointed Forster the Danzig State President while Greiser was proclaimed minister president. Both the appointment of Forster as State President and the resolution calling for the Free City to rejoin the Reich were violations of the charter the League of Nations had given Danzig in 1920, and the matter should have been taken to the Council of the League of Nations for discussion. Across the Baltic Sea in Kiel, also on 23 August, the Schleswig-Holstein took on board a naval assault group and set sail for Danzig. Bonnet along with his fellow appeaser Camille Chautemps (whom Daladier dismissed as "the peace-at-any-price-brigade") used the news of the Molotov-Ribbentrop pact to demand a meeting with the service chiefs, which took place on 23 August. Both Bonnet and Chautemps demanded that the service chiefs say that France was unready for war, but led by Gamelin were instead told by the service chiefs that France could risk war. Gamelin stated that it would take Germany between three and six months to defeat Poland, which led him to predict that the earliest the Reich could turn west would be in the spring of 1940.

=== League of Nations representative Burckhardt dismissed by Nazis ===
On 24 August 1939, Greiser told Burckhardt that he no longer had any authority over the Free City while the news was broken to the world media by a press release from the DNB news agency in Berlin. At noon of the same day, the Poles were confronted with a demand for the removal of all Polish frontier officials and a 50% reduction in the number of Polish customs inspectors working the Danzig harbor. In a further provocation, Forster had the chief of the Polish railroad administration arrested and briefly closed by force the Polish customs office. In Warsaw, the French ambassador Léon Noël had a meeting with Colonel Beck and Marshal Rydz-Smigly where he practically begged the Poles not to respond to these provocations by sending troops into the Free City. The Germans expected the Poles to react to these violations of the Treaty of Versailles by sending troops into Danzig, but Beck limited himself to making only a diplomatic protest. On 25 August, the Schleswig-Holstein anchored in Danzig harbour and aimed its guns menacingly at the Polish positions on the Westerplatte.

Since these violations of the Danzig charter would have resulted in the League deposing Danzig's Nazi government, both the French and the British prevented the matter from being referred to the Council of the League of Nations. Instead, the British and French applied strong pressure on the Poles not to send in a military force to depose the Danzig government, and to instead appoint a mediator to resolve the crisis. By late August 1939, the crisis continued to escalate with the Senate confiscating on 27 August stocks of wheat, salt and petrol that belonged to Polish businesses that were in the process of being exported or imported via the Free City, an action that led to sharp Polish complaints. The same day, 200 Polish workers at the Danzig shipyards were fired without severance pay and had their identification papers revoked, meaning that they legally could not live in Danzig anymore. The Danzig government imposed food rationing, the Danzig newspapers took a militantly anti-Polish line, and almost every day there were "incidents" on the border with Poland. Ordinary people in Danzig were described as being highly worried in the last days of August 1939 as it became apparent that war was imminent.

=== 26 August – some Wehrmacht units accidentally invade early ===
On 24 August, Lipski finally saw Göring and asked him to use his influence to persuade Hitler to abandon all idea of war to end the crisis. Göring, who knew that Y Day was 26 August was not as sympathetic as Lipski had expected and instead blamed Britain for the crisis as he argued it as the British "guarantee" of Poland that caused matters to escalate. Fall Weiss had been planned for 26 August 1939, but the fact that Britain and France had failed to abandon Poland led Hitler to halt the invasion of Poland and push the invasion date back to 1 September to give Ribbentrop more time to sever Britain and France from Poland. Hitler's orders to postpone Fall Weiss for another week did not reach all of the Wehrmacht forces in time. On the morning of 26 August 1939, a number of Wehrmacht units crossed into Poland, where they engaged in much bloody fighting before retiring back into the Reich the same morning when they received word of Fall Weiss's postponement. Coulondre took the news that there had been fighting along the Polish-German frontier alongside the sudden withdrawal of the Wehrmacht as evidence that French deterrence diplomacy was having its effect. On the evening of 27 August 1939, Coulondre wrote a letter to the French Premier Édouard Daladier declaring: "One must hold firm, Hitler faced with force is a man who will climb down".

=== Chamberlain 27 August letter to Hitler ===
On 27 August 1939, Chamberlain sent a letter to Hitler, which was intended to counteract reports that he had heard from intelligence sources that Ribbentrop had convinced Hitler that the Molotov-Ribbentrop Pact would ensure that Britain would abandon Poland. In his letter to Hitler, Chamberlain wrote:

"Whatever may prove to be the nature of the German-Soviet Agreement, it cannot alter Great Britain's obligation to Poland which His Majesty's Government have stated in public repeatedly and plainly and which they are determined to fulfill.

It has been alleged that, if His Majesty's Government had made their position more clear in 1914, the great catastrophe would have been avoided. Whether or not there is any force in that allegation, His Majesty's Government are resolved that on this occasion there shall be no such tragic misunderstanding.

If the case should arise, they are resolved, and prepared, to employ without delay all the forces at their command, and it is impossible to foresee the end of hostilities once engaged. It would be a dangerous illusion to think that, if war once starts, it will come to an early end even if a success on any one of the several fronts on which it will be engaged should have been secured".

=== Burckhardt held at gunpoint ===
On 30 August 1939, Forster led a group of Nazis that kicked in the door to Burckhardt's house and told Burckhardt at gunpoint that he had only two hours to leave Danzig or else he would be executed. Forster stated to Burckhart that the swastika would fly over Danzig as the Free City was going to "go home to the Reich in the next day or two, and he already arrested all of the Polish commissioners. Forster assured Burckhardt that despite the way Forster was pointing his gun at him: "Personally, I have nothing against you". On 28 August 1939, Hitler stated that Fall Weiss was to begin on the morning of 1 September, but gave himself an extra day to sever Britain and France from Poland with the Wehrmacht generals to be informed no later than 3:00 pm on 31 August about the date to start the war. Weinberg wrote: "Very revealing, and sometimes overlooked in the literature on the subject, is the fact not only that Hitler held to the 1 September date rather than allow the additional day of negotiations his own schedule permitted, but that in the event he could see no reason even to await his 3:00 pm deadline on the 31st". Shortly after noon on 31 August 1939, Hitler signed the orders for Fall Weiss to begin the next day.

=== Final pre-war French cabinet meeting ===
At a crucial meeting of the French cabinet on the evening of 31 August 1939, Bonnet sought to use the idea of a peace conference to be hosted by Benito Mussolini as a pretext for ending the alliance with Poland. Before the cabinet meeting opened, Bonnet along with his close ally, the Public Works Minister, Anatole de Monzie, sought to pressure some of the more hesitant hawks in the Cabinet such as Charles Pomaret, Henri Queuille and Jean Zay, into endorsing the conference to be hosted by Mussolini. Zay was clearly torn as he stated that he dreaded the idea of another world war and stated he was willing to support Mussolini's conference provided it was "not a new Munich". As the cabinet meeting opened, Bonnet was described as self-confident and self-assured. In a memo to Daladier, St. Léger wrote that the Italian peace conference was an elaborate Axis trick to prevent France and Britain from declaring war as he wrote:

"If such negotiations were to be started by a retreat on the part of the Allies and under the threat of German force, the democracies would soon find themselves faced with wholly unacceptable Axis terms. There would be war anyway and under especially unfavorable conditions. No, the trap is too obvious".

As the cabinet meeting opened, Daladier would not speak to Bonnet as a way of showing he was against the munichois policy advocated by Bonnet. At the cabinet meeting, Bonnet was the leading spokesman for the idea of using the peace mediation proposals of Mussolini as a pretext for ending the alliance with Poland but was overruled by the majority French cabinet led by Daladier. One who was present wrote that Daladier "bristled like a hedgehog. He turned his back on Bonnet from the first minute. His expression was one of contemptuous disgust". Daladier read out to the cabinet Coulondre's letter which he had received two days previously in which Coulondre wrote: "The trial of strength turns to our advantage. It is only necessary to hold, hold, hold!" St. Léger had not shown Coulondre's letter to Bonnet while he handed it over to Daladier. Bonnet was taken quite by surprise by Coulondre's letter and was left enraged as Coulondre's letter won over the cabinet for Daladier's policy, all the more so as he had been blindsided by a letter whose existence he had been unaware of until the cabinet meeting.

=== World War II begins ===
On the morning of 1 September 1939 at 4:45 am the Schleswig-Holstein fired the first shots of World War Two by blasting volley after volley of its 11-inch guns on the Westerplatte. Shortly afterwards, the cities of Wilno, Łódź, Grodno, Katowice, Krakow and Brest-Litovsk were bombed by the Luftwaffe while the Wehrmacht crossed the border into Poland. At 9 am that morning, the Luftwaffe bombed Warsaw for the first time.
