= Warsaw Accord =

1922 treaty

The Warsaw Accord was an accord signed on 17 March 1922 by Finland, Poland, Estonia, and Latvia. The Finnish Parliament's failure to ratify it prevented it from entering into force.

== Accord summary ==
The states agreed not to enter any other treaties to disadvantage of other members (Article 2), to communicate the other treaties to each other (Article 3), to resolve their disputes peacefully (Article 6), and to observe neutrality in case of an unprovoked attack on one of the signatories (Article 7).

Of other issues, Article 1 stipulated reciprocal recognition of their treaties with (Soviet) Russia, Article 6 urged for conclusion of administrative and economic treaties, wherever missing, and Article 5 called for the guarantees of the rights of ethnic minorities. Article 8 set the validity term of 5 years, afterwards automatically extendable annually unless denunciated in advance.

== History ==
Poland under Józef Piłsudski aspired for creating its own sphere of influence in the Baltics, leaving Estonia under the influence of Finland, while getting Latvia and Lithuania under the Polish one. Moreover, Piłsudski envisioned a grand Eastern European federation (Intermarium). However, the bitter dispute of Poland and Lithuania over the Vilnius Region was a major stumbling block. Therefore, Lithuania did not participate in the accord and even actively opposed it. That made an alliance with Poland less attractive to Latvia and Estonia.

Finnish Minister of Foreign Affairs Rudolf Holsti failed to get the accord ratified by the parliament and was served a vote of no confidence. That reflected a growing sentiment that Finland should align with either Germany, or the rest of Scandinavia instead of creating alliances with the Baltic states.

The resulting accord was the extent of Polish success in creating a Baltic bloc.
