= Marian Kamil Dziewanowski =

Polish-American historian (1913–2005)

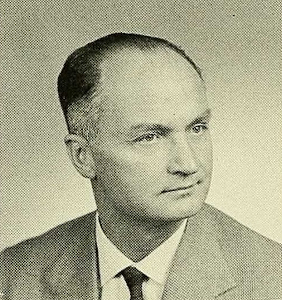
- M. Kamil Dziewanowski, Ph.D., circa 1960
- Born: June 27, 1913
- Died: February 18, 2005 (aged 91)
- Occupation: Historian
- Writing career
- Subjects: European history; Polish history; Russian history

Marian Kamil Dziewanowski (27 June 1913, Zhytomyr – 18 February 2005, Milwaukee, Wisconsin) was a historian of Poland, Russia and modern Europe.

== Life ==
Born in Zhytomir, Russian Empire (now Ukraine), Dziewanowski was the son of Kamil and Zofia (Kamieńska) Dziewanowski. He grew up and studied in interwar Poland at the Jagiellonian University in Kraków. In 1937–39 he was a foreign correspondent in Berlin, covering the Anschluss with Austria, the Munich Conference, and the German occupation of the Sudetenland.

During the German invasion of Poland, Dziewanowski served as a Polish cavalry platoon leader. Later he served in England as an instructor/interpreter at a school for paratroopers and saboteurs, as an editor of a secret radio station working with the resistance in Poland, as a BBC News commentator, and, in Washington, as an aide to the Polish military attache. While in Britain, he married Ada Karczewska in 1946. After the war, he chose to remain in exile rather than return to communist Poland.

He moved to the United States, where at Harvard University he earned one of the first postwar doctorates in Russian and East European history. The topic of his dissertation was "Genealogy of a Party: Origins and Beginnings of the Communist Party of Poland," and it was supervised by Michael Karpovich. It was later revised and published by Harvard University Press as Communist Party of Poland: An Outline History (1959; 2nd ed., 1976). Dziewanowski taught at Boston College from 1954 to 1965, and then at Boston University from 1965 to 1979, where he attained the rank of professor. From 1979 to 1984 he taught at the University of Wisconsin–Milwaukee.

Dziewanowski authored the most popular articles and books on 19th- and 20th-century Polish and Russian history. He wrote important works on the political ideas of Józef Piłsudski, the most prominent Polish politician of the interbellum, and of the great 19th-century Polish and Russian politician, Prince Adam Jerzy Czartoryski.

He was a member of the Polish Academy of Learning, headquartered in Kraków.

== Works ==
- Russia in the Twentieth Century
- Poland in the Twentieth Century
- A History of Soviet Russia and Its Aftermath
- War At Any Price: World War II In Europe, 1939-1945
- Communist Party of Poland: An Outline History
- Alexander I: Russia's Mysterious Tsar
- The Revolution of 1904-1905 and the Marxist Movement of Poland
- Pilsudski's Federal Policy, 1919-1921
- Joseph Pilsudski: A European Federalist, 1918-1922
- Czartoryski and His Essai sur la diplomatie

== See also ==
- List of Poles
