= Gwiazda Polarna =

- Type: Biweekly newspaper
- Editor-in-chief: Jacek Hilgier
- Founded: 1908
- Language: Polish
- Headquarters: Stevens Point, Wisconsin
- ISSN: 0740-5944
- Website: gwiazdapolarna.net

Gwiazda Polarna (Polish for "Pole Star") is "America's oldest independent Polish-language newspaper." It has been published since 1908 in Stevens Point, Wisconsin.

== History ==
Gwiazda Polarna's name appears to have arisen from an English-language play on the word "Pole," which refers to a Polish person and also appears in the name of the Pole Star (in Polish, "gwiazda polarna").

The newspaper was founded in 1908.

== Editors and writers ==
As of 2011 Gwiazda's publisher and editor-in-chief is Jacek Hilgier. Previous editors-in-chief have been (in alphabetical order) Adam Bartosz, Edward Dusza, Alfons Hering (1978-1985), Paweł Klimowicz, Franciszek Kmietowicz, Małgorzata Terentiew-Ćwiklińska, Leszek Zieliński.

Gwiazda's writers and editors have included (in alphabetical order) Józef A. Białasiewicz, Stanisław Brudnicki, Zbigniew Celanowski, Zbigniew Chałko, Cezary Chlebowski, Ludwika Czerska, Jan Fryling, Wiesław Horabik, Waclaw Iwak, Aleksander Janta-Połczynski, Tadeusz Katelbach, Mirosław Kruszewska, Szymon Laks, Józef Mackiewicz, Wojciech Płazak, Bolesław Prus, Zbigniew Rabsztyn, Tadeusz Samulak, Leszek Szymański, Adam Tomaszewski, Barbara Toporska, Wojciech A. Wierzewski.

== Present ==
Gwiazda Polarna is a general-interest newspaper dealing with current world events, Polish-American affairs, American history and culture, Polish history and culture, and human history and cultures. Gwiazda Polarna is published biweekly by Point Publications, Inc., with Library of Congress ISSN 0740-5944.

The newspaper's editorial and business office is at 2804 Post Road, Stevens Point, WI
