= Border states =

Border states may refer to:

- Limitrophe states, states bordering a given country, e.g. Russia
- Border states (American Civil War), the five slave states that remained in the Union during the American Civil War (Delaware, Maryland, Kentucky, Missouri, and from 1863, West Virginia)
- Border States Electric Supply, an electrical distributor in the construction, industrial, and utility industries, headquartered in Fargo, North Dakota.
- Border states (Eastern Europe), the newly independent countries (or "states") bordering the Soviet Union during the interwar period
- International border states of the United States, U.S. states that border another country
