= Baltic states =

Three countries east of the Baltic Sea

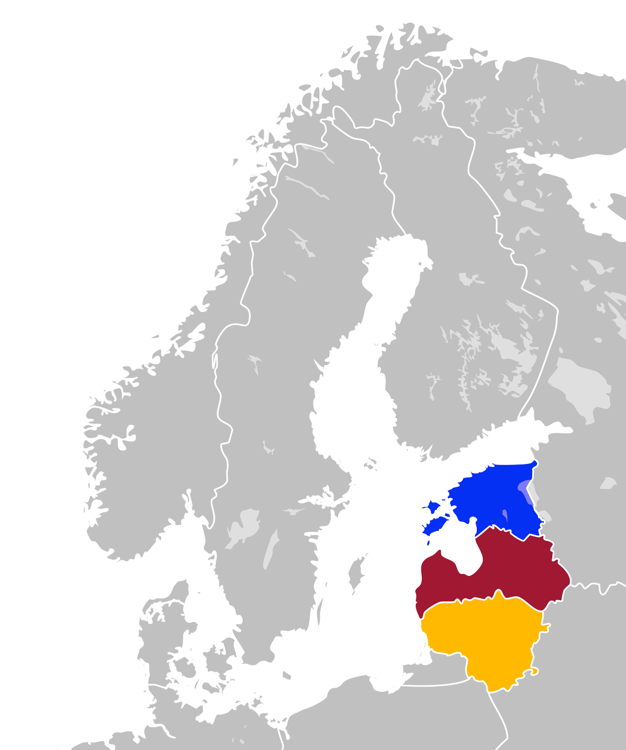
- Countries: Estonia (blue); Latvia (maroon); Lithuania (gold)
- Time zones: UTC+02:00 (EET); UTC+03:00 (EEST)

The Baltic states (Note: Lithuanian: Baltijos valstybės; Latvian: Baltijas valstis; Estonian: Balti riigid) or the Baltic countries is a geopolitical term encompassing Estonia, Latvia, and Lithuania. All three countries are members of NATO, the European Union, the Eurozone, the Baltic Assembly, and the OECD. The three sovereign states on the eastern coast of the Baltic Sea are sometimes referred to as the "Baltic nations", less often and in historical circumstances also as the "Baltic republics", the "Baltic lands", or simply the Baltics.

The region was inhabited by various peoples including the Baltic tribes between antiquity, Christianization, and Middle Ages but they have been subjugated by various foreign rules before their colonizations by the Russian and German Empires respectively. Near the end of World War I in 1918, all three Baltic states became independent countries but their sovereignty was interrupted by the start of World War II when the Soviet Union at first, began to occupy and annex all three Baltic states in 1940, followed by Nazi Germany in 1941, then re-occupation by the Soviets in 1944 where they then faced isolation from the outside world. In 1989, during the anti-communist upheavals in Eastern Europe, the Baltic states struggled to regain their independence from Soviet domination, which culminated in their restorations of independence in 1991 when the Soviet Union disintegrated.

Since their restorations of independence, all three Baltic countries are classified as high-income economies by the World Bank and maintain a very high Human Development Index. The three governments engage in intergovernmental and parliamentary cooperation. There is also frequent cooperation in foreign and security policy, defence, energy, and transportation.

== Etymology ==
The term Baltic stems from the name of the Baltic Sea – a hydronym dating back to at least 3rd century B.C. (when Eratosthenes mentioned Baltia in an Ancient Greek text) and possibly earlier. There are several theories about its origin, most of which trace it to the reconstructed Proto-Indo-European root *bhel meaning 'white, fair'. This meaning is retained in the two modern Baltic languages, where baltas in Lithuanian and balts in Latvian mean "white". However, the modern names of the region and the sea that originate from this root, were not used in either of the two languages prior to the 19th century.

Since the Middle Ages, the Baltic Sea has appeared on maps in Germanic languages as the equivalent of 'East Sea': German: Ostsee, Danish: Østersøen, Dutch: Oostzee, Swedish: Östersjön, etc. Indeed, the sea lies mostly to the east of Germany, Denmark, Norway, and Sweden. The term was also used historically to refer to the overseas provinces of Sweden (Swedish: Östersjöprovinserna) and, subsequently, the Baltic governorates of the Russian Empire (Russian: Остзейские губернии, romanized: Ostzejskie gubernii). Terms related to modern name Baltic appear in ancient texts, but had fallen into disuse until reappearing as the adjective Baltisch in German, from which it was adopted in other languages. During the 19th century, Baltic started to supersede Ostsee as the name for the region. This change was a result of the Baltic German elite adopting terms derived from Baltisch to refer to themselves. Its Russian derivative Pribaltiyskiy (Прибалтийский) was first used in 1859.

The term Baltic countries or Baltic Sea countries has also sometimes been used in the context of countries neighbouring the Baltic Sea, the Baltic Region, including prior to 20th century. After World War I, the new sovereign states that emerged on the east coast of the Baltic Sea – Estonia, Latvia, Lithuania, and Finland – became known as the Baltic states. Since World War II, the term has been used to group the three countries Estonia, Latvia, and Lithuania.

== History ==
=== History before the 20th century ===
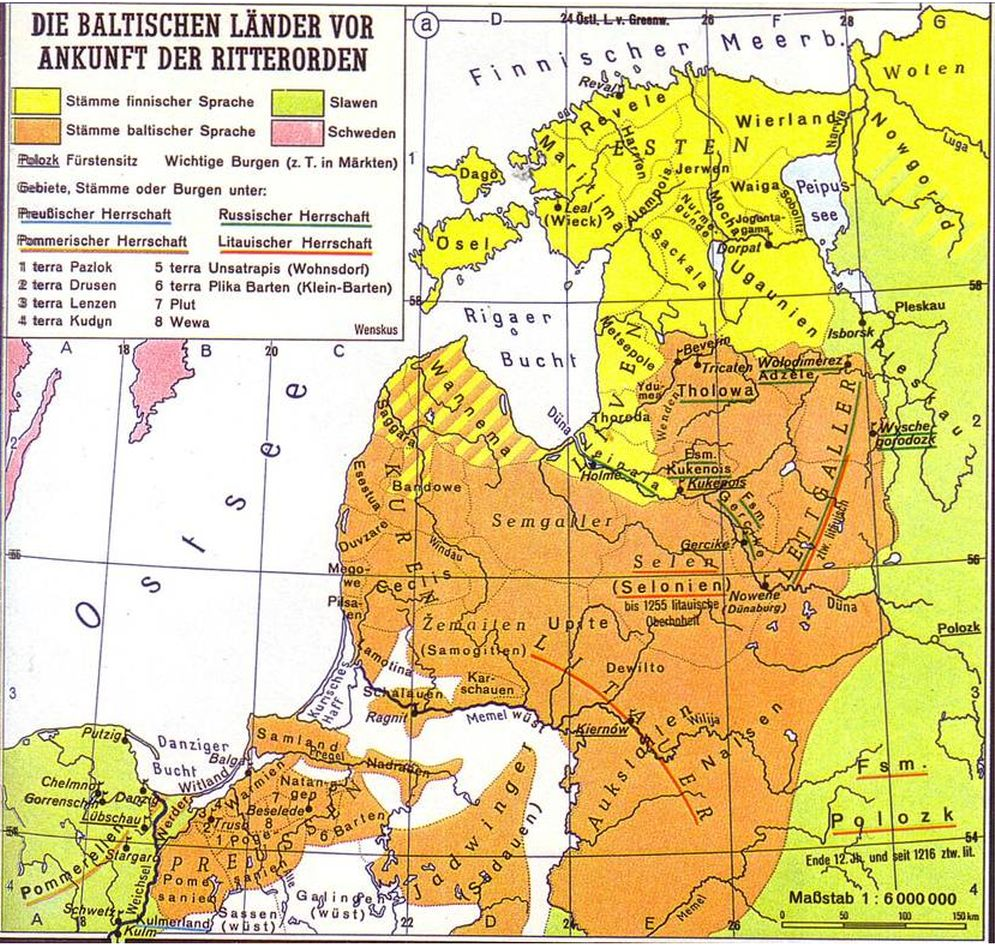
Baltic lands before the invasion of Catholic crusaders, c. 1202. Baltic-speaking peoples are marked in orange, Finnic-speaking peoples in yellow.

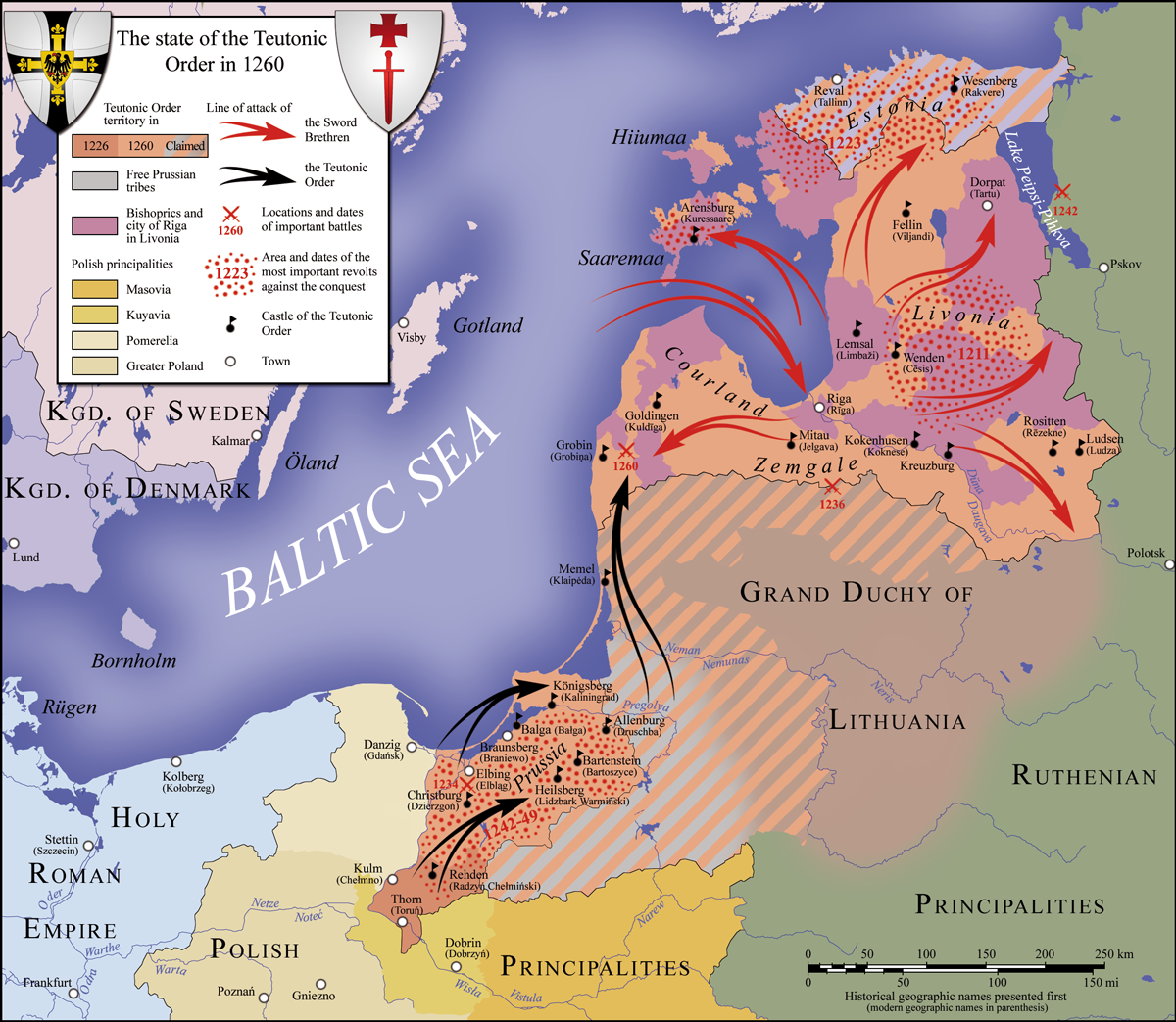
Northern Crusades in 1200s

Although the modern Baltic states – Estonia, Latvia, and Lithuania – share a geographical region and certain historical experiences, their pre-modern paths diverged sharply. Geography, ethnic composition, and the sequence of foreign conquests all shaped distinct political and cultural developments.

From the early Middle Ages, the territories of present-day Estonia and Latvia were inhabited by a mosaic of Finnic and Baltic tribal societies, including the Estonians, Livs, Curonians, Semigallians, Latgalians, and Selonians. Farther south, in the lands that would later form Lithuania, related Baltic tribes such as the Lithuanians, Samogitians, Yotvingians, and Skalvians inhabited the region's forests and river valleys. These groups shared linguistic and cultural ties with their northern neighbours but developed distinct local identities and systems of governance. Their settlements, typically fortified hillforts surrounded by agricultural lands, served as both defensive centers and hubs of trade connecting the Baltic coast to inland routes leading toward Rus' and central Europe.

In the 12th and 13th centuries, the northern and western parts of the region – modern Estonia and Latvia – became targets of Christianization and conquest. German crusaders, supported by papal sanction and local bishoprics, launched the Livonian Crusade to subdue the pagan populations. The Livonian Brothers of the Sword, later absorbed into the Teutonic Order, established a series of strongholds and ecclesiastical territories that brought Estonia and much of Latvia under foreign domination. These crusading states introduced Western feudal structures, imposed Christianity, and subordinated native peoples within a hierarchy led by German military and clerical elites. Urban centers such as Riga, Tallinn (Reval), and Cēsis (Wenden) grew under German law and became prosperous members of the Hanseatic League, facilitating trade in grain, furs, timber, and wax between the Baltic and western Europe. However, political power remained concentrated in the hands of German-speaking landowners and clergy. The indigenous Estonian and Latvian populations were largely reduced to serfdom, forming a rural majority excluded from civic governance.

Lithuania followed a markedly different course. The Lithuanian tribes, situated further inland and less accessible to seaborne crusaders, remained outside the control of the Livonian and Teutonic Orders. Their inland position, fragmented political structure, and ability to mount coordinated resistance allowed them to avoid subjugation and later unite under native leadership. In the 13th century, these tribes coalesced under native rulers, most notably Mindaugas, who was crowned king in 1253 and established the Grand Duchy of Lithuania. Unlike its northern neighbours, which were absorbed into foreign feudal systems, Lithuania retained its indigenous leadership and gradually consolidated a centralized authority. Through a combination of military campaigns, strategic marriages, and pragmatic alliances, the Grand Duchy expanded rapidly during the 14th and 15th centuries, extending over much of present-day Belarus, Ukraine, and parts of western Russia. This expansion brought together diverse peoples and faiths under Lithuanian rule, creating one of the largest and most multi-ethnic states in medieval Europe. The ruling elite adopted aspects of Western and Eastern political traditions, maintaining their native faith longer than most of Europe before the official Christianization of Lithuania in 1387 under Grand Duke Jogaila.

As Lithuania grew, it entered into a close dynastic relationship with Poland through Jogaila’s marriage to Queen Jadwiga, leading to the Polish–Lithuanian union. While this partnership increased Lithuania's influence in central and eastern Europe, it also gradually integrated it into the political orbit of Poland. Nevertheless, Lithuania preserved its own institutions – its code of laws, administrative structures, and language of governance – long after the formal establishment of the Polish–Lithuanian Commonwealth in 1569. During the 16th and 17th centuries, the Commonwealth became a major power in central and eastern Europe, repelling Muscovite advances and influencing affairs across the region. However, the political liberties of the nobility and the growing power of magnate families gradually weakened central authority, leaving the state vulnerable to internal factionalism and external pressure.

Meanwhile, Estonia and parts of Latvia experienced alternating control among Denmark, Sweden, and Poland–Lithuania before gradually falling under Swedish and later Russian rule. Swedish administration in the 17th century brought significant changes, including attempts at land reform, greater centralization, and the introduction of compulsory education and Lutheran parish schools, which had a lasting cultural impact. Riga and Tallinn became key cities of the Swedish Baltic dominion until the Great Northern War (1700–1721), after which Russian forces secured the region. Despite these shifts in sovereignty, the Baltic German nobility maintained their privileges across successive regimes, ensuring continuity in local governance and landownership.

The outcome of the Great Northern War brought Estonia and most of Latvia under the Russian Empire rule, while the partitions of the Polish–Lithuanian Commonwealth (1772–1795) ended Lithuania's independence as well. By the 19th century, all three Baltic lands were incorporated into the Russian Empire, though social structures differed – the Baltic provinces of Estonia and Latvia retained influential German landowners and slight autonomy, whereas Lithuania was more integrated into the empire and subjected to attempted Russification policies alongside Poland due to repeated uprisings.

Despite these differences, each region experienced the stirrings of national revival in the 19th century, as Estonians, Latvians, and Lithuanians sought to preserve their languages and cultures within imperial frameworks – laying the groundwork for the eventual emergence of modern national states in the 20th century.

=== Independent countries 1918–1940 ===
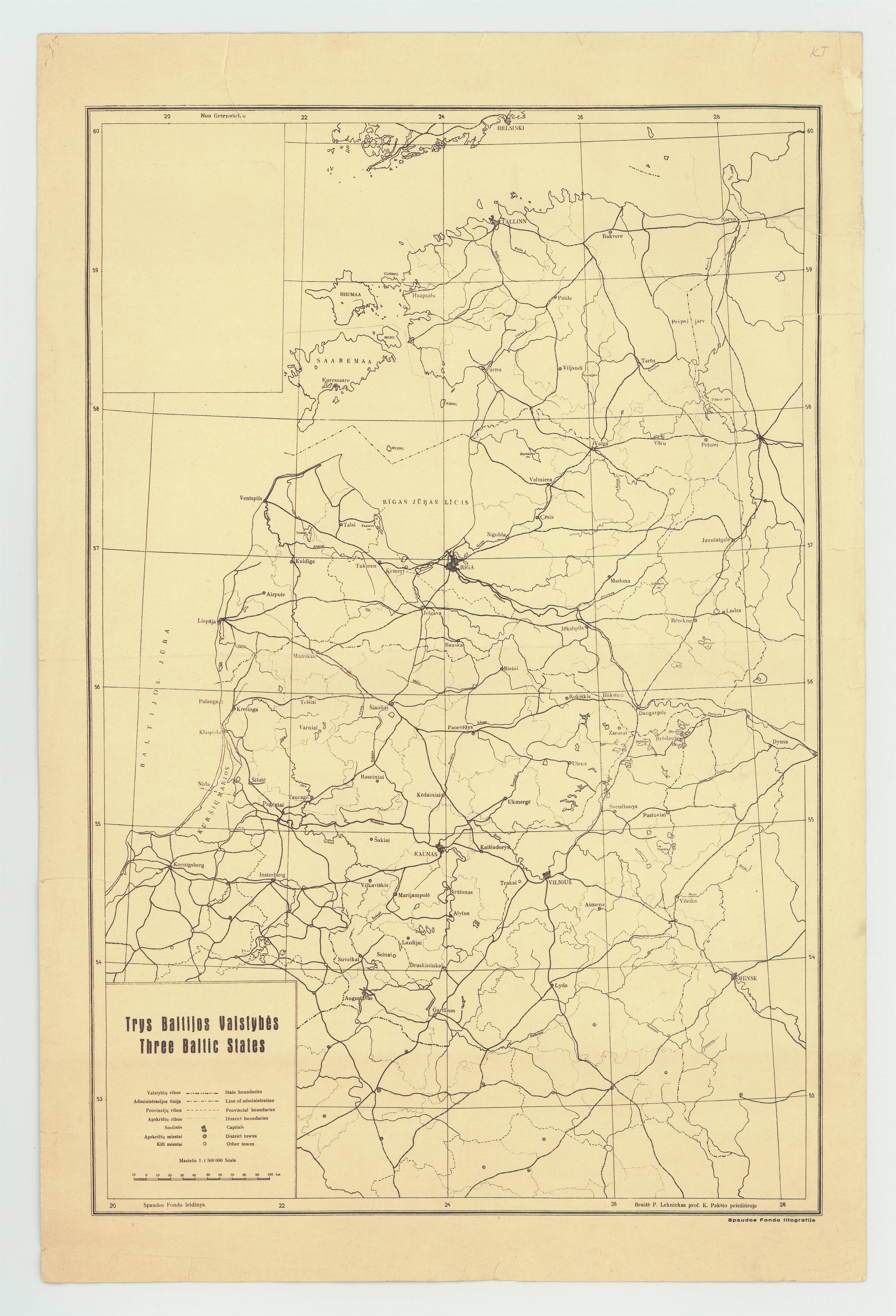
The international boundaries of Estonia, Latvia and Lithuania in 1935

As World War I came to a close, Lithuania declared independence and Latvia formed a provisional government. Estonia had already obtained autonomy from Russia after the 1917 February Revolution, and declared independence in February 1918, but was subsequently occupied by the German Empire until November 1918. Estonia fought a successful war of independence against Soviet Russia in 1918–1920. Latvia and Lithuania followed a similar process, until the completion of the Latvian War of Independence and Lithuanian Wars of Independence in 1920.

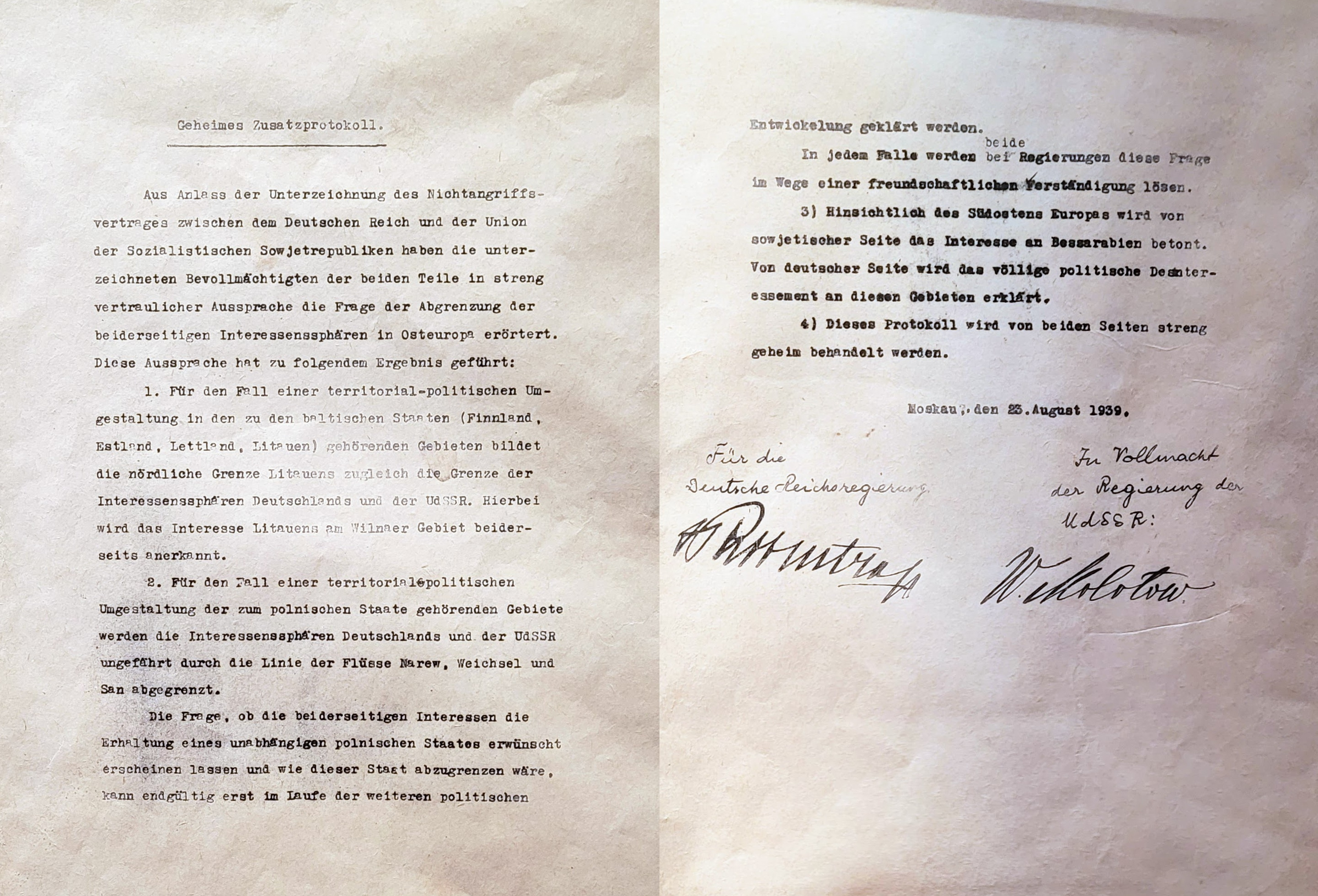
According to the 1939 Molotov–Ribbentrop Pact, "the Baltic states (Finland, Estonia, Latvia, Lithuania)" were divided into German and Soviet "spheres of influence" (German copy).

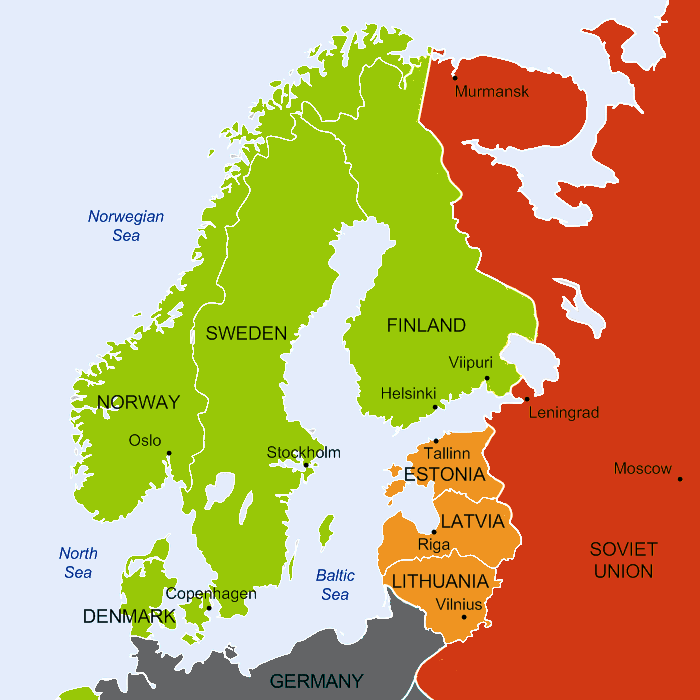
Geopolitical status in Northern Europe in November 1939: Neutral countries Germany and annexed countries Soviet Union and annexed countries Neutral countries with military bases established by Soviet Union in October 1939

During the interwar period the three countries as well as Finland and Poland were sometimes collectively referred to as limitrophe states (from French language), as they together formed a "rim" along the western border of Soviet Russia and the Soviet Union. They were also part of what Georges Clemenceau considered a strategic cordon sanitaire, the entire territory from Finland in the north to Romania in the south, between Western and Central Europe and potential Bolshevik territorial ambitions.

All three Baltic countries experienced a period of general stability and rapid economic growth of the period (even if brief), some commenters avoid the label "authoritarian"; others, however, condemn such an "apologetic" attitude, for example in later assessments of Kārlis Ulmanis.

=== Soviet and German occupations, 1940–1991 ===
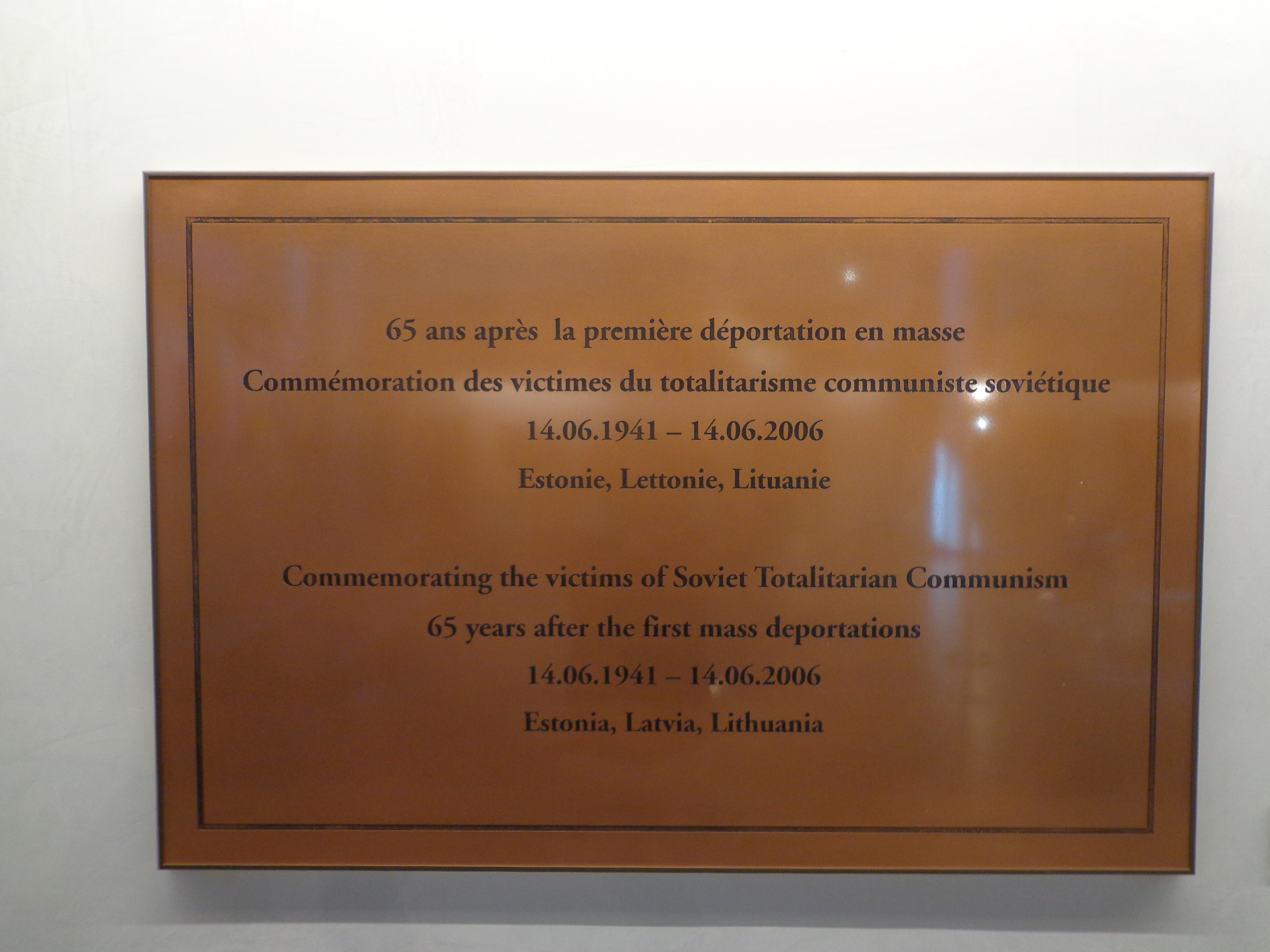
Memorial plaque to the Baltic victims of the Soviets (Strasbourg, main building of the European Parliament)

In accordance with a secret protocol within the Molotov–Ribbentrop Pact of 1939 that divided Europe into German and Soviet spheres of influence, the Soviet army invaded eastern Poland in September 1939, and the Stalinist Soviet government coerced Estonia, Latvia, and Lithuania into "mutual assistance treaties" which granted USSR the right to establish military bases in these countries. In June 1940, the Soviet army invaded and occupied the entire territory of Estonia, Latvia, and Lithuania, and installed new, pro-Soviet puppet governments. In all three countries simultaneously, rigged elections (in which only pro-Stalin candidates were allowed to run) were staged in July 1940, the newly assembled parliaments in each of the three countries then unanimously applied to join the Soviet Union, and in August 1940 were incorporated into the USSR as the Estonian SSR, Latvian SSR, and Lithuanian SSR.

The June 1940 Soviet invasion of the Baltics was immediately followed by mass repressions, including arrests, executions, and mass deportations by the new Soviet totalitarian regime. The Stalinist central government in Moscow attempted to Sovietize its occupied territories. Between 1940 and 1953, the Soviet central government deported more than 200,000 people from the Baltics to remote locations in the Soviet Union. In addition, at least 75,000 were sent to Gulags. About 10% of the adult Baltic population was deported or sent to labor camps. (See June deportation, Soviet deportations from Estonia, Sovietization of the Baltic states)

The Soviet occupation of the Baltic countries was interrupted by Nazi German invasion of the region in 1941. Initially, many Estonians, Latvians, and Lithuanians considered the German army as liberators, while having hoped for the restoration of each of the three countries' independence, but instead the Nazi German invaders established a civil administration, known as the Reichskommissariat Ostland. During the occupation the Nazi authorities carried out ghettoisations and mass killings of the Jewish populations in Lithuania and Latvia. Over 190,000 Lithuanian Jews, nearly 95% of Lithuania's pre-war Jewish community, and 66,000 Latvian Jews were murdered. The German occupation lasted until late 1944 (in Courland, until early 1945), when the countries were reoccupied by the Red Army and Soviet rule was re-established, with the passive agreement of the United States and Britain (see Yalta Conference and Potsdam Agreement).

The forced collectivization of agriculture began in 1947, and was completed after the mass deportation in March 1949 (see Operation Priboi). Private farms were confiscated, and farmers were forced to join the collective farms. In all three countries, partisans, known colloquially as the Forest Brothers, Latvian national partisans, and Lithuanian partisans, waged unsuccessful guerrilla warfare against the Soviet occupation for the next eight years in a bid to regain their nations' independence. The armed resistance of the anti-Soviet partisans lasted up to 1953. Although the armed resistance was defeated, the majority of the population remained anti-Soviet.

Lithuania, Latvia and Estonia were considered to be under Soviet occupation by the United States, the United Kingdom, Canada, the European Parliament, NATO, and many other countries and international organizations. During the Cold War, Lithuania and Latvia maintained legations in Washington DC, while Estonia had a mission in New York City. Each was staffed initially by diplomats from the last governments before USSR occupation.

=== Restoration of independence ===
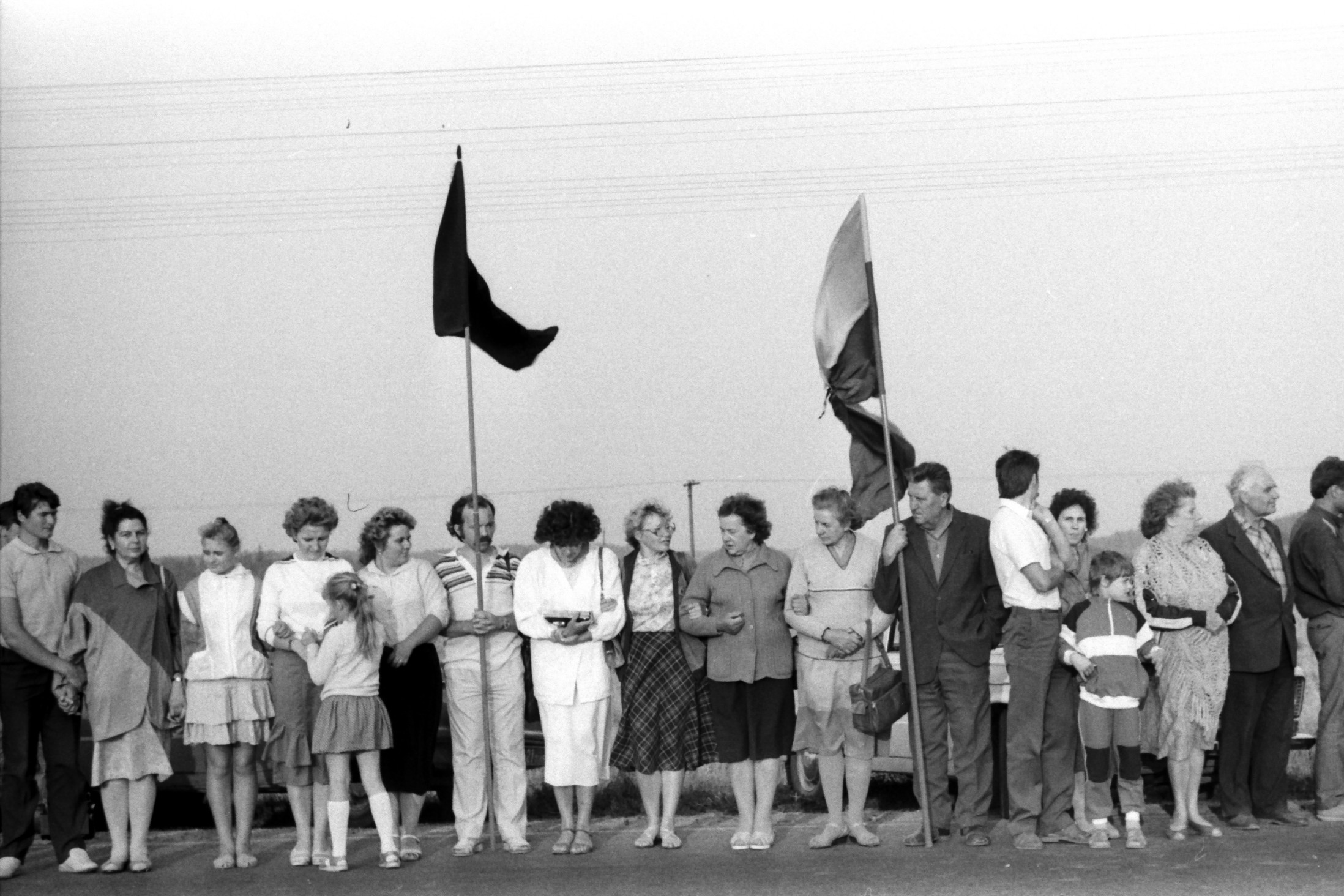
The Baltic Way was a mass anti-Soviet demonstration in 1989 where c. 25% of the total population of the Baltic countries participated.

In the late 1980s, a massive campaign of civil resistance against Soviet rule, known as the Singing revolution, began. On 23 August 1989, the Baltic Way, a two-million-strong human chain, stretched for 600 km from Tallinn to Vilnius. In the wake of this campaign, Mikhail Gorbachev's central government in Moscow had privately concluded that the departure of the Baltic republics had become "inevitable". This process contributed to the dissolution of the Soviet Union, setting a precedent for the other Soviet republics to secede from the USSR. The Soviet Union recognized the independence of three Baltic states on 6 September 1991. Troops were withdrawn from the region (starting from Lithuania) from August 1993. The last Russian troops were withdrawn from there in August 1994. Skrunda-1, the last Russian military radar in the Baltics, officially suspended operations in August 1998.

=== 21st century ===
All three Baltic countries are today liberal democracies, with unicameral parliaments elected by popular vote for four-year terms: Riigikogu in Estonia, Saeima in Latvia and Seimas in Lithuania. In Latvia and Estonia, the president is elected by parliament, while Lithuania has a semi-presidential system whereby the president is elected by popular vote. All are part of the European Union (EU) and members of the North Atlantic Treaty Organization (NATO), being the only post-Soviet states to be so.

Each of the three countries has declared itself to be the restoration of the sovereign nation that had existed from 1918 to 1940, emphasizing their contention that the Soviet occupation of the Baltic states during World War II and the following Cold War period had been an illegal occupation and annexation.

The same legal interpretation is shared by the United States, the United Kingdom, and most other Western democracies, who held the forcible incorporation of Estonia, Latvia, and Lithuania into the Soviet Union to be illegal. At least formally, most Western democracies never considered the three Baltic states to be constituent parts of the Soviet Union. Australia was a brief exception to this support of Baltic independence: in 1974, the Labor government of Australia did recognize Soviet dominion, but this decision was reversed by the next Australian Parliament. Other exceptions included Sweden, which was the first Western country, and one of the very few to ever do so, to recognize the incorporation of the Baltic states into the Soviet Union as lawful.

After the Baltic states had restored their independence in August 1991, integration with Western Europe became a major strategic goal. In 2002, the Baltic governments applied to join the European Union and become members of NATO. All three became NATO members on 29 March 2004, and joined the EU on 1 May 2004.

== Regional cooperation ==
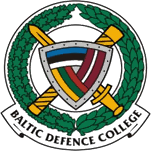
Baltic Defence College serves as a centre of strategic and operational research and provides professional military education to intermediate- and senior-level officers and government officials.

During the Baltic struggle for independence 1989–1992, a personal friendship developed between the (at that time unrecognized) Baltic ministers of foreign affairs and the Nordic ministers of foreign affairs. This friendship led to the creation of the Council of the Baltic Sea States in 1992, and the EuroFaculty in 1993.

Between 1994 and 2004, the BAFTA free trade agreement was established to help prepare the countries for their accession to the EU, rather than out of the Baltic states' desire to trade among themselves. The Baltic countries were more interested in gaining access to the rest of the European market.

Currently, the governments of the Baltic states cooperate in multiple ways, including cooperation among presidents, parliament speakers, heads of government, and foreign ministers. On 8 November 1991, the Baltic Assembly, which includes 15 to 20 MPs from each parliament, was established to facilitate inter-parliamentary cooperation. The Baltic Council of Ministers was established on 13 June 1994 to facilitate intergovernmental cooperation. Since 2003, there is coordination between the two organizations.

Compared with other regional groupings in Europe, such as the Nordic Council or Visegrád Group, Baltic cooperation is rather limited. All three countries are also members of the New Hanseatic League, an informal group of northern EU states formed to advocate a common fiscal position.

== Economies ==
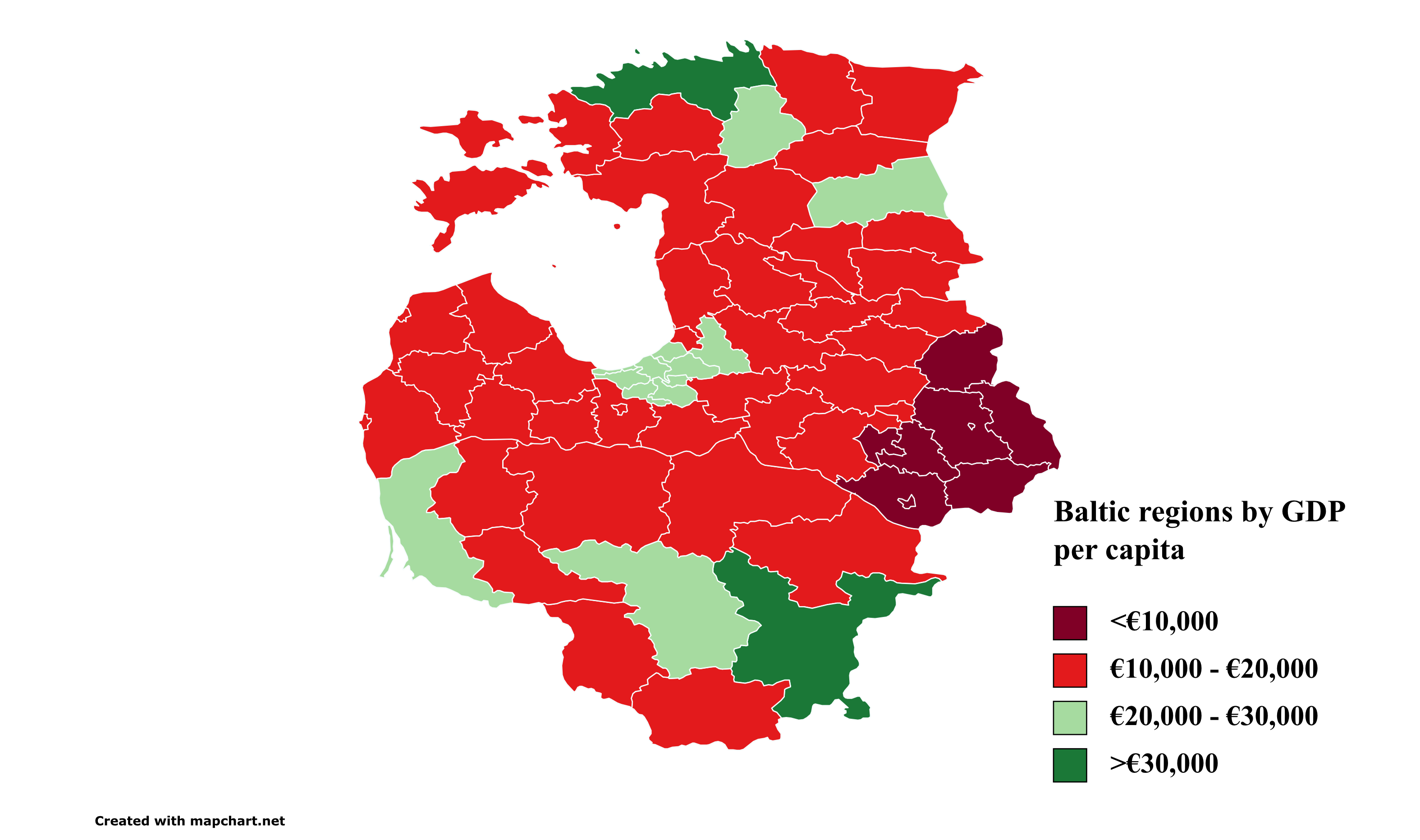
Baltic regions by GDP per capita, 2022

Economically, parallel with political changes and a transition to democracy – as a rule of law states – the nations' previous command economies were transformed via the legislation into market economies, and set up or renewed the major macroeconomic factors: budgetary rules, national audit, national currency and central bank. Generally, they shortly encountered the following problems: high inflation, high unemployment, low economic growth and high government debt. The inflation rate, in the examined area, relatively quickly dropped to below 5% by 2000. Meanwhile, these economies were stabilized, and in 2004 all of them joined the European Union. New macroeconomic requirements have arisen for them; the Maastricht criteria became obligatory and later the Stability and Growth Pact set stricter rules through national legislation by implementing the regulations and directives of the Sixpack, because the financial crisis was a shocking milestone. Economic activity in the Baltic states is highly concentrated in the metropolitan areas of the capital cities, which account for a disproportionately large share of national GDP compared to other regions.

All three countries are member states of the European Union, and the Eurozone. They are classified as high-income economies by the World Bank and maintain high Human Development Index. Estonia, Latvia, and Lithuania are also members of the OECD. Estonia adopted the euro currency in January 2011, Latvia in January 2014, and Lithuania in January 2015.

Downtown Vilnius

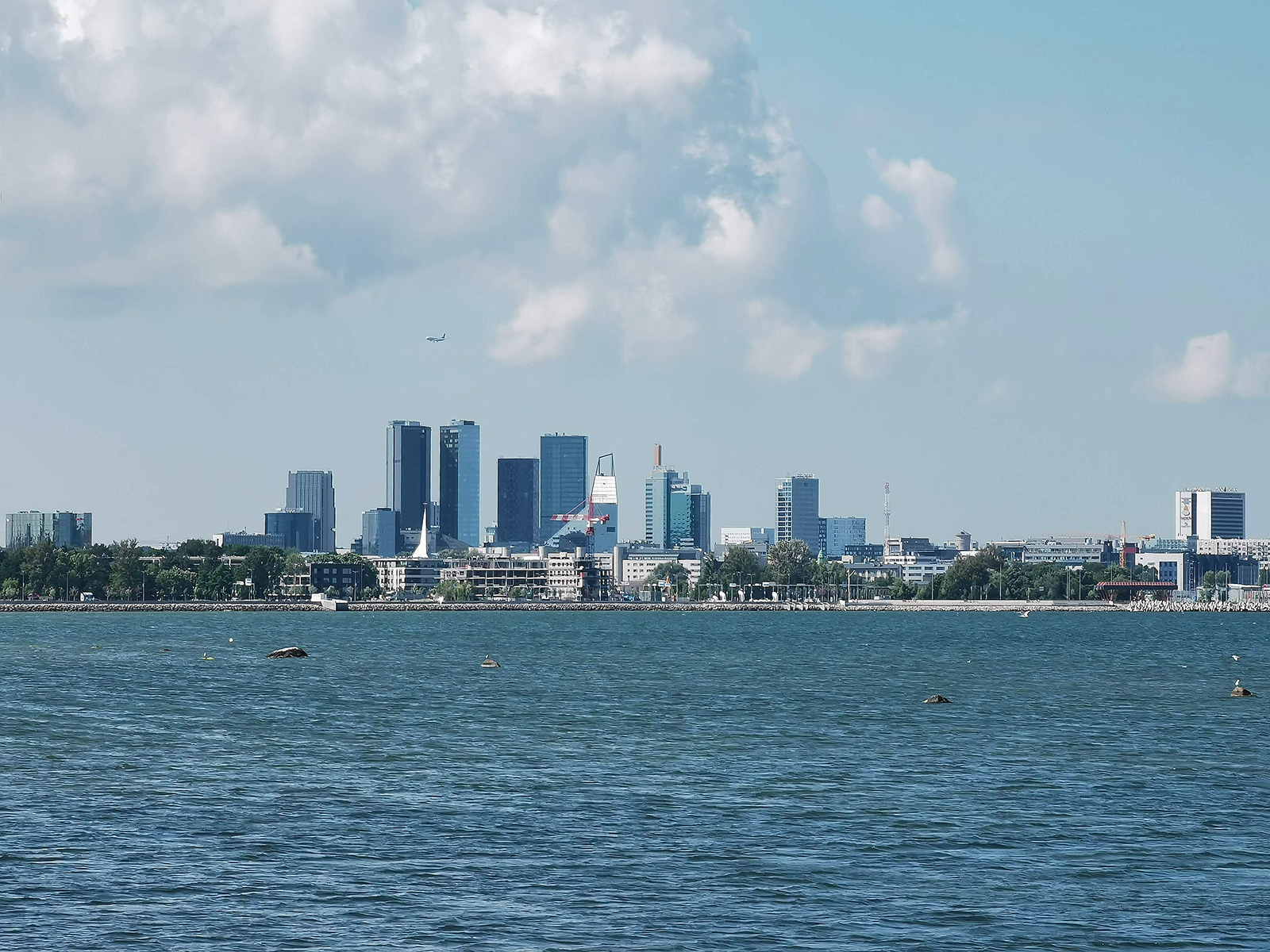
Downtown Tallinn

=== Energy security ===
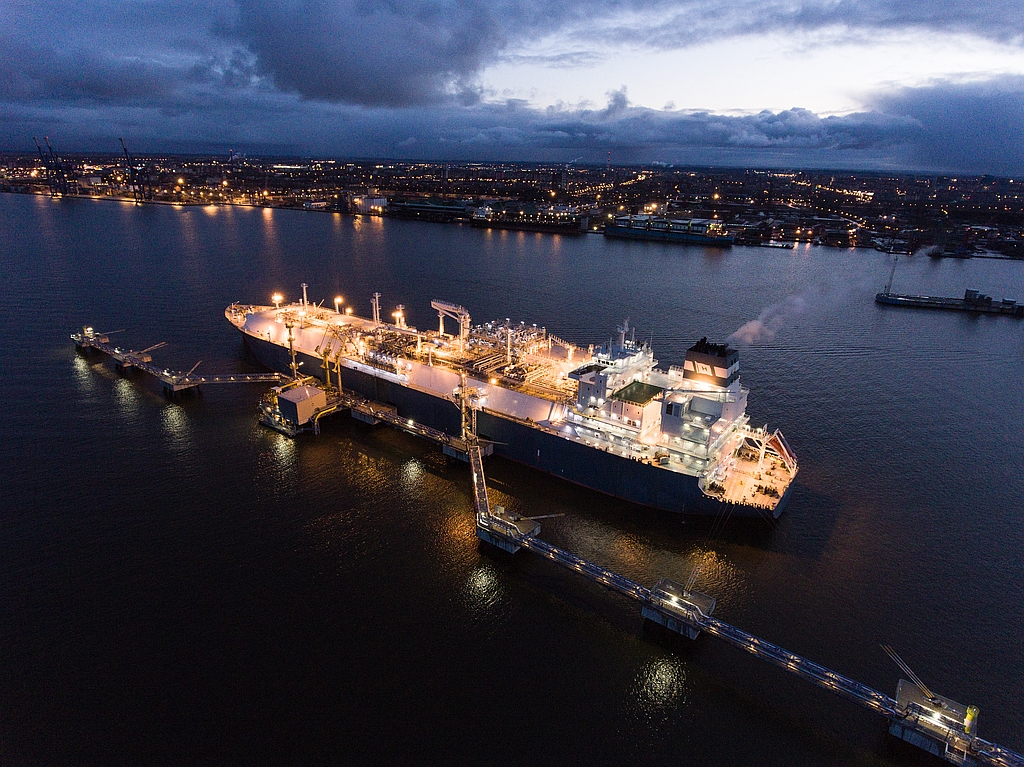
Klaipėda LNG terminal can supply gas for all three Baltic countries.

As a part of the EU from 2004, Baltic states must comply with the EU's regulations in energy, environmental and security spheres. One of the most important documents that the EU applied to improve the energy security stance of the Baltic states are European Union climate and energy package, including the Climate and Energy Strategy 2020, that aims to reduce the greenhouse emissions to 20%, increase the energy production from renewables for 20% in overall share and 20% energy efficiency development.

In light of the Russian invasion of Ukraine in 2022 and Russia's weaponization of energy supplies, the Baltic states were among the best-equipped countries in Central and Eastern Europe to deal with the energy crisis. This was because ever since the early 1990s, the Baltic states were investing in alternative and non-Russian energy supply routes. These included the development of the Būtingė oil terminal, electricity interconnections with Sweden (NordBalt), Finland (Estlink) and Poland (LitPol Link), the Klaipėda LNG terminal, Gas Interconnection Poland–Lithuania and the Inčukalns underground gas storage facility. All of these and other infrastructure projects allowed the Baltic States to quickly shift away from Russian energy supplies.

In February 2025, the three Baltic states disconnected from the IPS/UPS electricity grid and successfully completed the synchronization with CESA. They now operate in "island mode", relying entirely on domestic electricity generation to balance their grids. The transition proceeded without outages, but recent incidents involving underwater cable disruptions have underscored regional energy infrastructure vulnerabilities.

== Culture ==
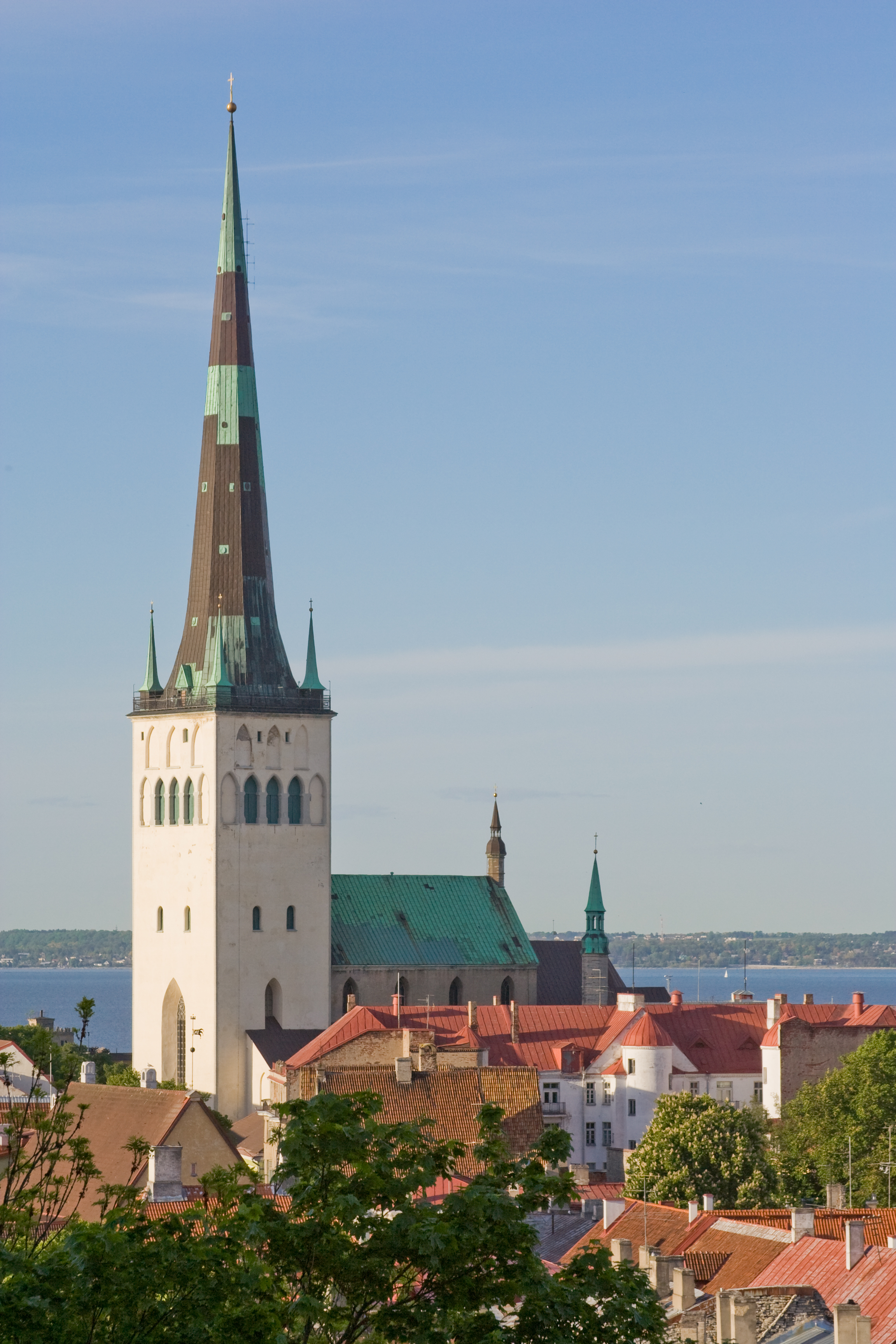
St. Olaf's Church in Tallinn, Estonia

=== Ethnic groups ===
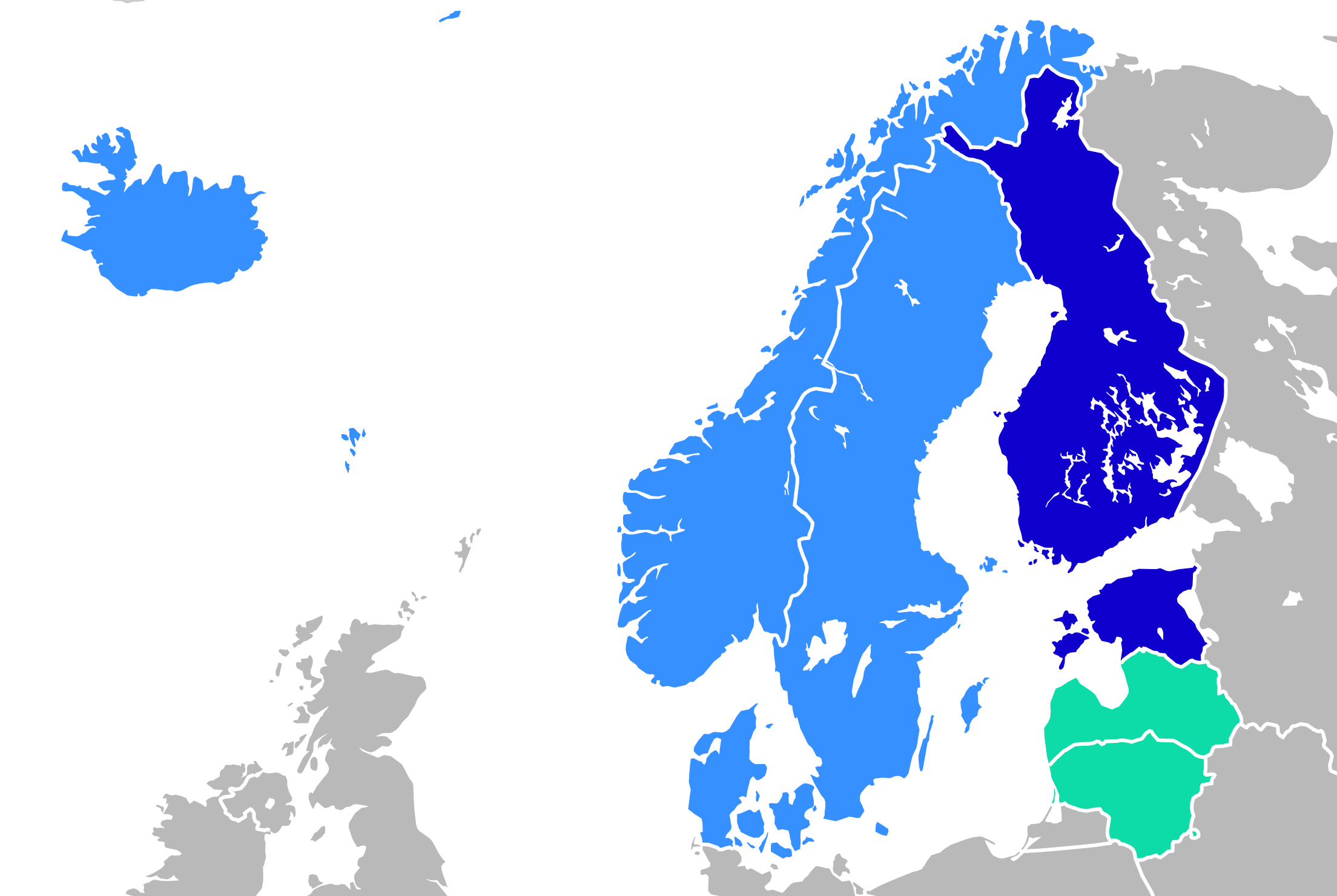
Language branches in Northern Europe: North Germanic (Faroe Islands, Iceland and Scandinavia) Finnic (Finland, Estonia) Baltic (Latvia, Lithuania)

Estonians are Finnic people, together with the nearby Finns. The Latvians and Lithuanians, linguistically and culturally related to each other, are Baltic Indo-European people. In Latvia exists a small community of Finnic people related to the Estonians, composed of only 250 people, known as Livonians, and they live in the so-called Livonian Coast. The peoples in the Baltic states have together inhabited the eastern coast of the Baltic Sea for millennia, although not always peacefully in ancient times, over which period their populations, Estonian, Latvian, and Lithuanian, have remained remarkably stable within the approximate territorial boundaries of the current Baltic states. While separate peoples with their own customs and traditions, historical factors have introduced cultural similarities in and differences within them.

The populations of each Baltic country belong to several Christian denominations, a reflection of historical circumstances. Both Western and Eastern Christianity had been introduced by the end of the first millennium. The current divide between Lutheranism to the north and Catholicism to the south is the remnant of Swedish and Polish hegemony, respectively, with Orthodox Christianity remaining the dominant religion among Russian and other East Slavic minorities.

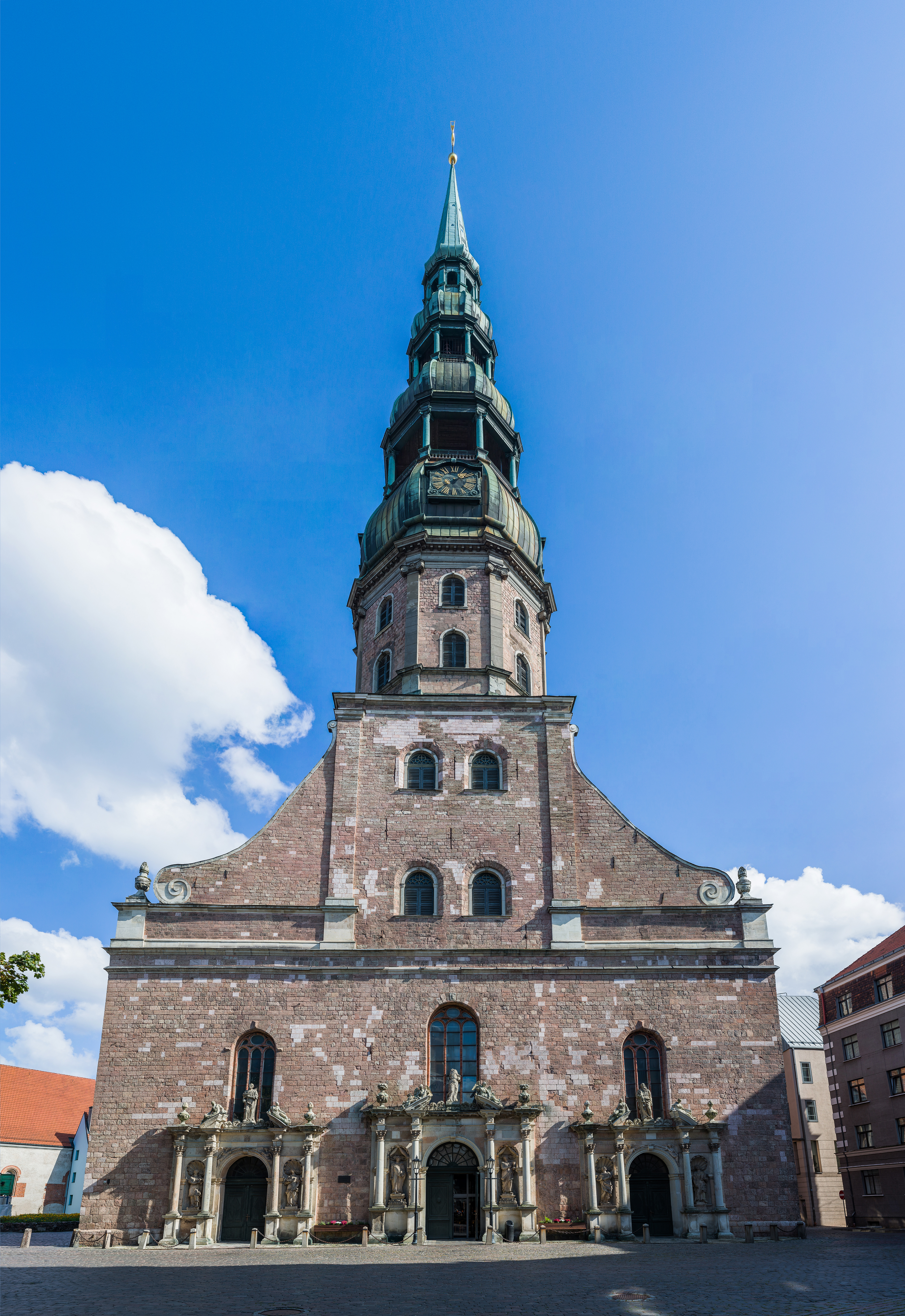
St. Peter's Lutheran Church, Riga, Latvia

The Baltic states have historically been in many different spheres of influence, from Danish over Swedish and Polish–Lithuanian, to German (Hansa and Holy Roman Empire), and before independence in the Russian sphere of influence.

The Baltic states are inhabited by several ethnic minorities: in Latvia: 33.0% (including 25.4% Russian, 3.3% Belarusian, 2.2% Ukrainian, and 2.1% Polish), in Estonia: 27.6% (including 22.0% Russian and 10.2% others) and in Lithuania: 12.2% (including 5.6% Polish and 4.5% Russian).

The Soviet Union conducted a policy of Russification by encouraging Russians and other Russian-speaking ethnic groups of the Soviet Union to settle in the Baltics. Today, ethnic Russian immigrants from the former Soviet Union and their descendants make up a sizable group particularly in Latvia (about one-quarter of the total population and close to one-half in the capital Riga) and Estonia (nearly one-quarter of the total population).

Because the three countries had been independent nations prior to their occupation by the Soviet Union, there was a strong feeling of national identity (often labeled "bourgeois nationalism" by the Communist Party) and popular resentment towards the imposed Soviet rule in the three countries, in combination with Soviet cultural policy, which employed superficial multiculturalism (in order for the Soviet Union to appear as a multinational union based on the free will of its peoples) in limits allowed by the communist "internationalist" (but in effect pro-Russification) ideology and under tight control of the Communist Party (those of the Baltic nationals who crossed the line were called "bourgeois nationalists" and repressed). This let Estonians, Latvians and Lithuanians preserve a high degree of Europe-oriented national identity. In Soviet times this made them appear as the "West" of the Soviet Union in the cultural and political sense, thus as close to emigration a Russian could get without leaving the USSR.

=== Languages ===
The languages of the three Baltic peoples belong to two distinct language families. The Latvian and Lithuanian languages belong to the Indo-European language family and are the only extant (widely recognized) members of the Baltic language group (or more specifically, Eastern Baltic subgroup of Baltic). Latgalian and Samogitian are considered either separate languages or dialects of Latvian and Lithuanian, respectively.

The Estonian language (including its divergent Võro and Seto dialects) is a Finnic language, together with neighbouring Finland's Finnish language. It is also related to the now near-extinct Livonian language spoken as a second language by a few dozen people in Latvia.

Catholic Church of St. Johns, Vilnius, Lithuania

Apart from the indigenous languages, Low Saxon was the dominant language in Estonia and Latvia in academics, professional life, and upper society from the 13th century until World War I. Polish served a similar function in Lithuania. Numerous Swedish loanwords have made it into the Estonian language; it was under the Swedish rule that schools were established and education propagated in the 17th century. Swedish remains spoken in Estonia, particularly the Estonian Swedish dialect of the Estonian Swedes of northern Estonia and the islands (though many fled to Sweden as the USSR invaded and re-occupied Estonia in 1944). There is also significant proficiency in Finnish in Estonia owing to its linguistic relationship with Estonian and also widespread exposure to Finnish broadcasts during the Soviet era.

Russian was the most commonly studied foreign language at all levels of schooling during the period of Soviet rule in 1944–1991. Despite schooling available and administration conducted in local languages, Russian-speaking settlers were neither encouraged nor motivated to learn the official local languages, so knowledge of some Russian became a practical necessity in daily life in Russian-dominated urban areas. As a result, even to this day most of the three countries' middle age and senior population can understand and speak some Russian, especially people aged over 50 years who went to school during the Soviet rule. The question of assimilation, or integration, of the Russian-speaking immigrants is a major factor in current social and diplomatic affairs.

Since the decline of Russian influence and integration into the European Union economy, English has become the most popular second language in the Baltic states. Although Russian is more widely spoken among older people the vast majority of young people are learning English instead with as many as 80 percent of young Lithuanians professing English proficiency, and similar trends in the other Baltic states.

Baltic Romani is spoken by the Roma.

== Geography ==
The Baltic States cover an area of 175,228 square kilometres (67,656 sq mi) (roughly twice the size of mainland Portugal), with a population of 6,132,500 (2024). Bordered by the Baltic Sea to the west and the north, they share borders with Russia, Belarus, and Poland. The Kaliningrad Oblast, formerly known as Königsberg in Germany, is landlocked between Lithuania and Poland and belongs to Russia.

The terrain of this region is relatively flat, punctuated by numerous lakes and ponds, particularly in the north, and hills in Lithuania.

=== Nature ===
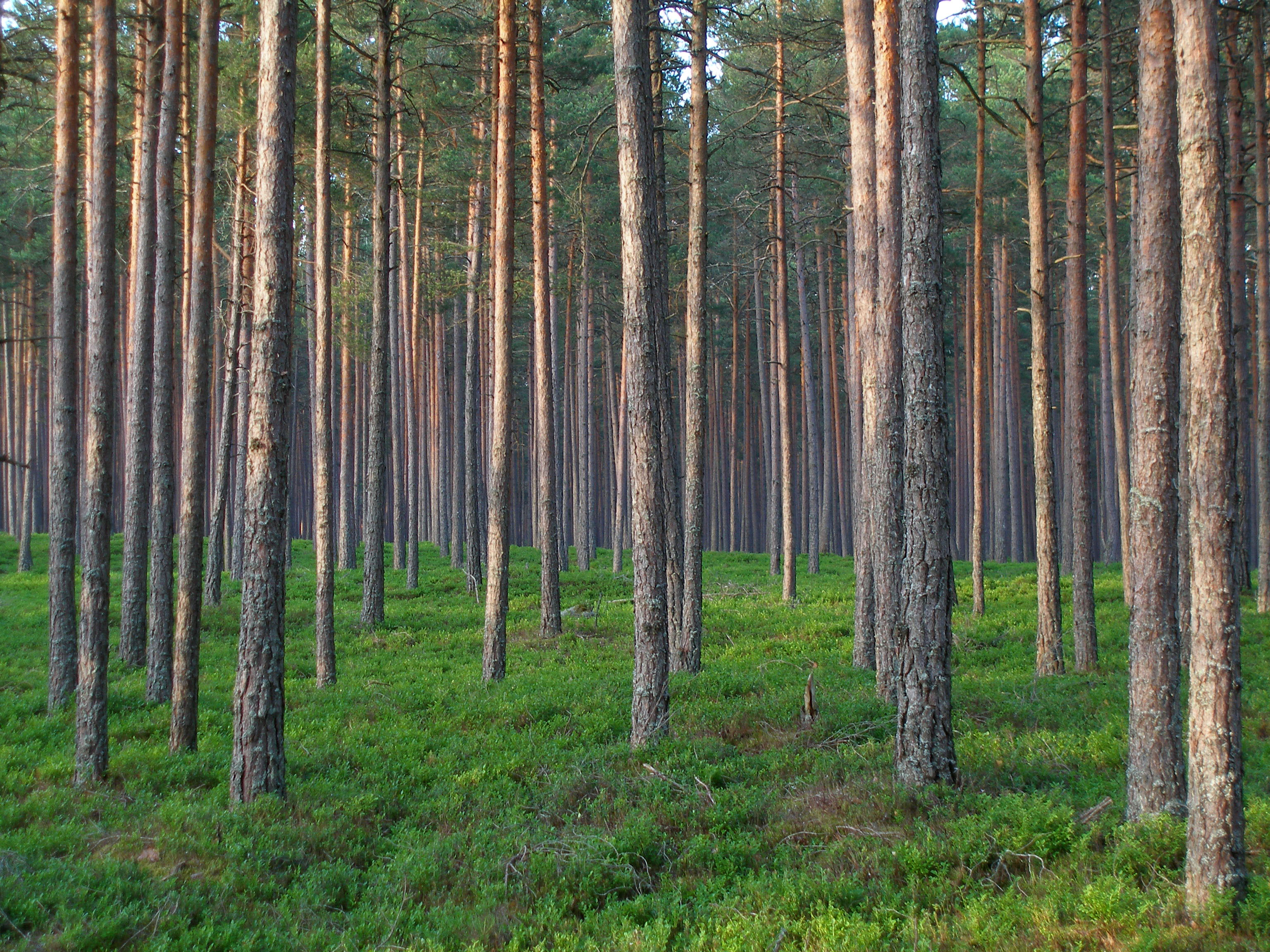
Forests cover nearly half the landmass of Estonia.

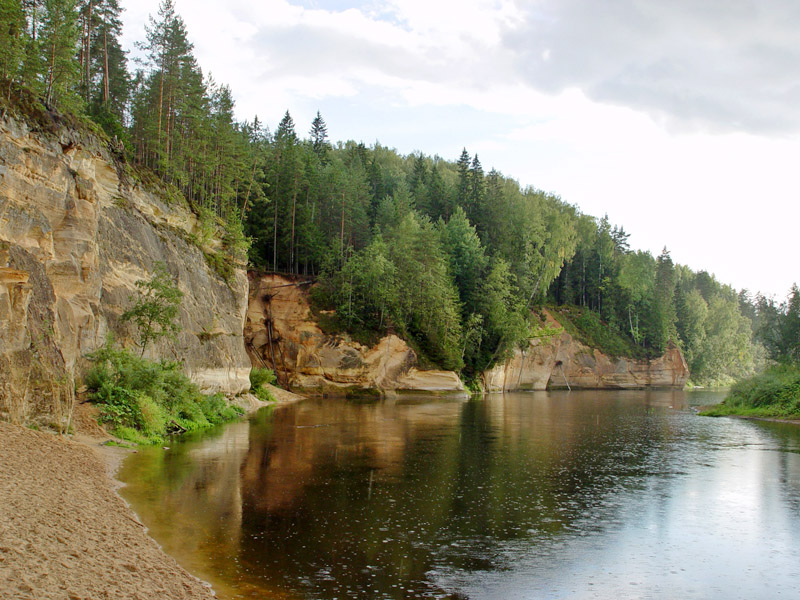
Devonian sandstone cliffs in Gauja National Park, Latvia's largest and oldest national park

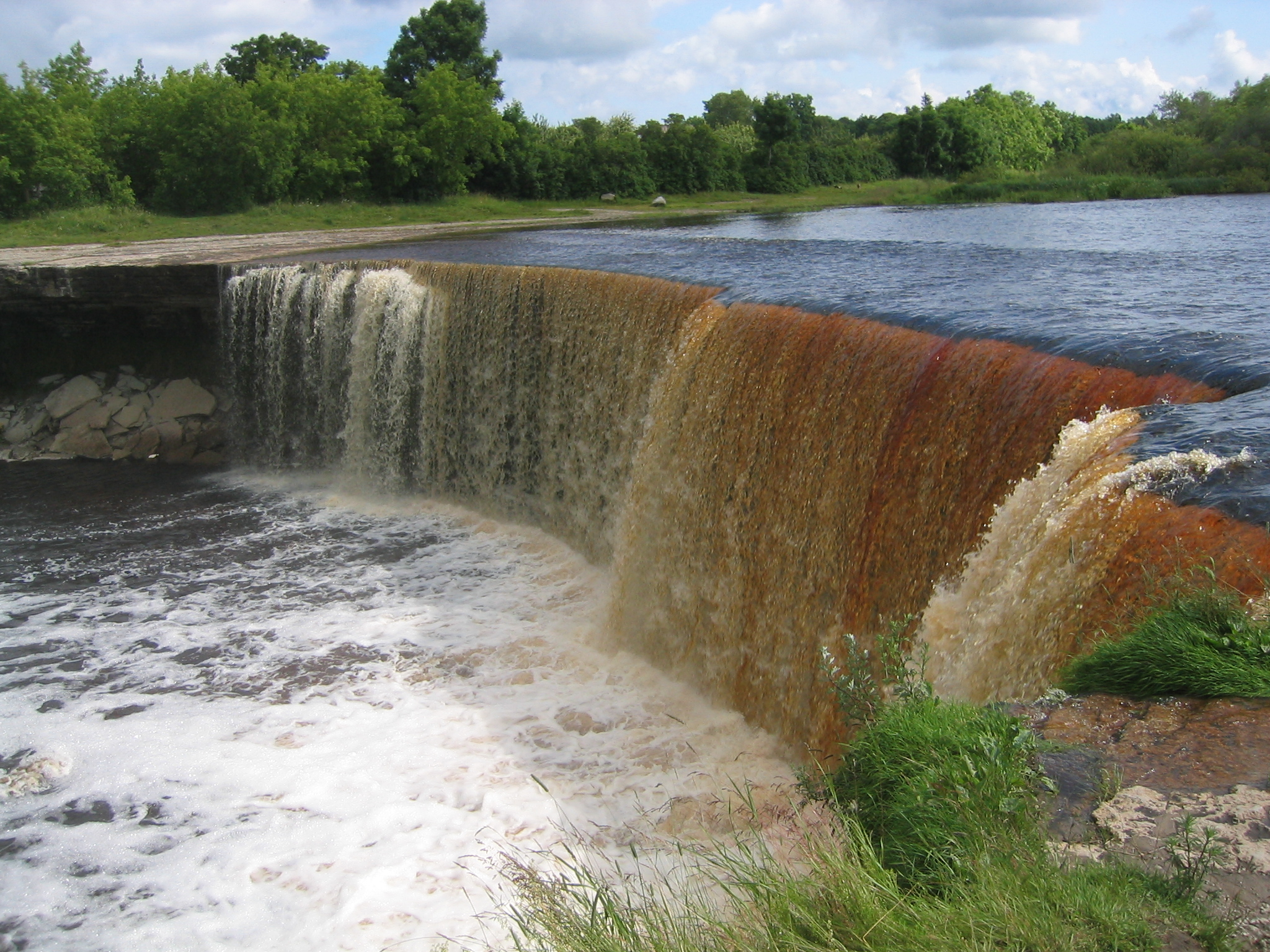
Jägala Falls is the highest natural waterfall in Estonia.

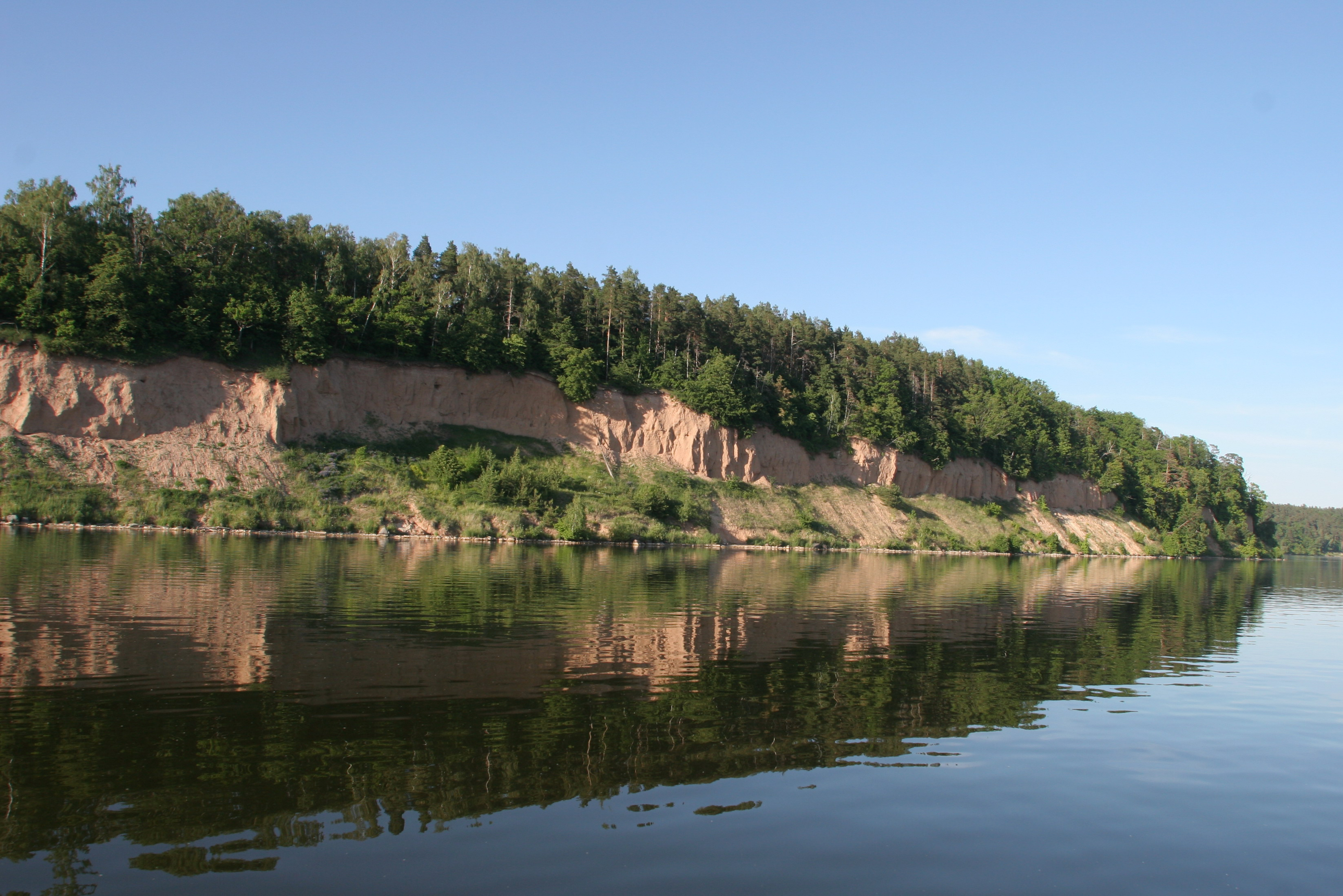
Gastilionys cliffs in Kauno Marios Regional Park, near Kaunas

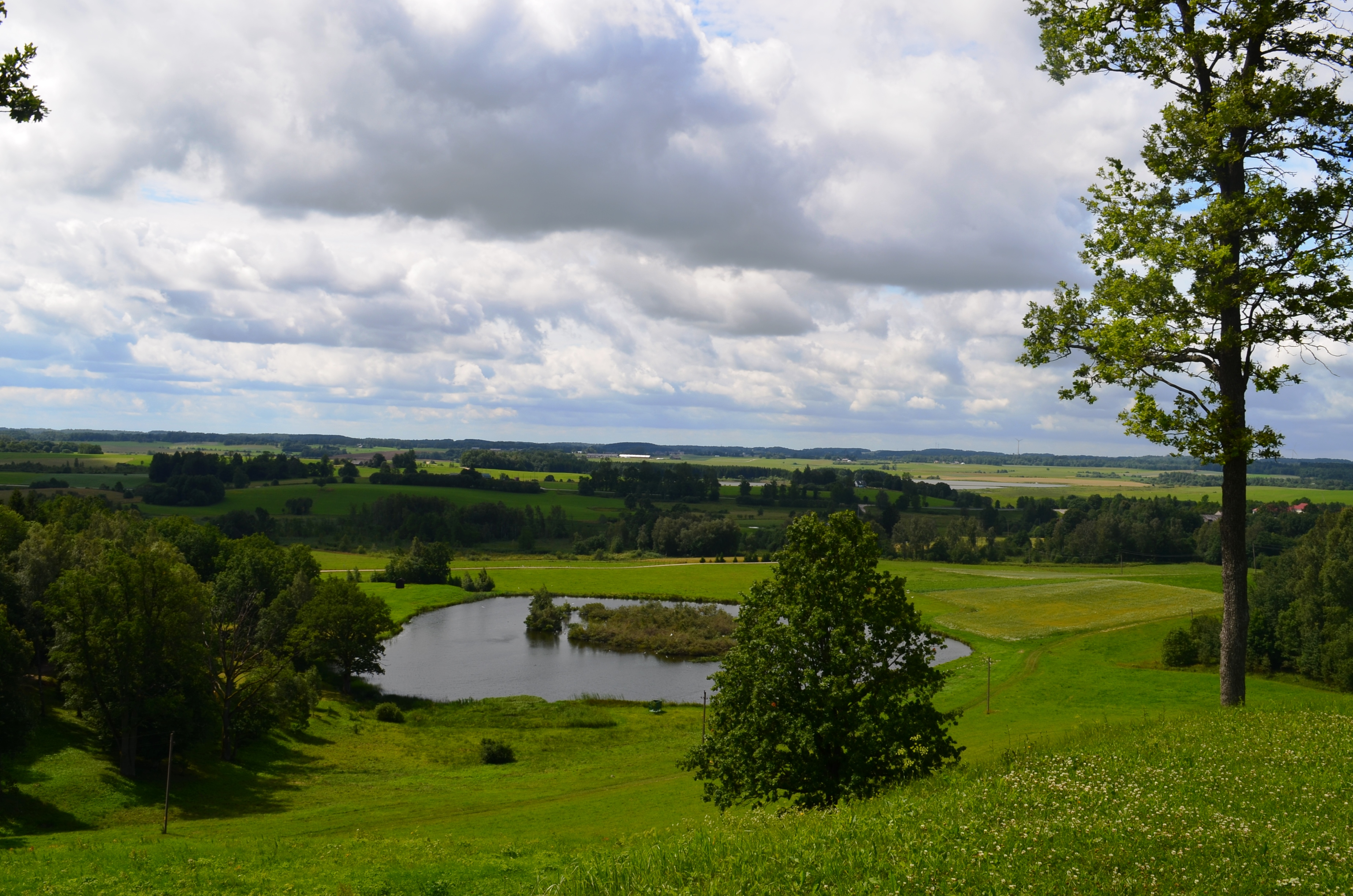
View from the Bilioniai forthill in Lithuania

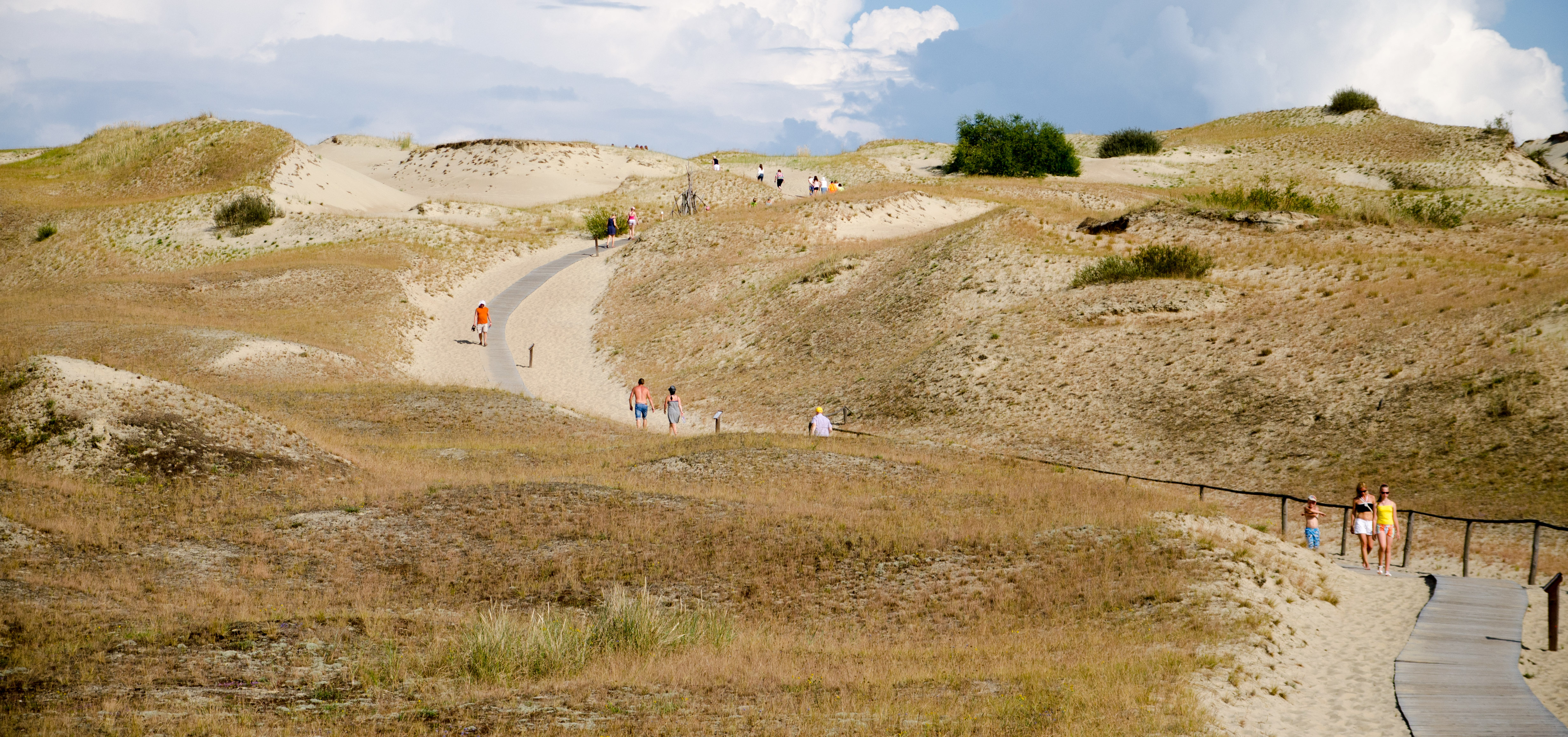
Sand dunes of the Curonian Spit, near Nida, which are the highest drifting sand dunes in Europe (UNESCO World Heritage Site)

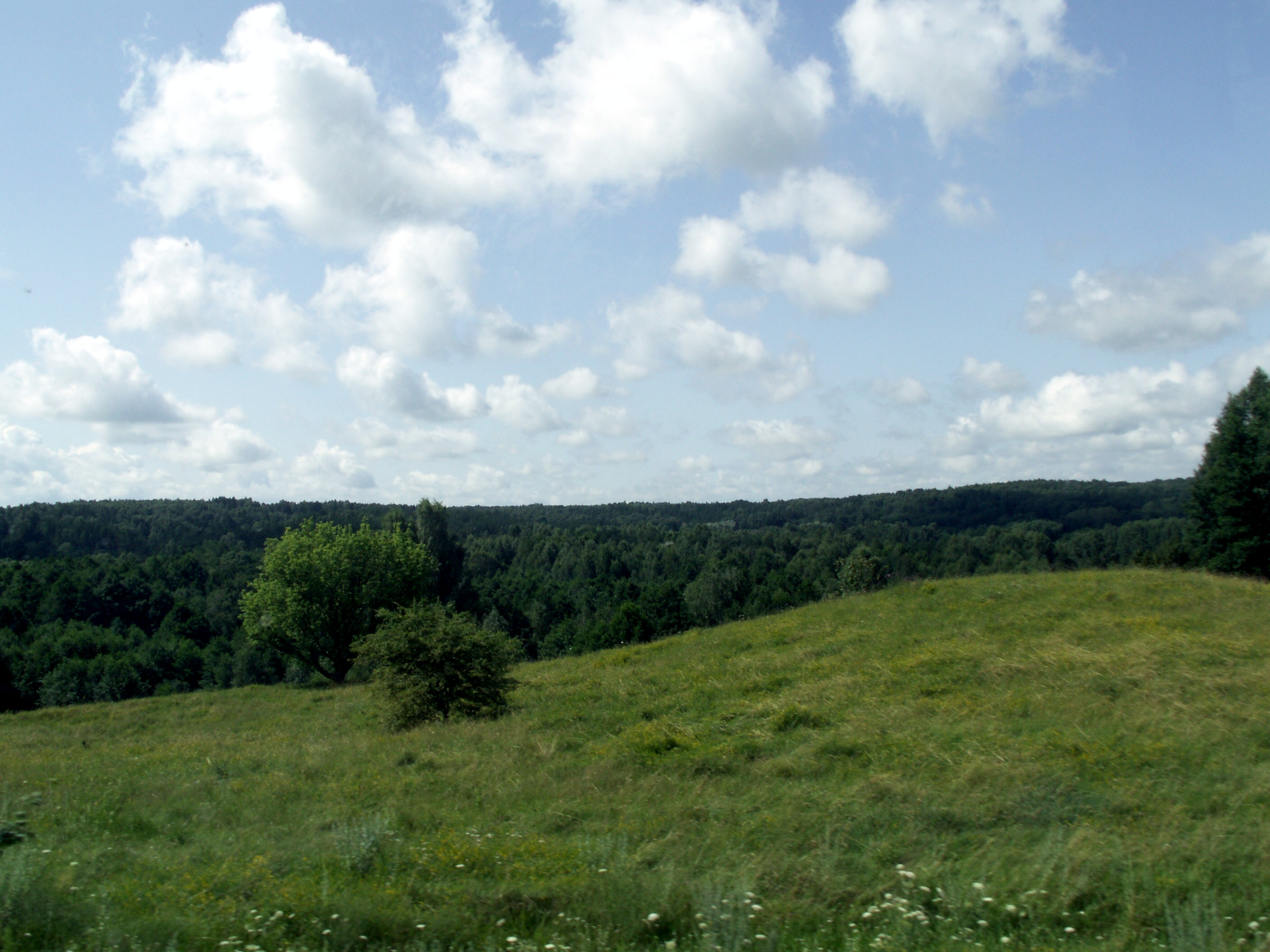
Romincka Forest in the region of Prussia

== Current leaders ==
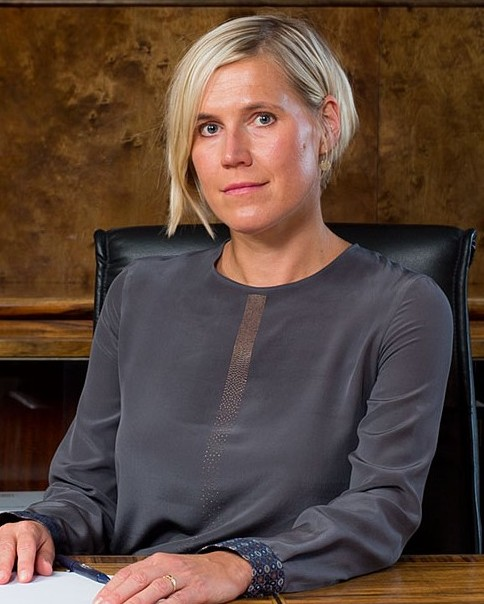
President of Estonia
Ülle Madise

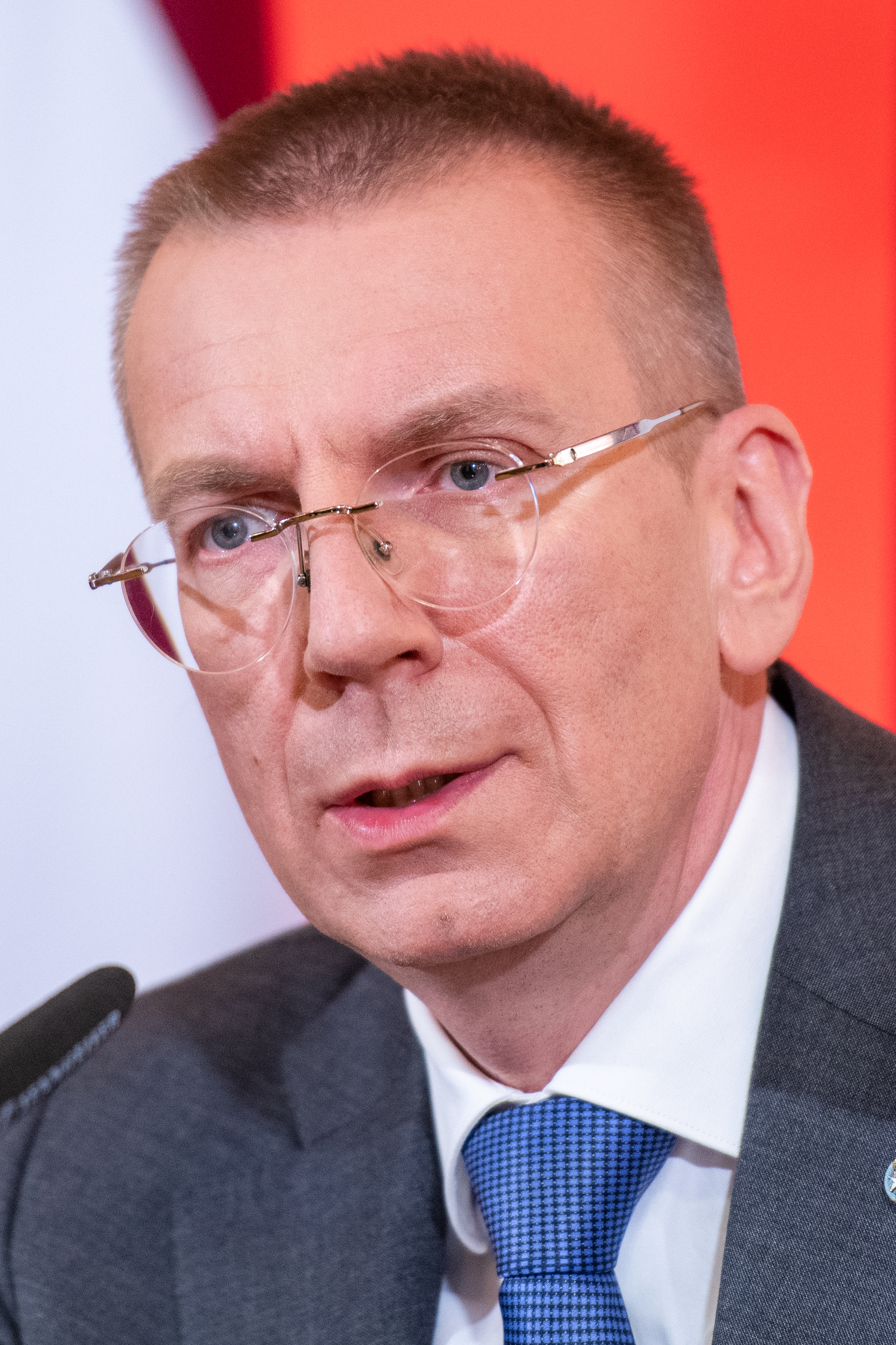
President of Latvia
Edgars Rinkēvičs

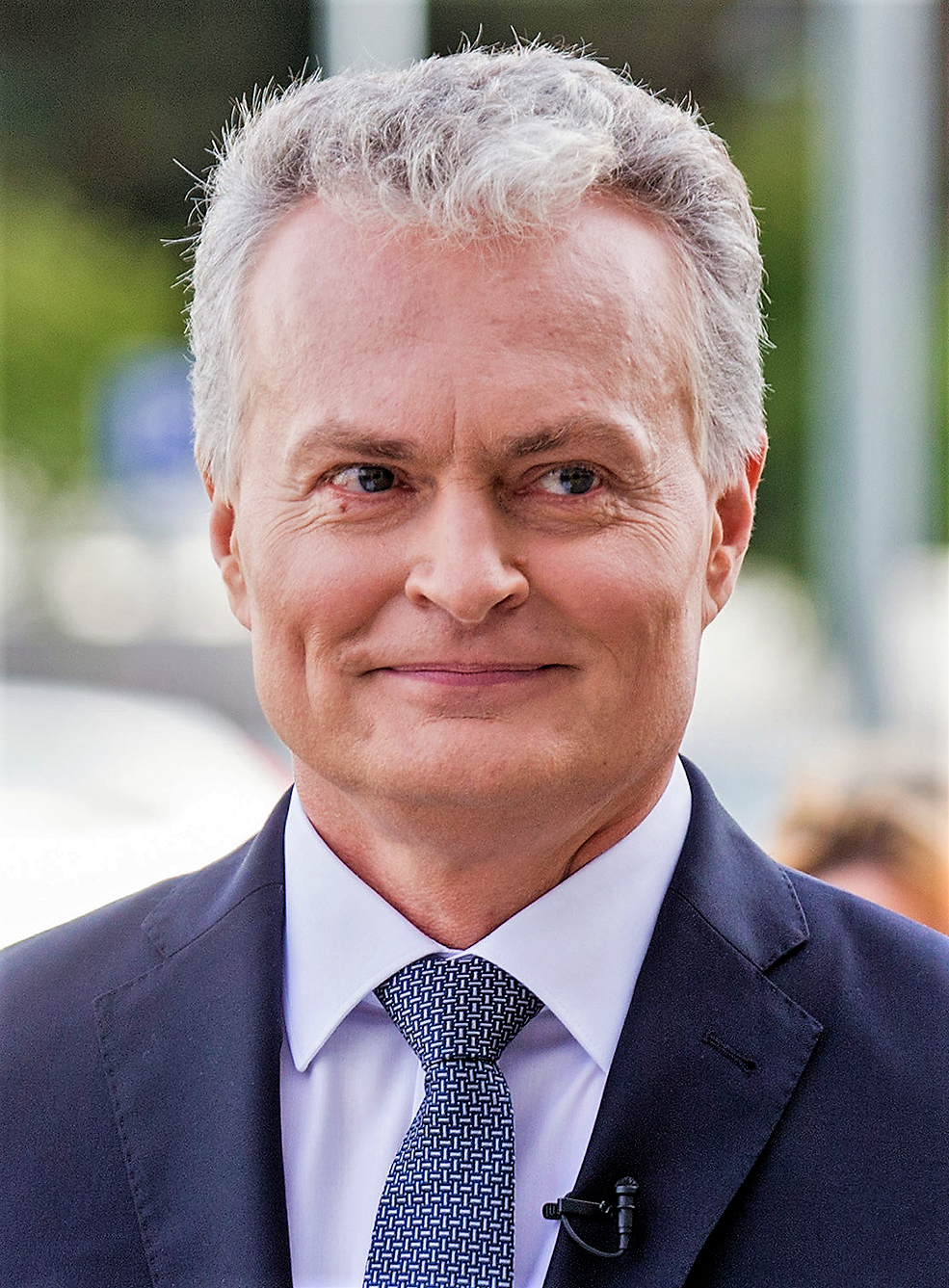
President of Lithuania
Gitanas Nausėda
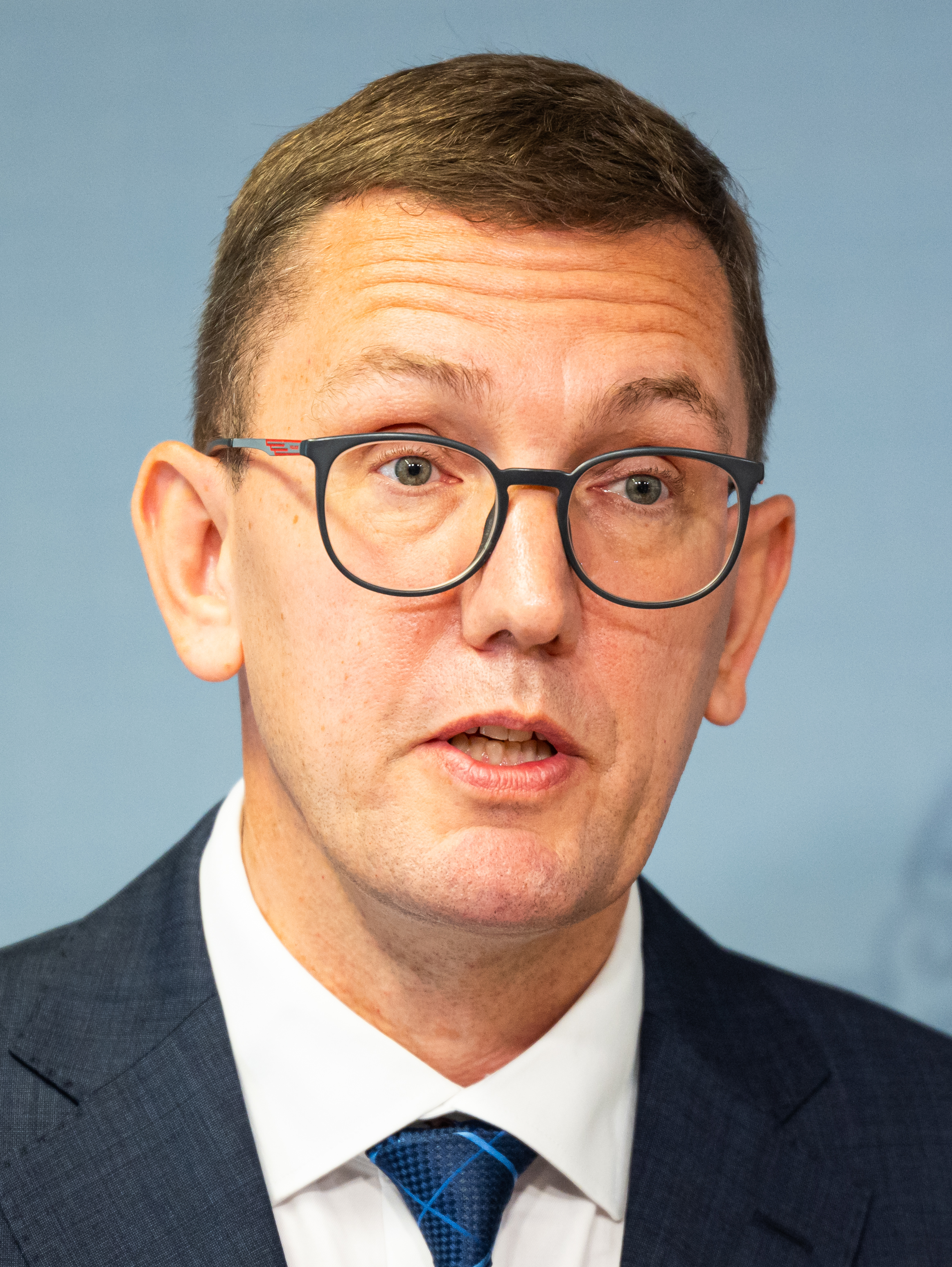
Prime Minister of Estonia
Kristen Michal

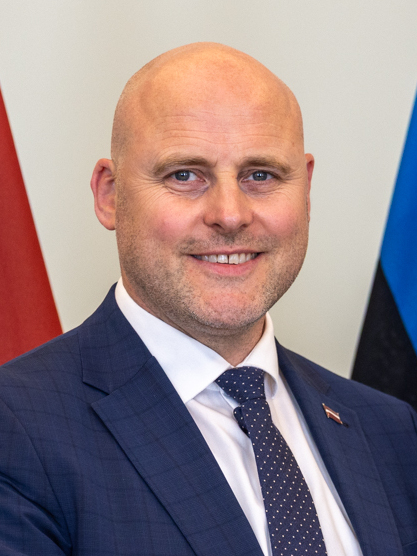
Prime Minister of Latvia
Andris Kulbergs

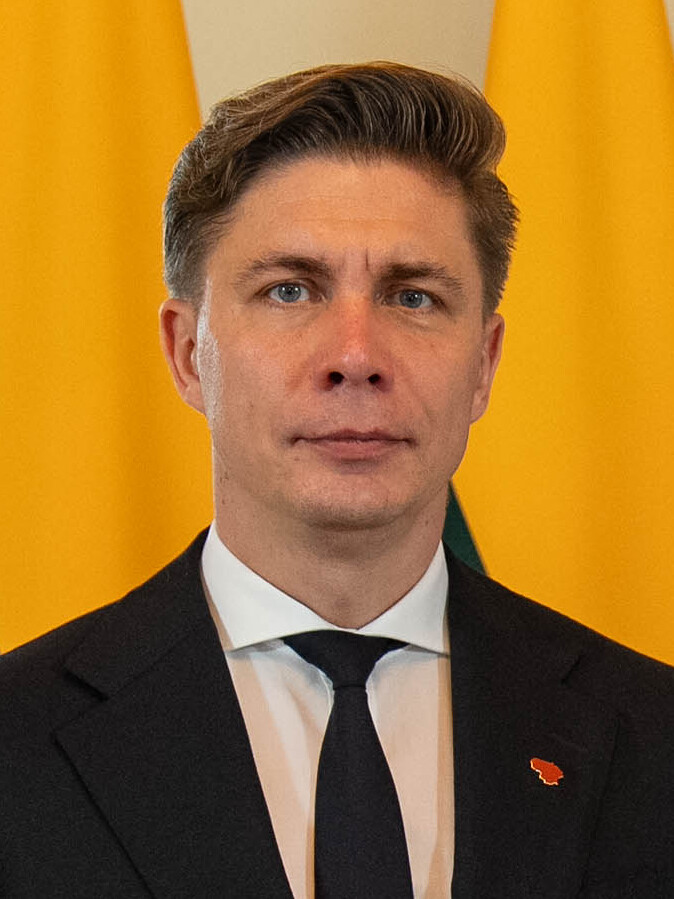
Prime Minister of Lithuania
Mindaugas Sinkevičius

== General statistics ==
All three are unitary republics, which simultaneously joined the European Union on 1 May 2004, share EET/EEST time zone schedules and the euro currency.

	Estonia	Latvia	Lithuania	Total
Coat of arms	Estonia	Latvia	Lithuania	—N/a
Flag	Estonia	Latvia	Lithuania	—N/a
Capital	Tallinn	Riga	Vilnius	—N/a
Statehood	24 February 1918; Restored 20 August 1991	18 November 1918; Restored 21 August 1991	Grand Duchy of Lithuania until 1795; 16 February 1918; Restored 11 March 1990	—N/a
Political system	Parliamentary republic	Parliamentary republic	Semi-presidential republic	—N/a
Parliament	Riigikogu	Saeima	Seimas	—N/a
Current President	Alar Karis	Edgars Rinkēvičs	Gitanas Nausėda	—N/a
Current Prime Minister	Kristen Michal	Andris Kulbergs	Mindaugas Sinkevičius	—N/a
Largest urban area	Tallinn (646,315) ▲	Riga (923,624) ▼	Vilnius (767,907) ▲	—N/a
Population (2025)	1,362,954	1,823,500	2,886,000	6,072,454
Area	45,339 km^{2} = 17,505 sq mi	64,589 km^{2} = 24,938 sq mi	65,300 km^{2} = 25,212 sq mi	175,228 km^{2} = 67,656 sq mi
Density	30/km^{2} = 80/sq mi	29/km^{2} = 76/sq mi	44/km^{2} = 110/sq mi	35/km^{2} = 88/sq mi
Water area %	4.56%	1.5%	1.35%	2.47%
GDP (nominal) total (2024)	€41.62 billion (US$46.98 billion)	€43.03 billion (US$48.56 billion)	€84.06 billion (US$94.88 billion)	€168.08 billion (US$189.7 billion)
GDP (nominal) per capita (2024)	€30,380 (US$34,288.94)	€23,410 (US$26,422.12)	€29,100 (US$32,844.24)	—N/a
Military budget (2026)	€2.4 billion (US$2.71 billion)	€2.16 billion (US$2.44 billion)	€4.79 billion (US$5.41 billion)	€9.35 billion (US$10.55 billion)
Gini Index (2020)	30.5	34.5	35.1	—N/a
HDI (2023)	0.905 (Very High)	0.889 (Very High)	0.895 (Very High)	Very High
Internet TLD	.ee	.lv	.lt	—N/a
Calling code	+372	+371	+370	—N/a

== See also ==
- Baltia
- Baltic Entente
- Baltic Free Trade Area
- Baltic Germans
- Baltic governorates
- Baltic region
- Baltic Tiger
- Baltic Way
- Baltoscandia
- List of cities in the Baltic states by population
- Nordic-Baltic Eight
- Nordic countries
- Occupation of the Baltic states
- Russians in Estonia
- Russians in Latvia
- Russians in Lithuania
- Tourism in Estonia
- Tourism in Latvia
- Tourism in Lithuania
- Baltics deportations:
  - Soviet deportation from the Baltics in 1941
  - Soviet deportation from the Baltics in 1949
  - Soviet deportations from Estonia
  - Soviet deportations from Latvia
  - Soviet deportations from Lithuania
- Ethnic cleansing in the Baltics
  - German occupation of Estonia during World War II
  - German occupation of Latvia during World War II
  - German occupation of Lithuania during World War II
