= Border states (Eastern Europe) =

Political term

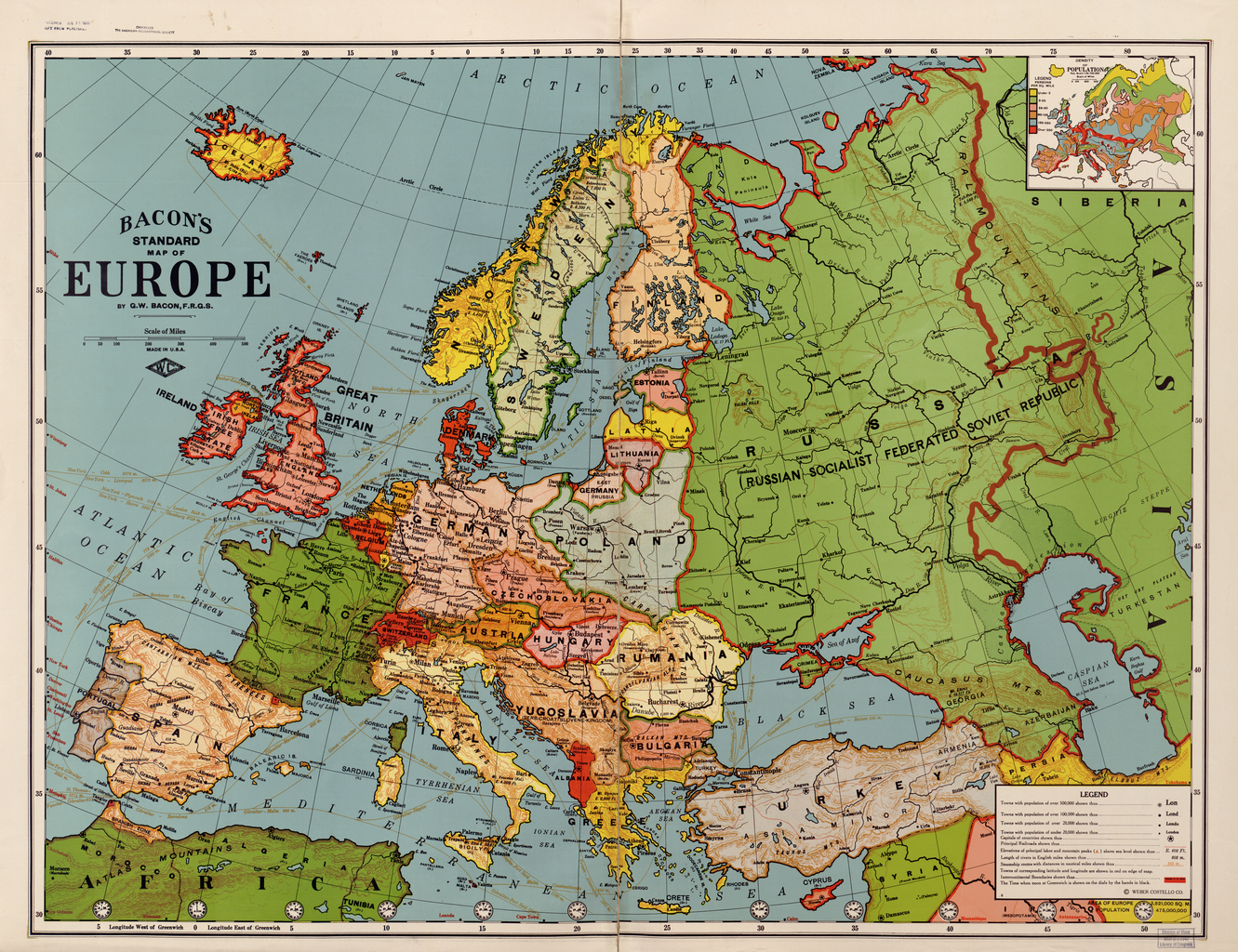
British map of Europe in the immediate aftermath of World War I and the overthrow of tsarist empire in Russia (green). Among the changes were the establishment of independent states of Estonia, Latvia, Lithuania, Poland, Czechoslovakia, and Yugoslavia (right of centre)

Border states, or European buffer states, were the European nations that won their independence from the Russian Empire after the Bolshevik Revolution of 1917, the Treaty of Brest-Litovsk and ultimately the defeat of the German Empire and Austria-Hungary in World War I. During the interwar period, the nations of Western Europe implemented a border states policy, which aimed at uniting them in protection against Soviet Russia and communist expansionism. The border states were interchangeably Finland, Estonia, Latvia, Lithuania, Poland, Romania and, until their annexation with Russia into the Soviet Union, short-lived Belarus and Ukraine.

The policy tended to see the border states as a cordon sanitaire, or buffer states, separating Western Europe from the newly formed Soviet Russia. The policy was very successful. At the time, Soviet foreign policy was driven by the Trotskyist idea of permanent revolution, the end goal of which was to spread communism worldwide through perpetual warfare. However, the Soviet advance to the west was halted by Poland, which managed to defeat the Red Army during the Polish–Soviet War. After the war, Polish leader Józef Piłsudski made attempts to unify the border states under a federation called Intermarium, but disputes and different allegiances between and within the group of states prevented such a thing from happening, leaving them more susceptible to possible incursions by their more powerful neighbors. The matter was further complicated by the rise of the expansionist Nazi Germany to the west. In 1939, Germany and the Soviet Union signed the Molotov–Ribbentrop Pact, which included a secret clause that sanctioned the partitioning of several border states between the two regimes in the event of war. Only nine days after the pact was signed, Nazi Germany invaded Poland, and the Soviets followed suit shortly after, beginning World War II in Europe. After the end of the war, all border states except for Finland were transferred to Soviet occupation as a result of the Western betrayal although Finland had already ceded some of its territory to the Soviet Union following the Winter War.

== See also ==
- Intermarium
- Limitrophe states
- Mitteleuropa
- March (territory)
- Post-Soviet states
