= Tourism in Estonia =

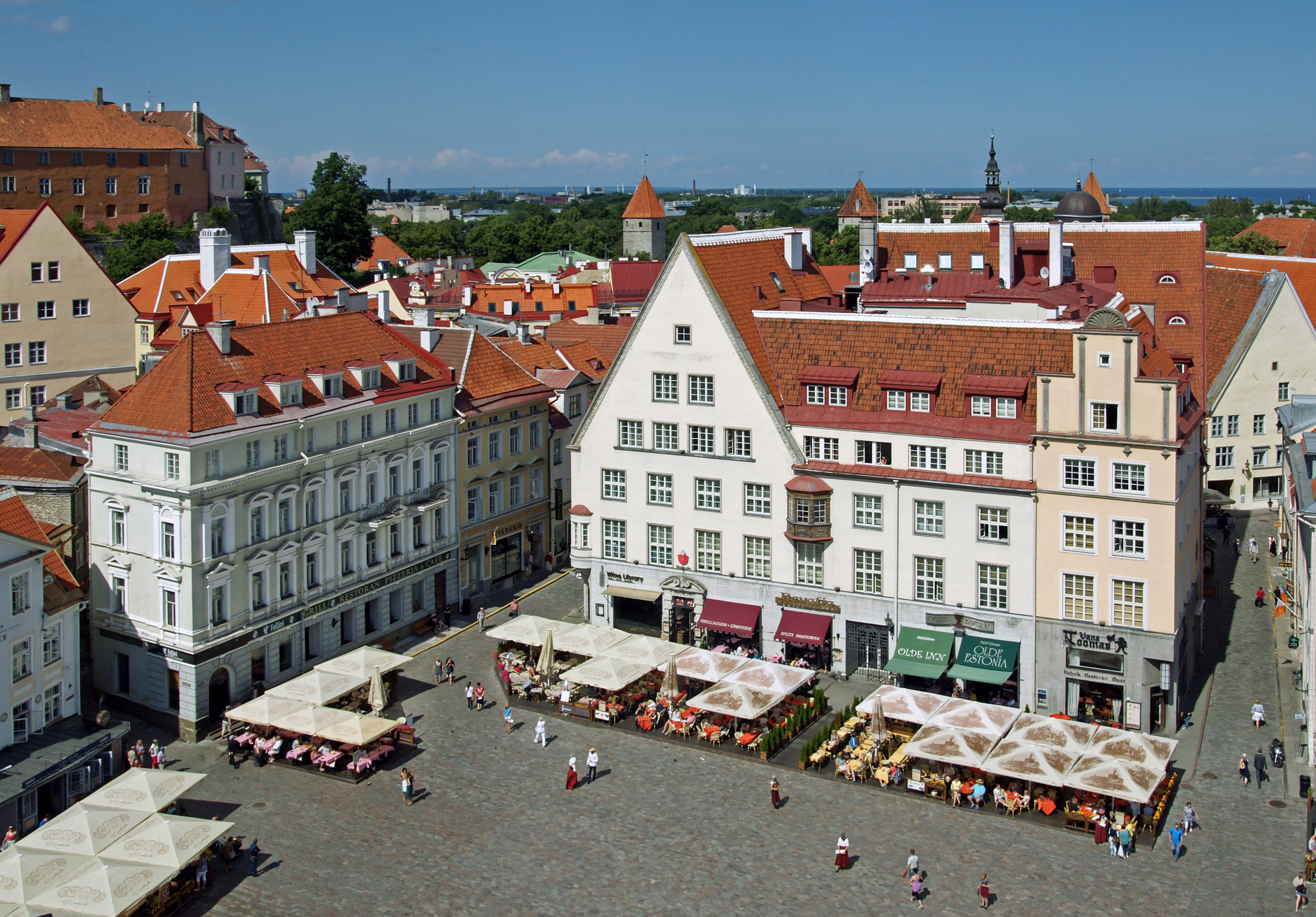
The city of Tallinn is one of the locations of interest visited by tourists in Estonia

Tourism in Estonia refers to the overall state of the tourism industry in the Baltic nation of Estonia. It is a key part of the country's economy, contributing 7.8% to its GDP, and employing 4.3% of its population. In 2018, tourism and other related services counted for over 10.8 percent of Estonia's exports. Tourism is increasing rapidly in Estonia: the number of tourist arrivals—both domestic and international—has increased from 2.26 million in 2006 to 3.79 million in 2019. Estonia was also ranked the 15th-most safest country to visit in 2017, according to safedestinations.com, scoring 8.94 out of 10 on their list. In a 2018 report published by the OECD, they concluded that most international tourists come from places like Finland, Russia, Latvia, Germany, and Sweden.

Tourist arrivals of 2024 in %

National tourism in Estonia is managed by the Ministry of Economic Affairs and Communications (Estonian: Majandus- ja Kommunikatsiooniministeerium), which works closely with the national tourist agency, the Estonian Tourist Board. In 2014, the Government of Estonia announced the National Tourist Development Plan, a project meant to invest 123 million euros into the Estonian travel industry, meant to last until 2020. After 2020, when the plan ended, the Ministry announced a new plan starting from 2021 and ending in 2024, entitled the "Tourism Programme 2021–24", with help from the Ministry of Education and Research.

In the context of tourism in general, Estonia, along with other Baltic states, is considered a newly-freed Eastern Bloc nation with a rich history and untouched nature. Popular destinations in Estonia include the national capital of Tallinn, Tartu, Pärnu, and Saaremaa, of which the Old Town in Tallinn is a designated UNESCO World Heritage Site. Additionally, Estonia is also a popular destination for foreign students: 5,528 students from external countries studied in Estonia, mostly from neighboring countries, but also occasionally from places like Azerbaijan, Nigeria, and India, comprising 12.2% of all students in Estonia.

== History ==
International arrivals in Estonia
Year	Number of tourists
1995	530,000
1996	665,000
1997	730,000
1998	825,000
1999	950,000
2000	1,220,000
2001	1,320,000
2002	1,362,000
2003	1,462,000
2004	1,750,000
2005	1,917,000
2006	1,940,000
2007	1,900,000
2008	2,222,000
2009	2,180,000
2010	2,511,000
2011	2,823,000
2012	2,957,000
2013	3,111,000
2014	3,160,000
2015	2,961,000
2016	3,131,000
2017	3,245,000

The land in what is known as Estonia has historically had a long tradition of seafaring and trade dating as far back as the Hanseatic League.

=== Early years: Mid 19th century–1945 ===
The history of modern tourism in Estonia dates back to the mid-19th century, when it was part of the Russian Empire. Various holiday resorts where established in the area during that time. These resorts were built primarily for the bureaucrats and wealthy of St. Petersburg, Moscow, and other Russian cities. After World War I and the October Revolution, Estonia became an independent nation in 1918. The Estonian Society Of Tourists, an organization dedicated to the promotion of domestic and international tourism in Estonia, was formed in 1920, and in 1930, the Central Management Office of Tourism was established hereafter to aid it.

=== Post-War and Soviet years: 1945–1991 ===
After Estonia's incorporation into the Soviet Union, its economy went through incredible change to adapt it to the communist ideology of the Soviets. Compared to other parts of the Soviet Union, Estonia was much more developed as a result of having been independent previously, and so the Soviets made use of this to develop various high-tech industries in Estonia. With the help of organizations like Intourist and substantial investment by the Soviet government, the Estonian tourism industry gradually revived. By the 1970s, Tallinn was the 5th-most popular place to visit for visitors to the Soviet Union.

=== Post-Soviet years: 1991–present ===
The Estonian tourism industry has developed rapidly since the dissolution of the Soviet Union, fuelled by the reopening of borders, the reinstatement of freedom of movement laws, and growing interest in Estonia as a tourism destination. The creation of the Estonian Tourist Board in 1990 to help implement new government policies for tourism in Estonia was also another major factor in all of this. By 1995, tourism services accounted for 20% of Estonia’s total exports. The Great Recession temporarily halted Estonian tourism growth, but since then the industry has been growing: the share of tourism had increased to 5% in the economy by 2016.

== Government funding, planning and organization ==
Government funding for tourism is usually carried out via approval of the Ministry of Economic Affairs and Communications, and is then relayed to the Estonian Tourist Board. Tourist funding is outlined in the National Tourism Development Plan (NTDP), first drawn up in 1998 as part of a wider strategy to grow the Estonian economy, along with the Tourism Act (Turismeadus) adopted in 2000. The NTDP has been continually revised; the most latest revision was in 2014.

In 1996, Estonia was divided into 4 main tourism regions: Tallinn (Old City), North (Baltic Sea), South (cultural heritage) and West (islands and coastal scenery). In the 1990s, most hotel providers were in Tallinn with 25% of all hotels and 49% of all beds.

== Rural tourism ==
Rural tourism in Estonia is also growing at a rapid pace, particularly among Japanese tourists. In 2014, 31% of foreign tourists in Estonia were nature tourists. Most rural tourism in Estonia are small businesses that offer accommodation, food, and holiday services. Like much of tourism in general, rural and nature tourism saw massive increases after Estonia's independence from the Soviet Union in 1990, along with the privatization of previously state-owned farms. Tourism farms are most common in the Võru County.

== Threats to tourism ==
=== "Vodka tourism" ===
"Vodka tourism" is a fast-growing industry in Estonia. Estonia has had a long history of vodka manufacturing since the 1700s, and it is considered one of the traditional vodka-producing countries, along with its neighbours. After the introduction of a passenger ferry service between the cities of Helsinki and Tallinn in 1968, "vodka tourism" started to emerge, as Finns often travelled to Estonia to get cheaper alcohol. However, many Estonians have also travelled to neighbouring countries, especially Latvia, to get even cheaper alcohol. This has cost the Estonian government around €30 million in 2017, and the Ministry of Finance has stated that if it continues, it may cause a €20 million "budget hole". Additionally, vodka tourism has also caused a negative reputation for Estonia as a tourism destination.

== See also ==
- Culture of Estonia
- Transport in Estonia
