= Limitrophe states =

Territory situated on a border or frontier

Limitrophe states are territories situated on a border or frontier. In a broad sense, it means border countries, any group of neighbors of a given nation which border one another thus forming a rim around that country. The English term derives from pays limitrophes, a term in diplomatic French.

In ancient Rome, the term referred to provinces at the borders of the Roman Empire (Latin: limitrophus), which were obliged to provide billeting of the limitanei legions deployed on their territory, mostly in limes.

In modern history, it was used to refer to provinces that seceded from the Russian Empire at the end of World War I, during the Russian Civil War (1917–1922), thus forming a kind of belt or cordon sanitaire separating Soviet Russia from the rest of Europe during the interwar period.

== 1918–1939 ==
Before the Treaty of Versailles was signed on 28 June 1919 and even afterward, it was still unclear which territories of the Russian Empire that were occupied by German troops or engaged in the Russian Civil War would maintain their independence, which they had started to proclaim in late 1917. Thus, the very composition of the limitrophe zone was uncertain and varied widely. The nations were then "the cards to change hands in big political games" and included the Baltic peoples, Poles, Lithuanians, Ukrainians, and Belarusians.

The usage of term "limitrophe states" continued after World War I. Treaties were signed until the beginning of World War II. The Small Soviet Encyclopedia (1929) defines the limitrophe states as "states formed from the outskirts of the former Tsarist Russia, mainly from the western provinces". It includes in its list Estonia, Latvia and Lithuania, adding "and, partially, Poland and Finland". Nine years later the Ushakov's Explanatory Dictionary (1938) also syntactically 'separates' Finland from the three Baltic States: ("Estonia, Lithuania, Latvia and Finland as well"). However, Poland is not mentioned.

== See also ==
- Border states (Eastern Europe)
- Buffer state
- Cordon sanitaire
- Intermarium
- Near abroad
- March (territory)
