= Buffer state =

Country between two powerful countries

A buffer state is a country geographically lying between two rival or potentially hostile great powers. Its existence can sometimes be thought to prevent conflict between them. A buffer state is sometimes a mutually agreed upon area lying between two greater powers, which is demilitarised in the sense of not hosting the armed forces of either power (though it will usually have its own military forces). The invasion of a buffer state by one of the powers surrounding it will often result in war between the powers.

Buffer states, when authentically independent, typically pursue a neutralist foreign policy, which distinguishes them from satellite states. The concept of buffer states is part of a theory of the balance of power that entered European strategic and diplomatic thinking in the 18th century. After the First World War, notable examples of buffer states were Poland and Czechoslovakia, situated between major powers such as Germany and the Soviet Union. Lebanon is another significant example, positioned between Syria and Israel, thereby experiencing challenges as a result.

== Effectiveness according to empirical research ==
Research shows that buffer states are significantly more likely to be conquered and occupied than nonbuffer states are. This is because "states that great powers have an interest in preserving—buffer states—are in fact in a high-risk group for death. Regional or great powers surrounding buffer states face a strategic imperative to take over buffer states: if these powers fail to act against the buffer, they fear that their opponent will take it over instead. By contrast, these concerns do not apply to nonbuffer states, where powers face no competition for influence or control."

A 2025 study by political scientist Douglas Lemke found that buffer states are more likely to lose wars than other states, contributing to their higher risk of losing their independence.

== Examples ==
=== Americas ===
- Bolivia, created by Gran Colombia as a buffer between Peru and Argentina during the Upper Peru question
- Uruguay, served as a demilitarised buffer between Argentina and the Empire of Brazil during the early independence period in South America
- Paraguay, maintained after the end of the Paraguayan War in 1870, as a buffer separating Argentina and Brazil
- Georgia, a colony established by Great Britain in 1732 as a buffer between its other colonies along the Atlantic coast of North America and Spanish Florida
- Ecuador, served as a "cushion state" between Colombia and Peru, which had a bigger extension and military force and fought a war in the 1820s.

=== Asia ===
- The Kingdom of Judah was a buffer state between Egyptian Empire and Neo-Babylonian Empire.
- Multiple buffer states played major roles during the Roman–Persian Wars (66 BC – 628 AD). Armenia was a frequently contested buffer between the Roman Empire (as well as the later Byzantine Empire) and the various Persian and Muslim states.
- Nanzhao was established as a buffer state between Tang China and Tibet.
- The Türgesh Khaganate was a buffer state between Tang China and the Umayyad Caliphate.
- Ryukyu was a buffer state between the Qing Empire and Edo Japan.
- North Korea, during and after the Cold War, has been seen by some analysts as a buffer state between the military forces of China, the Soviet Union and those of South Korea, Japan, and the United States (stationed in South Korea, Japan, and Taiwan from 1954 to 1979).
- Manchukuo was a pro-Japanese buffer state between the Empire of Japan, the Soviet Union, and the Republic of China during World War II.
- Thailand, historically known as Siam, was an independent buffer state between the British Raj, British Malaya, French Indochina, and their competing colonial interests in Laos and Cambodia.
- (Korean Empire) Korea acted as a buffer zone between the growing superpowers of Imperial Japan and the Russian Empire.
- The Far Eastern Republic was a formally independent state created to act as a buffer between Bolshevik Russia and the Empire of Japan.
- (Emirate of Afghanistan) Afghanistan was a buffer state between the British Empire, which ruled much of South Asia, and the Russian Empire, which ruled much of Central Asia, during the Anglo–Russian conflicts of the 19th century. Later, the Wakhan Corridor extended the buffer eastwards to the Chinese border.
- The Himalayan nations of Tibet, (Kingdom of Nepal) Nepal, Bhutan, and Sikkim were buffer states between the British Empire and China. Later, during the Sino-Indian War of 1962, they became buffers between China and India as the two powers fought along their borders.
- Mongolia acted as a buffer between the Soviet Union and China until 1991. It currently serves as a buffer between Russia and China.
- Lebanon is a buffer state between Israel and Syria.
- Iraq and Bahrain are buffer states between Iran and Saudi Arabia.

=== Africa ===
- Morocco served as a buffer state between the Ottoman Empire, Spain, and Portugal in the 16th century.
- The Bechuanaland Protectorate (present-day Botswana) was initially created as a buffer between the British Empire and the two Boer republics of the Orange Free State and the Transvaal Republic until the Second Boer War.

=== Europe ===
- Brigantia was a buffer state between the Roman Empire in Britain and the northern Celtic tribes.
- Principality of Transylvania was a buffer state between Ottoman Empire and Habsburg Empire until the Treaty of Karlowitz was signed.
- Switzerland has been a buffer state between Italy, Austria, France, Germany, and other state powers in medieval and modern Europe.
- The United Kingdom of the Netherlands, composed of today's Belgium and Netherlands, was created by the Congress of Vienna in 1815 to maintain peace between France, Prussia, and the United Kingdom. The kingdom existed for 15 years until the Belgian Revolution.
- Belgium acted as buffer state between France, the German Empire, the Netherlands, and the British Empire before the First World War.
- The Rhineland served as a demilitarised zone between France and Germany during the interwar years of the 1920s and early 1930s. There were early French attempts at creating a Rhenish Republic.
- The Socialist Soviet Republic of Byelorussia was founded as a buffer state between Soviet Russia and the European powers.
- The Qasim Khanate (1452–1681) may have served as a buffer between Muscovy and the Kazan Khanate.
- Austria acted as a buffer state between Germany and Italy during the interwar period.
- (Second Polish Republic) Poland and other states between Germany and the Soviet Union have sometimes been described as buffer states, both as non-communist states before World War II and later as communist states of the Eastern Bloc.
- (Socialist Federal Republic of Yugoslavia) Yugoslavia, which broke with the Soviet Union before the formation of the Warsaw Pact, became a buffer state between NATO and the Eastern Bloc during the Cold War.
- West Germany and East Germany were also regarded as buffer states between NATO and the Warsaw Pact during the Cold War in Europe.
- During the Cold War, Sweden and Finland were sometimes regarded as buffer states between NATO and the Soviet Union. More recently, the Russo-Ukrainian War has helped push both countries into joining NATO.
- Cyprus was created as a buffer state in 1960 to avert Greek and Turkish claims on the island.

=== Oceania ===
- New Hebrides served as a buffer between the United Kingdom and France in Oceania during the New Imperialism period.
- Papua New Guinea served as a buffer state between Indonesia, the Solomon Islands, and Vanuatu. Indonesia accused both the Solomon Islands and Vanuatu of supporting the Free Papua Movement during the Papua conflict.

== See also ==
- Indian barrier state, a British proposal to establish a Native American buffer state in the Great Lakes region of North America during the 18th and early 19th centuries
- Limitrophe states
- Neutral and Non-Aligned European States
- Puppet state
- Satellite state
