= List of battles of the Polish–Soviet War =

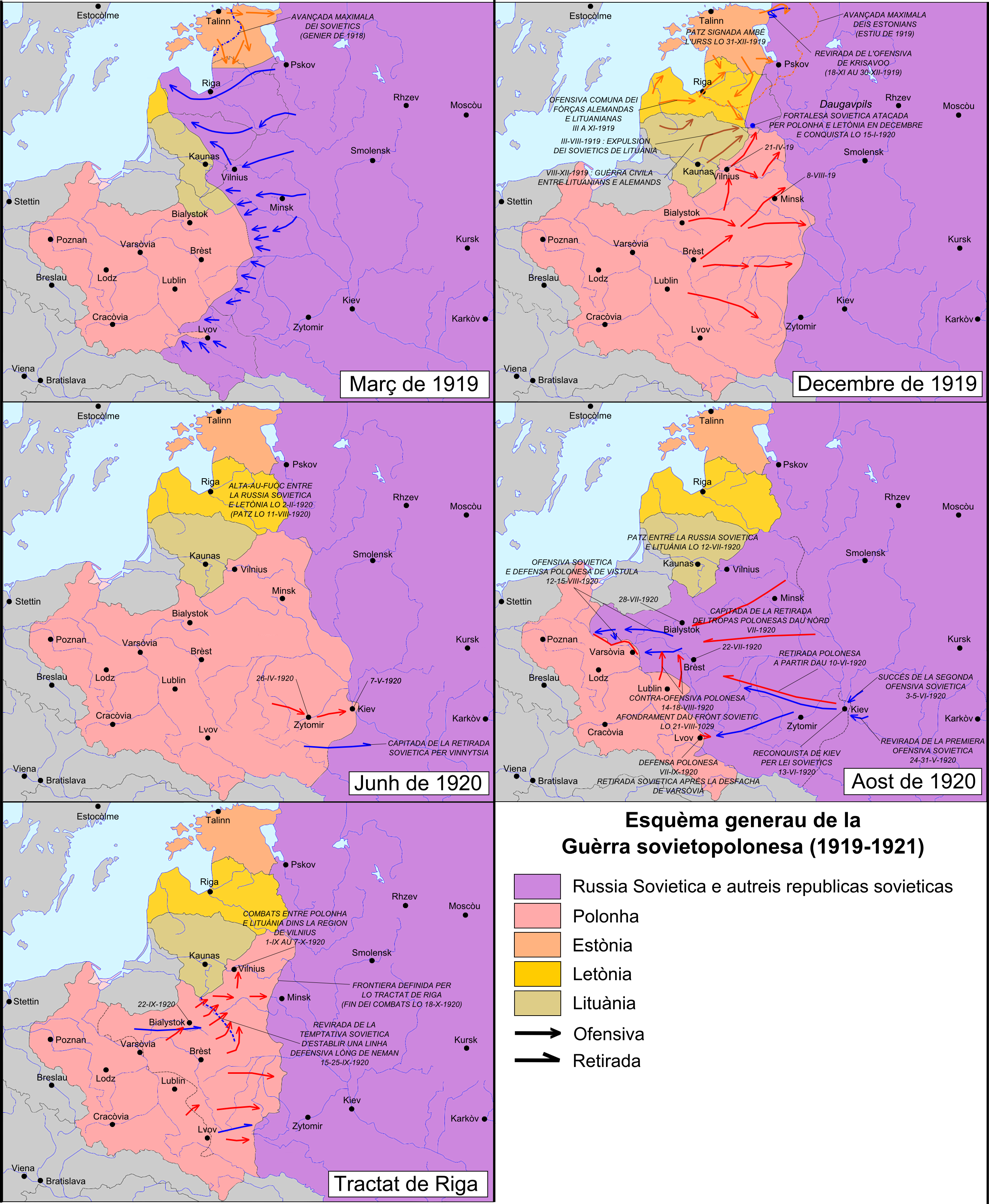
Phases in the Polish–Soviet War

List of battles of the Polish-Soviet War by chronology:

1. Battles for Vilnius (1918–1919) (31 December 1918 – 5 January 1919)
2. Soviet "Target Vistula" offensive (January–February 1919)
3. Battle of Bereza Kartuska (9 February 1919: the first battle of the conflict)
4. Battle of Pinsk (23 February – 5 March 1919)
5. Battle of Byteń (February – March 1919)
6. Battle of Barbarów (5 March 1919)
7. Battle of Gawinowicze (8 March 1919)
8. Battle of Hłybow (8 March 1919)
9. First Battle of Baranowicze (13–15 March 1919 and 13–19 April 1919)
10. Nieśwież uprising (14–19 March 1919)
11. Vilna offensive: Polish offensive to Vilna (April 1919)
12. First Battle of Lida (16-17 April 1919)
13. Battle of Stołowicze (1919) (16–19 April 1919)
14. Battle of Nowogródek (18 April 1919)
15. Battle of Staryki and Czernica (20 April 1919)
16. Battle of Święciany (1919) (13–14 May 1919)
17. Battle of Berezina (1919)
18. Battle of Rafałówka (June 1919)
19. Battle of Pastavy (1919) (19–21 June 1919)
20. Battle of Treszczyna (July 1919)
21. Operation Minsk: Polish offensive to Minsk (July–August 1919)
22. Battles of Chorupań and Dubno (19 July 1919)
23. Battle of Olszany (2 August 1919)
24. Battle of Małe Gajany (7 August 1919)
25. Battle of Sloboda (8–9 August 1919)
26. Battle of Daugavpils (1919) (20 August – 29 September 1919)
27. Battle of Polotsk (1919) (21 September – 4 November 1919)
28. Battle of Ziabki (1919) (22 August 1919)
29. Battle of the Daugava (1920) (29 August 1919 – January 1920)
30. Battle of Lepel (1919) (29 September 1919 – 5 November 1919, 13–16 November 1919)
31. Battle of Luboniczary (2 October 1919)
32. Battle of Kobylszczyzna (17 October 1919)
33. Battle of Kliczew (12-14 December 1919)
34. Battle of Sieliszcze (13–14 December 1919)
35. Battle of Dąbrowica (28 November 1919)
36. Battle of Romanów (23 December 1919)
37. Battle of Nowosiółki (28 December 1919)
38. Battle of Śnicka (January 1920)
39. Battle of Daugavpils - Joint Polish-Latvian operation (3 January 1920)
40. Battle of Pawłówka (22 January 1920)
41. Battle of Poliszczyn (23 January – 3 February 1920)
42. Battle of Itol (24 January 1920)
43. Battle of Kuźnicze (30 January 1920)
44. Battle of Borkowicze (5 February 1920)
45. First Battle of Ovruch (10–12 January 1920)
46. Battle of Stodolicz (16–17 February 1920)
47. Battle of Latyczów (18-22 February 1920)
48. Battle of Łuczanki (21 February 1920)
49. Battle of Kazimierzówka (24 February 1920)
50. Battle of Kalinkowicze (March – June 1920)
51. Battle of Mazyr and Kalenkowicze (4–6 March 1920)
52. Second Battle of Ovruch (7 March 1920)
53. Battle of Borowiki (17 March 1920 - April 4, 1920)
54. Battle of Wołkowińce (17 March 1920; 14 April 1920)
55. Battle of Stepanovka (19 March 1920)
56. Battle of Zwiahl (21 March 1920)
57. Battle of Jełan (4 – 5 April 1920, 3 May 1920, 7 May 1920)
58. Battle of Svietlahorsk (9–22 April 1920)
59. Battle of Strużka (11 April 1920)
60. Battle of Koziatyn (25–27 April 1920)
61. Battle of Czarnobyl (27 April 1920)
62. Battle of the Berezina (1920) (15 May 1920)
63. Kiev offensive (May–June 1920)
64. Battle of Wołodarka (29 May 1920)
65. Battle of Bystryk (31 May 1920)
66. Battle of Boryspil (2 June 1920)
67. Battle of Borodzianka (11-13 June 1920)
68. Battle of Głębokie (4-6 July 1920)
69. Battle of Barysaw (August - October 1919)
70. Battle of Mironówka
71. Battle of Olszanica
72. Battle of Żywotów
73. Battle of Miedwiedówka
74. Battle of Dziunków
75. Battle of Wasylkowce
76. Battle of Grodno (19-20 July 1920)
77. Battle of Brody and Berestechko (29 July – 3 August 1920)
78. Battle of Serock
79. Battle of Ostrołęka (2-6 August 1920)
80. Battle of Lwów (July–September 1920)
81. Battle of Tarnopol (31 July - 6 August 1920)
82. Battle of Warsaw (15 August 1920)
83. Battle of Nasielsk, Battle of Radzymin, Battle of Ossów, Battle of Borkowo, Battle of Kock (14–15 August 1920)
84. Battle of Cyców (15–16 August 1920)
85. Battle of Dęblin and Mińsk Mazowiecki (16–18 August 1920)
86. Battle of Zadwórze: the "Polish Thermopylæ" (17 August 1920)
87. Battle of Przasnysz (21–22 August 1920)
88. Battle of Sarnowa Góra (21–22 August 1920)
89. Battle of Białystok (22 August 1920)
90. Battle of Zamość (29 August 1920)
91. Battle of Komarów (31 August 1920)
92. Battle of Hrubieszów (1 September 1920)
93. Battle of Sejny (September 1920)
94. Battle of Kobryń (1920) (14–15 September 1920)
95. Battle of Dytiatyn (16 September 1920)
96. Battle of Brzostowica (20 September 1920)
97. Battle of the Niemen River (September 26–28, 1920)
98. Battles of Obuchowe and Krwawy Bór (27–28 September 1920)
99. Battle of Zboiska
100. Battle of Minsk (1920) (18 October 1920)
