= Jerzy Sosnkowski =

Polish architect (1894–1954)

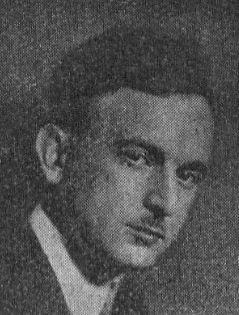
- Jerzy Sosnkowski in the 1930s
- Born: 23 October 1894; Warsaw, Russian Partition, Russian Empire
- Died: 10 December 1954 (aged 60); Buenos Aires, Argentina
- Education: Lviv Polytechnic
- Occupations: Modernist architect, designer, writer
- Spouse: Zofia Janicka
- Children: Wacław
- Parent(s): Zofia née Drabińska and Józef Bogdan Sosnkowski
- Awards

Jerzy Sosnkowski (23 October 1894 – 10 December 1954) was a Polish modernist architect, interior designer and writer.

== Biography ==
=== Youth ===
Jerzy Sosnkowski was born on 23 October 1894 in Warsaw from Zofia (née Drabińska) (1858–1938) and Józef Bogdan Sosnkowski (1832–1896), a wealthy nobleman and owner of several villages.

Gentry traditions and Polish patriotism were deeply honored in the family. Sosnkowski had three sisters and two brothers, in addition to five other half-siblings from his father's first marriage.

He attended the gymnasium on Złota Street in Warsaw. He then went to the private Polish Artur Jeżewski's School of Commerce (Szkoła Handlowa A. Jeżewskiego), where he passed his matura in June 1913. With his diploma, he left for Lviv to study architecture at Lviv Polytechnic which his brother Kazimierz was already attending.

There, he was a member of the local Riflemen's Association (Związek Strzelecki).

=== First World War and military service ===
On 2 October 1914, during the First World War, he enlisted as a corporal in the 1st Uhlan Regiment. He took part in the operations of the Austrian Army on the Russian front in the Lublin region and in Volhynia. In November 1915, he was temporarily released due to serious illness: he stayed in Sandomierz on the estate of his sister Wanda Chołocińska.

In March 1916, he transferred to Warsaw, in order to resume his studies at the Faculty of Architecture of the Warsaw University of Technology (Wydział Architektury Politechniki Warszawskiej), under the supervision of architect Czesław Przybylski. In September 1918, he passed the semi-graduate exam.

After Poland regained independence, Sosnkowski joined the 2nd Rokitnian Chevau-léger regiment as a volunteer, taking part in the winter campaign on the Volhynian front. From June to September 1919, he took a course at the Officer Cadet School in Warsaw and was accordingly promoted to second lieutenant; he was sent posted to the Staff of the Ministry of Military Affairs. He eventually ended his military service in September 1921.

Sosnkowski was rewarded the Cross of Independence on 12 May 1931, for "work in the effort to regain Independence".

In 1934, as an ancient mobilized officer, he was listed in the records of the 3rd Recruitment District Command of Warsaw, a military body responsible in particular for the administration of reserves. As such, Sosnkowski was assigned to the Reserve Officers' District Nr I, with the rank of lieutenant, "intended to be called back in wartime".

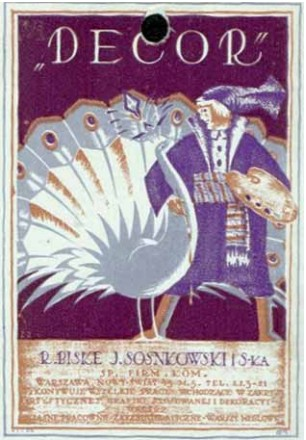
Advertising leaflet of the company "DECOR", 1921

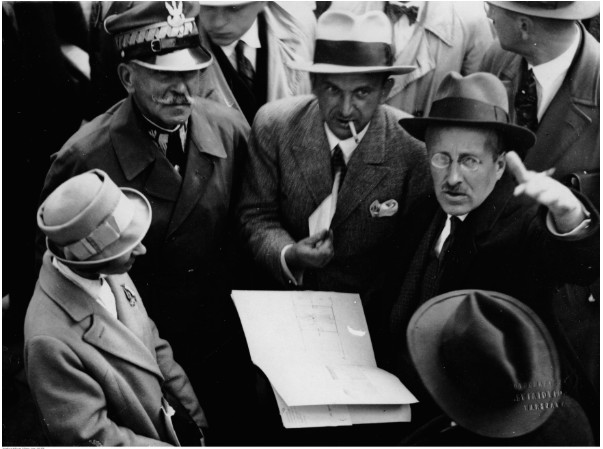
Sosnkowski smoking (facing the camera) at the Artistic and technical committee of the Maritime and River League, 1930

=== Art studies and works ===
In 1917, Sosnkowski co-submitted several stamp designs, in the framework of the competition for the postal marks of the Kingdom of Poland.

Around 1921, together with Franciszek Biske (1895–1938), also a student of the Faculty of Architecture at the Warsaw University of Technology, he founded the company "DECOR", which performed all types of works within the scope of applied artistic graphics and interior decoration.

From 1923 to 1931, he was an artistic inspector of the Warsaw City Council.

In Warsaw, Sosnkowski was actively involved in many artistic fields, staying several months for a course at the École des Beaux-Arts in Paris. At the time, he had been already identified by Józef Gawlikowski, a Warsaw Publishing House editor, as (...) "a successful architect, a theatre painter and interior decorator, an illustrator and a draftsman, appreciated in England."

He graduated on 31 June 1929, obtaining a diploma from the Department of Monumental Design, under the supervision of Czesław Przybylski. Right after (1930), he designed together with Juliusz Żórawski his first project, the Atlantic movie theater in Warsaw.

In 1927, he was part of the management team dealing with competitions organized at the Warsaw International Exhibition of Cinematographic Art (Międzynarodowa Wystawa Sztuki Kinematograficznej, Warszawa).

He became also a member of the Association of Polish Architects. Thanks to his brother's connections, Jerzy received military commissions from the Military Quartering Fund (Fundusz Kwaterunku Wojskowego, FKW) which resulted in the construction of several military residential houses, according to his designs (1929–1937). He created as well designs for furniture.

Together with Czesław Piaskowski, a Polish set designer and decorator, he created the scenography for the movie Rycerze mroku (Knights of Darkness), directed by Bruno Bredschneider and Stefan Szwarc in 1932. In this period, he also designed theatre sets (operettas) and interiors. Namely, the interior of the Żywiec restaurant in Warsaw was distinctive with its streamlined shapes, used in both architectural elements and furniture.

Thanks to his knowledge of foreign languages (French, German, Russian) and his artistic capabilities, Sonskowski travelled at length and published a number of articles in Tygodnik Illustrowany (The Illustrated Weekly), often with his own illustrations: Lviv (1922), Borysław oil basin (1925), Lublin (1927), Hutsulshchyna (1928), the French Riviera (1925), Czechoslovakia (1925), Denmark (1926), Amsterdam (1928), Venice (1932).

=== Second World War and post-war years ===
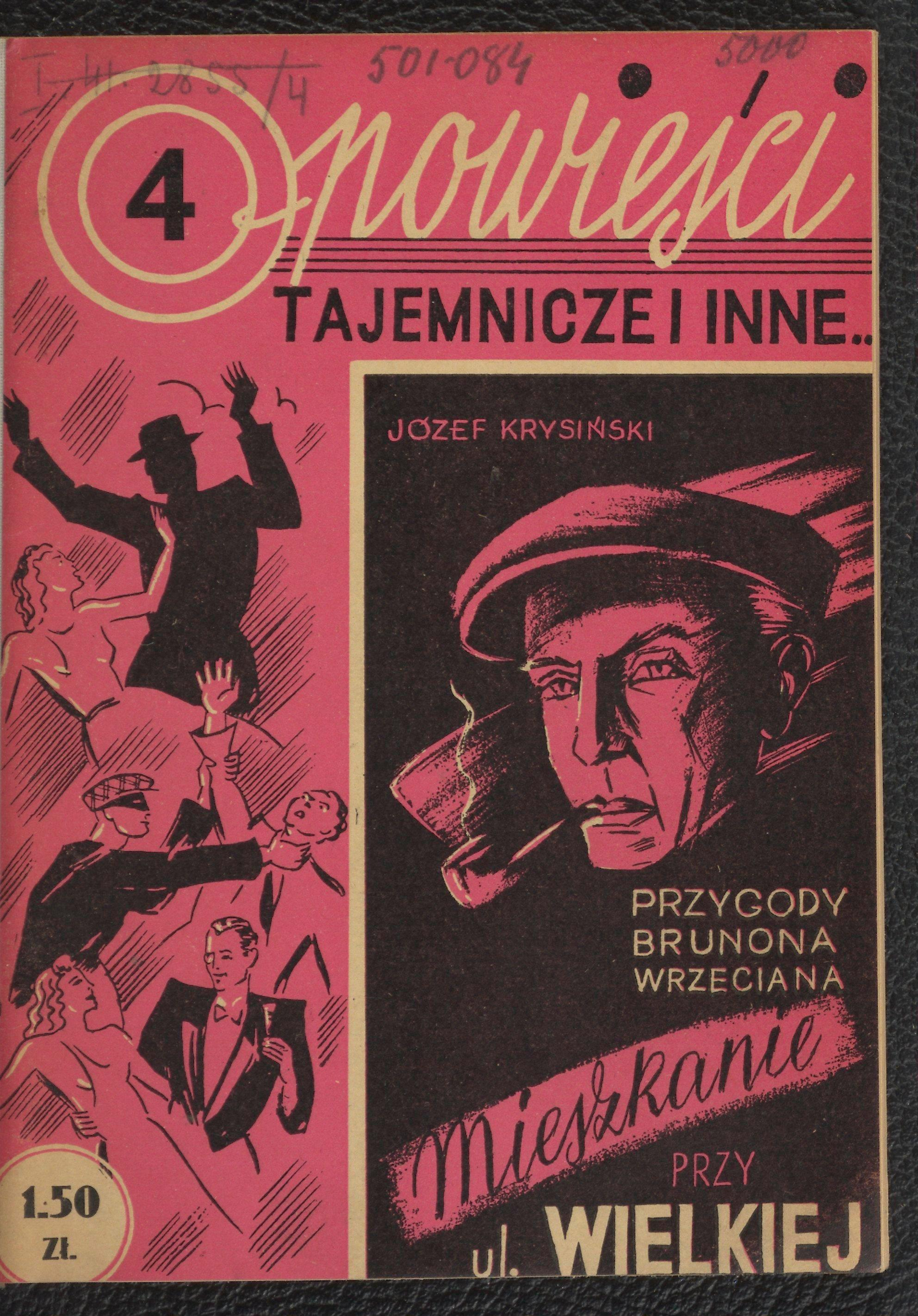
Cover of the book "Mieszkanie przy ul. Wielkiej"

Sosnkowski survived the war in occupied Warsaw. His activity during the conflict was very low: the only known works are illustrations for Józef Krysiński's thriller Mieszkanie przy ul. Wielka, published in Warsaw in 1941. He was arrested by the Gestapo on charges of commanding a combat action in Radom and then released in 1944. In spring, the same year, his wife left to Lisbon.

Released in October from a Kraków prison, he fled the advancing Red Army towards Germany in early 1945. He was arrested in Nuremberg by the 3rd American Army, identified and evacuated by plane on 27 May to Paris. Living in camps between France and England, Sosnkowski decided in the middle of 1947 to emigrate to Argentina, where he arrived on 20 July 1947, in Campaña, near Buenos Aires. In parallel, his brother, Kazimierz, had left Poland for Canada.

During his stay in exile, he first participated in Polish community life before stepping out of it. Sosnkowski lived in an unfinished house in the district of Aguila Blanca in Merlo near the capital city, financially supported by friendly neighbors. During this period, he intensively created lead drawings and watercolours on architectural themes from cities of pre-war Poland. These works are now exhibited at the Polish Library in Buenos Aires.

He died in the district of Merlo on 10 December 1954.

His achievements, architectural, design and artistic projects were presented in a multimedia exhibition organized in the Dom Polski-Casa Polaca (Polish house), in Buenos Aires in October 2023.

== Publications ==
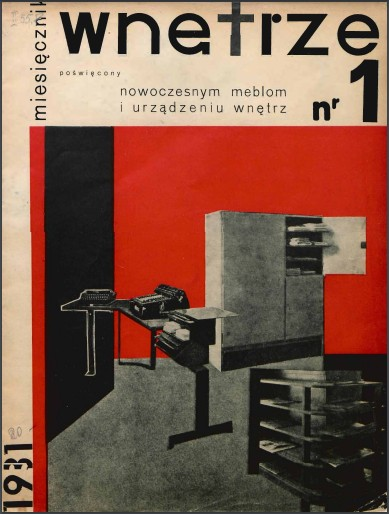
Cover of "Wnetrze" magazine Nr1 1931

In 1931, he co-founded the magazine Wnętrze (Interior) and led it as the editor-in-chief till 1934. The aim of the publication was to promote modern, avant-garde forms, as well as to promote the best architects and designers, and to advertise professional construction companies and various manufacturers related to this field. Some of his articles on architecture and urban space appeared in the daily Kurier Warszawski. Wnętrze's last issue was published in 1936.

Sosnkowski created illustrations, cartoons and articles (more than 180) for the Tygodnik Illustrowany and for Naokoło Świata, a series of travel literature published by the State Publishing House "Iskra".

In addition, he gave serial story lectures broadcast on the radio, such as Urządzanie wnętrz mieszkaniowych (Home interior design) in 1927 or Uroda miast portowych (The beauty of port cities) in 1929.

Sosnkowski also wrote novels, short stories or illustrated other authors books. This activity mainly happened before his architectural graduation (1929).

In his books, Sosnkowski tackled fantasy themes, writing about still undiscovered territories, or in the case of a series of short stories Żywe powietrze, about monsters, threats from space beings in space and creatures resembling characters from H.P. Lovecraft novels. In addition, his works ridiculed satirically Janusz Meissner's style.

== Works and projects ==
=== Buildings ===
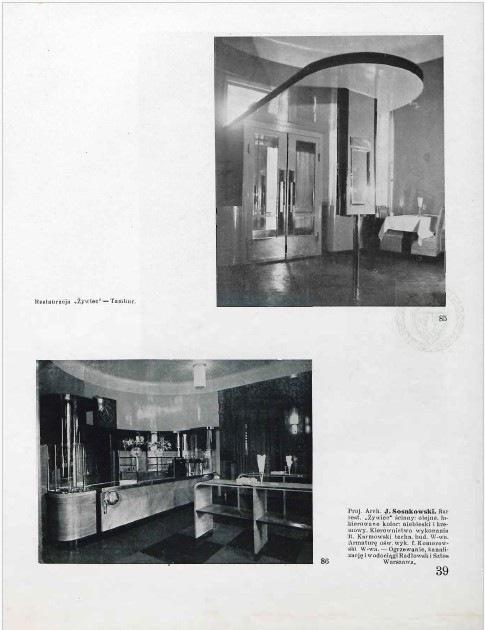
"Żywiec" restaurant, interior, 1933

- Casino cinema-theatre, co-designer, at 50 Nowy Świat street, Warsaw (1926).
- Officers' House at today's 8 Zegrzyńska street in Legionowo (1929).
- Officers' House in Stanisławów (1929).
- Atlantic movie theater in Warsaw, co-designed with Juliusz Żórawski (1930). It was the first modern sound cinema in Poland.
- Żywiec restaurant, Warsaw (1932).
- Non-Commissioned Officers' House in the Rembertów district of Warsaw (1934).
- Non-Commissioned Officers' House at 10a Dymińskiego street, Żoliborz district, Warsaw (1935).
- Officers' Houses and commander's house in Góra Kalwaria (c. 1937)

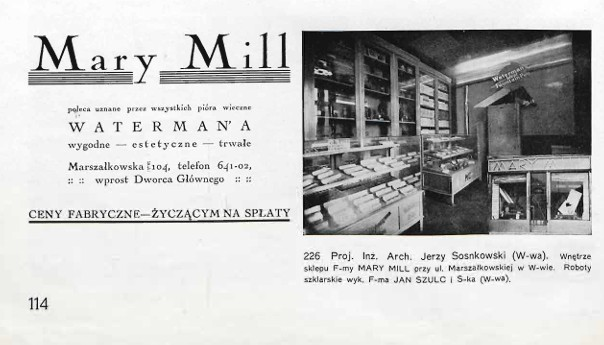
"Mary mill" store, interior, 1933

=== Scenography ===
- Set up for operettas at the Nowy Teatr in Warsaw: Japonka by Ralph Benatzky (March 1922), Hallali by Albert Szirmai (May 1922), Das Autoliebchen by Jean Gilbert (June 1922).
- Movie Rycerze mroku (1932).

=== Interior designs ===
- Design of Ferdinand Foch's marshal's baton, when the latter received the title of Marshal of Poland (1923).
- Żywiec restaurant at 36 Jerozolimskie avenue, Warsaw (1932) - non existent.
- Interior design for the MARY MILL store at 104 Marszałkowska street, Warsaw (1933) - non existent.
- Furniture for the Polish high Military Academy (1933).

=== Books ===
- Czerwone wyłogi: szkice i obrazki (Red Lapels: Sketches and Pictures) (1917) – a collection of short stories from his battle experiences during World War I
- Jednodniówka akademicka (One-Day Academic) (1918)
- Dom filozofów (Philosophers' House) – short stories (1923)
- Auto, ty i ja (The Car, You and Me) – short stories (1925)
- Bosman Finta (Boatswain Finta) – dedicated to his brother Kazimierz; short stories (1926)
- Żywe powietrze (Living Air) – novel (1926)
- Radjomiłość (Radio Love) – novel (1927)
- Żywy sen (Living Dream), Latający dywan (Flying Carpet), Na ognistym wozie (On a Fiery Cart), W kuchni wieloryba (In the Whale's Kitchen), Białe Orlę (White Eagle) and Krew ziemi (The Blood of the Earth) (1928) – didactic patriotic readings included in an anthology for school youth, commissioned by the Książnica-Atlas publishing house

== Personal life ==
- Sosnkowski was issued from the Godziemba noble family, whose origin goes back to the 11th century.
- He was the younger brother of General Kazimierz Sosnkowski (1885–1969), a Polish independence fighter, general and diplomat. Kazimierz was a major political figure and an accomplished commander, notable in particular for his contributions during the Polish–Soviet War and World War II. After the death of General Władysław Sikorski in July 1943, Sosnkowski became commander-in-chief of the Polish Armed Forces.
- His wife, Zofia Janicka, remained in Paris after 1945, where she worked as a milliner. In 1951, she received a visa for permanent residence in Rio de Janeiro and lived there unil the beginning of the 1960s. She then moved to New York City, where died in 1965. She regularly collaborated with the Józef Piłsudski Institute of America in New York City.
- The couple had a son, Wacław.

== See also ==
- Kazimierz Sosnkowski
- Juliusz Żórawski
- List of Polish people

== Bibliography ==
- Błaszczyk, Dariusz (2023). Brat generała. Jerzy Sosnkowski (1893–1954) [The general's brother. Jerzy Sosnkowski (1893–1954)] (in Polish). Warsaw: Fundacja Centrum Architektury. ISBN 978-83-969081-3-1.
- Błaszczyk, Dariusz (2023). Sosnkowski Jerzy. Słownik artystów polskich i obcych w Polsce działających (zmarłych przed 1966 r.). Malarze, rzeźbiarze, graficy. Tom XI [Sosnkowski Jerzy. Dictionary of Polish and foreign artists active in Poland (deceased before 1966). Painters, sculptors, graphic artists. Volume XI] (in Polish). Warsaw: Instytut Sztuki PAN. pp. 494–501.
- Łoza, Stanisław (1939). Czy wiesz kto to jest? Uzupełnienia i sprostowania [Do you know who this is? Additions and corrections] (in Polish). Warsaw: Drukarnia Wydawnicza Warszawa. p. 287.
