= Battle of Stołowicze (1919) =

- Part of Polish–Soviet War
Date	April 16–19, 1919
Location	Stołowicze
Result	Polish victory

Belligerents
Poland	Russian SFSR

Commanders and leaders
Aleksander Boruszczak; Franciszek Ostrowski	Unknown

Units involved
81st Grodno Rifle Regiment; 23rd Grodno Uhlan Regiment and The 79th Infantry Regiment	4th Revolutionary Warsaw Regiment

Casualties and losses
3 Grodno riflemen killed, 7 wounded	46 killed, many wounded, many POWs

Battle of Stołowicze took place between the group of Colonel Aleksander Boruszczak and Colonel Franciszek Ostrowski and the units of the Western Rifle Division fought in the early period of the Polish-Bolshevik War.

== Background ==
In the last months of 1918 and early 1919, German Ober Ost units were stationed on the eastern fringes of the territories claimed by the reborn Polish Republic. Their evacuation meant that the areas they left were occupied by the Red Army from the east. At the same time, units of the reborn Polish Army were approaching from the west. In February 1919, Polish troops came into combat contact with Red Army units. The undeclared Polish–Soviet War began. During this period, Polish troops carried out limited offensive operations. In mid-February, the Polish-Soviet front was established on the line of the Shchara River. On 26 March 1919, Marshal Józef Piłsudski presented a plan for an attack towards Vilnius in Brest. The plan also envisaged a demonstration strike on Baranavichy, Lida and Navahrudak. These were to divert the attention of the Soviet Western Rifle Division command from the strike's main direction towards Vilnius.

The task of capturing Baranavichy and Navahrudak was entrusted to General Adam Mokrzecki. He had at his disposal nine infantry battalions, the 3rd and 9th Uhlan Regiments, Major Dąbrowski's cavalry group and three artillery batteries. The main task was carried out by Colonel Aleksander Boruszczak's group.

== The Battle ==
On 15 April, Colonel Borushchak's group marching towards Baranovichi encountered, in the area of Stolovichi, the 2nd Brigade of the Soviet Western Rifle Division.

The next day, a squadron of Grodno lancers captured Stołowicze. On 17 April, at dawn, a counterattack by Soviet sailors drove the Polish uhlans out of the village. Ensign Stanislaw Soltan, who was covering the retreat, was captured and bestially murdered. Threatened by encirclement, the entire left wing of Colonel Aleksander Boruszczak's group retreated. In order to control the situation, the command of the Lithuanian-Byelorussian Division organised a tactical group consisting of the Grodno Rifle Regiment, two companies of the Bialystok Rifle Regiment, a battalion of the People's Militia and a cannon of the 7th Field Artillery Regiment. In total, the group had about 700 "bayonets" and 53 "sabres", 4 heavy machine guns, 4 mine throwers and 1 cannon. The commander of such an organised group, Colonel Franciszek Ostrowski[a] received orders to encircle Stolovichi from the north, capture the town and cut off the retreat of the Soviet troops fighting with Colonel Boruszczak's group.

The group set off in the evening of 18 April and marched through the forests towards Podstarzyki - Cukantowcze - Zapole. During the night of April 18–19 it approached Stolovichi. The group adopted the following battle formation: the Grodno regiment stood east of the Zapole - Stolovichi road; two companies of the Bialostocki ps were east of the Grodno regiment, Lieutenant Stanislaw Czuczelowicz's uhlans patrolled in the direction of Torczyce - Koldychev - Horodyszcze, while the 8th People's Militia battalion remained in reserve in Tsukantovichi. Major Bronislaw Bohaterewicz arranged the Grodno riflemen for the assault as follows: in the first line on the right wing stood the 2nd company and on the left wing the 4th company. In the 2nd line the NCO school and the 3rd company were to attack. The regiment was to strike directly from the north through the farmstead of Stolovichi, and the Bialystok companies were given the task of encircling the town from the northeast to close the enemy's retreat to Torczyce.

As planned, at 3.30 a.m. the strike group launched an attack from the north and north-east. In the morning the Grodno riflemen broke through the defences of the Soviet Warsaw rifle regiment and cavalry squadron. The Soviet troops withdrew from the city

== Balance of the Fight ==
Polish troops captured Stolovichi and pressed on towards Baranovichi. The Bolshevik losses were 46 killed, many wounded and many were taken as prisoners of war. Polish casualties - 3 Grodno riflemen killed (Jerzy Krysiuk, Leon Łączyński, and Antoni Petelczyc) and 7 were wounded.

== Bibliography ==
- Cisek, Janusz; Paduszek, Konrad; Rawski, Tadeusz (2010). Wojna polsko-sowiecka 1919-1921 (in Polish). Warsaw: Wojskowe Centrum Edukacji Obywatelskiej. ISBN 9788362345168.
- Odziemkowski, Janusz (1998). Leksykon wojny polsko-rosyjskiej 1919-1920 (in Polish). Warsaw: Rytm. ISBN 8385621466.
- Wysocki, Wiesław (2005). Szlakiem oręża polskiego: vademecum miejsc walki (in Polish). Warsaw: Rytm. ISBN 837399050X.
- Wyszczelski, Lech (2011). Wojna o polskie Kresy 1918-1921 (in Polish). Warsaw: Bellona. ISBN 9788311128668.
- Dąbrowski, Jerzy (1928). Zarys historii wojennej 81-go pułku Strzelców Grodzieńskich (in Polish). Warsaw: Wojskowe Biuro Historyczne.
- Lista strat Wojska Polskiego. Polegli i zmarli w wojnach 1918-1920 (in Polish). Warsaw: Wojskowe Biuro Historyczne. 1934.
- Waligóra, Bolesław (1928). Dzieje 85-go pułku Strzelców Wileńskich (in Polish). Warsaw: Wojskowy Instytut Naukowo-Wydawniczy.
