= Battle of Baranowicze (1919) =

1919 battle between the USSR and Poland

Battles of Baranowicze (1919)
- Part of Polish–Soviet War
Date	March 13–15, 1919; April 13–19, 1919
Location	Baranavichy (now Belarus)
Result	Polish victory

Belligerents
Poland	Russian SFSR

Commanders and leaders
Jerzy Dąbrowski; Aleksander Boruszczak	Unknown

The battles of Baranowicze were the battles of Capt. Jerzy Dąbrowski's group in March and Col. Aleksander Boruszczak's group in April 1919 against the Red Army units fought in the early period of the Polish–Soviet War.

== Background ==
In the last months of 1918 and early 1919, German Ober Ost units were stationed on the eastern fringes of the territories claimed by the reborn Polish Republic. Their evacuation meant that the areas they left were occupied by the Red Army from the east. At the same time, units of the reborn Polish Army were approaching from the west. In February 1919, Polish troops came into combat contact with Red Army units. The undeclared Polish–Soviet War began. During this period, Polish troops carried out limited offensive operations. In mid-February, the Polish-Soviet front was established on the line of the Shchara River.

== First Battle (March 13–15, 1919) ==
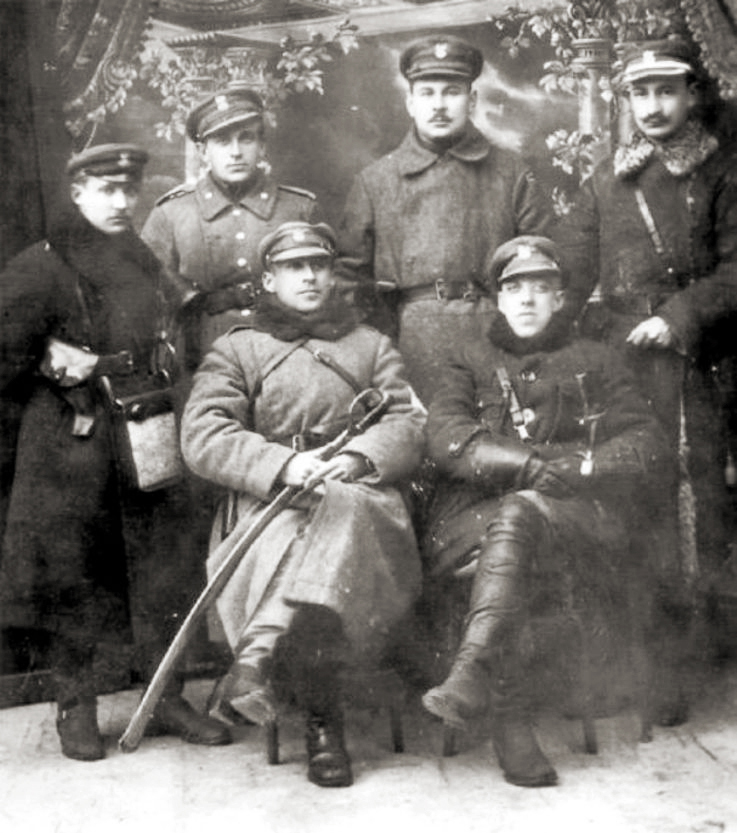
Command of the volunteer unit of the Dąbrowski brothers - February 1919. Sitting (from left): Major Władysław Dąbrowski, and Captain Jerzy Dąbrowski.

On 13 March, the Lithuanian–Belarusian Division's commander, General Stanisław Szeptycki, ordered Capt. Jerzy Dąbrowski's cavalry group, consisting of two squadrons of the 13th Uhlan Regiment, a collective squadron of the 10th Uhlan Regiment and a squadron of the 3rd Uhlan Regiment to perform a raid in the enemy rear in the area of Baranavichy. The group passed through the forests and damaged the railway track near Haradzyeya on the 15 of March. The following day, Polish Uhlans captured the railway station and the town of Siniaŭka, capturing a military train in the process. At the same time, a technical squadron destroyed bridges, disrupting the traffic between Baranavichy and Luninyets. On the night of 16 March, the regiment reached Haradzišča and, after a night's rest, began the march to Novaja Myš. From here, they attacked Baranavichy and captured it. The attack and capture of the railway station caused panic and confusion in the rear of the Soviet troops. On the 20 of March, the Polish breakout group returned to the Štarka River.

A press release from the General Staff of 19 March 1919 reported

A combined detachment under the command of Captain Jerzy Dąbrowski destroyed the railway line, causing an enemy train to derail near Sieniawka. After a detour through Horodziej, Iszkołdź and Horodyszcze, he reached Baranowicze and unexpectedly met the Bolshevik troops there. After a short and energetic battle, he scattered the Red Guards, who were frightened by the unexpected attack, took many prisoners and captured a large cache of weapons, ammunition and war material.

== Second Battle (April 13–19, 1919) ==
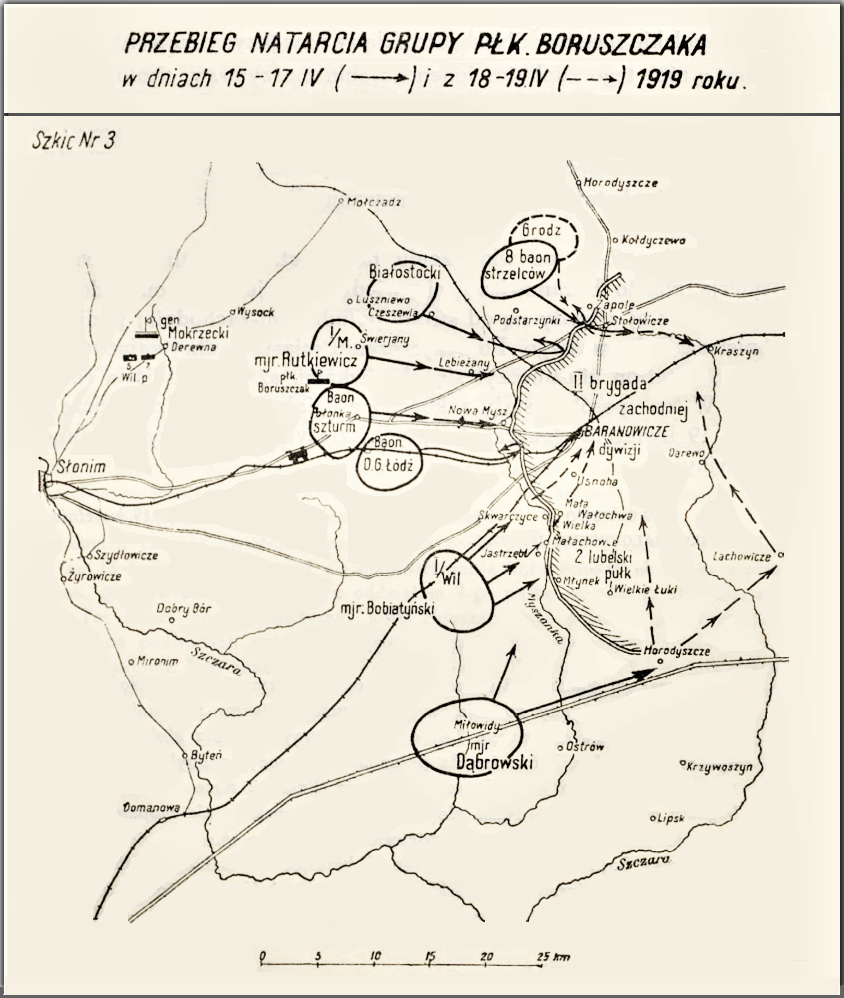
Assault on Baranavichy by the group of Colonel Aleksander Boruszczak

On 26 of March 1919, Marshal Józef Piłsudski presented a plan for an attack towards Vilnius in Brest. The plan also envisaged a demonstration strike on Baranavichy, Lida and Navahrudak. These were to divert the attention of the Soviet Western Rifle Division command from the strike's main direction towards Vilnius.

The task of capturing Baranavichy and Navahrudak was entrusted to General Adam Mokrzecki. He had at his disposal nine infantry battalions, the 3rd and 9th Uhlan Regiments, Major Dąbrowski's cavalry group and three artillery batteries. The main task was carried out by Colonel Aleksander Boruszczak's group. The group's commander divided his shock grouping into four columns. Forming the northern wing of the grouping, Col. Stefan Pasławski's unit, consisting of three battalions and two batteries, moved towards Cieszewla and Białolese, Capt. Witold Komierowski's assault battalion, Major Stanisław Bobiatyński with the 1st Vilnius Rifle Battalion advanced on Baranavichy from the south-west; the unit of Major Wladyslaw Dąbrowski, consisting of three squadrons of Vilnius uhlans, two battalions of the Lida rifle regiment, was to encircle Baranavichy from the south-east. At Baranavichy, the Soviet division's 1st Brigade, consisting mostly of Poles, defended itself with about 3,000 soldiers and 8 guns. There were 3 companies and 2 cavalry squadrons in Navahrudak and Navayelnya, 1 battalion in Horodyszcze, 1 squadron in Tsfevly, 1 company in Novy Misha, 2 companies and 2 squadrons in Kuntsevichy, Malakhovce and Mlynek. The enemy deployed advanced outposts in Swierjany, Polonka and Niebytes. In addition, the Soviets used field fortifications from the First World War. The largest enemy grouping was stationed in Baranavichy. The Soviet brigade headquarters were also located here.

On the 13 of April, the Polish offensive was launched, but after three days of heavy fighting, it was broken up over the Myszanka River. There was a shortage of ammunition, and even the artillery batteries, which had 15-20 shells left per gun, could not support the infantry effectively. As Poles were fighting on both sides of the front, more than once during breaks in battle, the soldiers made excuses to each other in Polish. The subordinates of Col. Aleksander Boruszczak called the opponents traitors, and the latter retaliated by calling them "bourgeoisie lackeys". In this position, the commander of the Lithuanian–Belarusian Division, General Stanislaw Szeptycki, reinforced General Mokrzecki's group with an infantry battalion from the General District of Łódź, a troop of Tatar cavalry and an artillery battery. The fighting units were also supplied with ammunition. The Soviets were also reinforcing their forces. The 10th Minsk Chekist regiment arrived at the front and drove away Colonel Paslawski's group from near Adamow.

On 18 April, Colonel Boruszczak resumed the assault with the forces of an assault battalion, the Lodz battalion and a squadron of the 10th Uhlan regiment. The assault on Nowa Mysz broke down, but successes were recorded on other sections of the front. Major Bobiatyński reached Uznoha, and Major Dąbrowski forced his way through the Myshanka, entered the gap and began a manoeuvre to bypass Baranavichy from the southeast. On April 19 the Grodno rifle regiment captured Stołowicze. On April 19th, an Capt. Komierowski's assault battalion of the Lithuanian–Belarusian Division reached the city, but tired from an all-night march, it failed to break through the enemy's defences. The outcome of the battle was determined by a daring charge by the 10th Uhlan Regiment, which charged the escaping troops, causing panic in the rear of the troops defending the city.

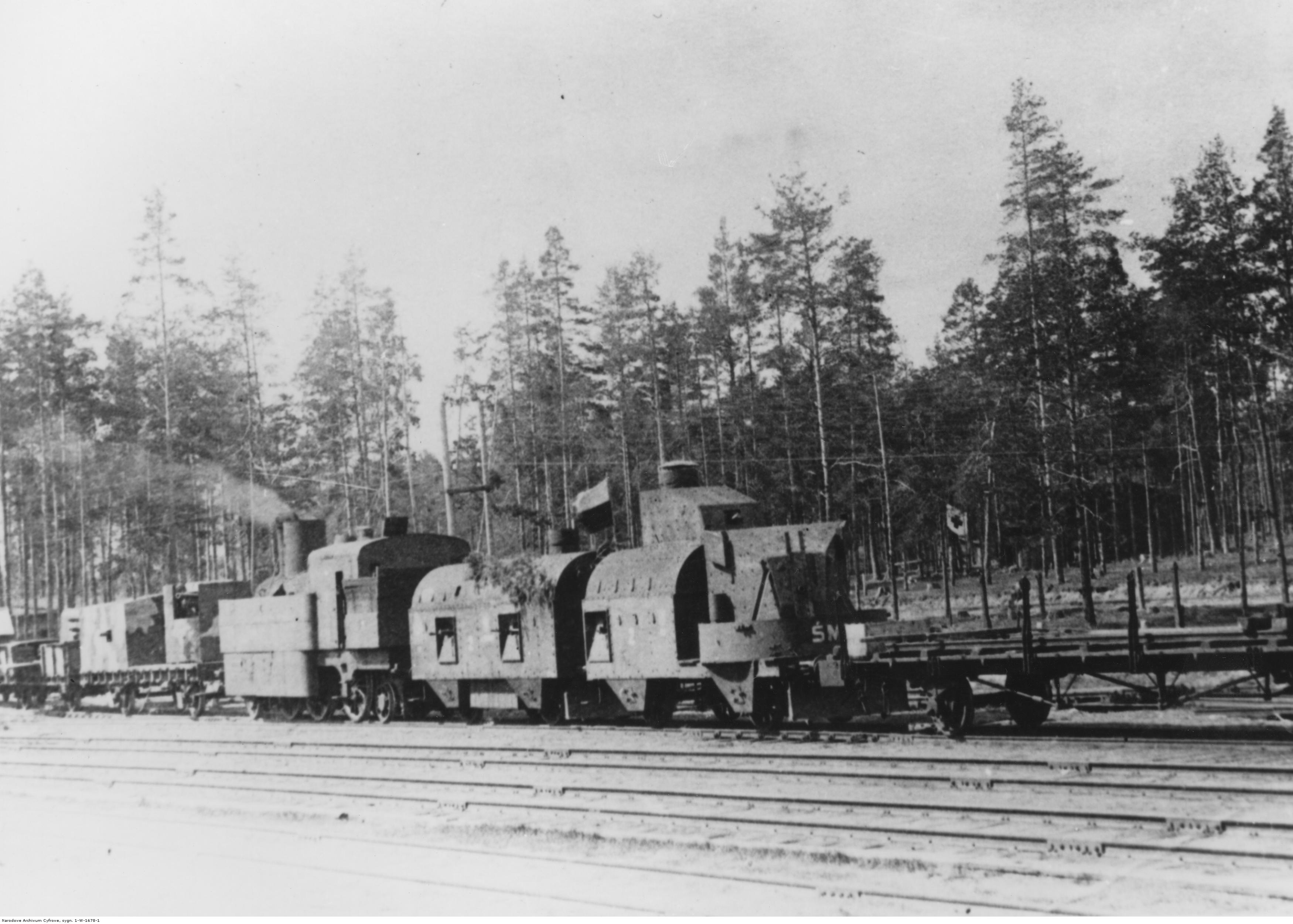
Armoured train "Śmiały"

A press release from the General Staff of 19 April 1919 reported:

The troops of General Mokrzecki's group, after a stubborn battle which lasted continuously for 5 days and 5 nights, captured Baranavichy on 19. IV. at 7 AM. The enemy put up exceptionally strong resistance. [...] Our heroic soldiers gave evidence of extraordinary valour and perseverance. Captain Komierowski's assault battalion and a battalion of the Vilnius Regiment, fighting with bayonets, and spreading panic, were the first to enter the city. The Białystok regiment attacked fortified enemy positions in Stolowicze, which were fiercely defended by sailors. With a daring attack, the sailors were driven from their positions, taking 140 prisoners and capturing 11 machine guns. Continuing the attack, our heroic units reached the railway line to Minsk, where they were met by Major Dąbrowski's cavalry, which advanced to the enemy rear from the direction of Darow. In the operation on Baranavichy, the lancers of Regiment 10, Rotmistrz Tomaszewicz, the Grodno uhlans, as well as the Śmiały II and Piłsudczyk armoured trains, rendered great service.

== Bibliography ==
- Cisek, Janusz; Paduszek, Konrad; Rawski, Tadeusz (2010). Wojna polsko-sowiecka 1919-1921 (in Polish). Warsaw. ISBN 9788362345168.
- Odziemkowski, Janusz (1998). Leksykon wojny polsko-rosyjskiej 1919-1920 (in Polish). Warsaw. ISBN 8385621466.
- Wysocki, Wiesław (2005). Szlakiem oręża polskiego: vademecum miejsc walki (in Polish). Warsaw. ISBN 837399050X.
- Wyszczelski, Lech (2011). Wojna o polskie Kresy 1918-1921 (in Polish). Warsaw. ISBN 9788311128668.
- A. P. Gritskevich. Western Front of the RSFSR 1918-1920. The struggle between Russia and Poland for Belarus. Minsk, Harvest, 2010. 496 p.

=== Polish regimental histories ===
- Aleksandrowicz, Stanisław (1929). Zarys historji wojennej 13-go pułku ułanów wileńskich (in Polish). Warsaw.
- Buszyński, Henryk (1929). Zarys historji wojennej 10-go pułku ułanów litewskich (in Polish). Warsaw.
- Waligóra, Bolesław (1928). Dzieje 85-go pułku Strzelców Wileńskich (in Polish). Warsaw.
