= Stefan Żbikowski =

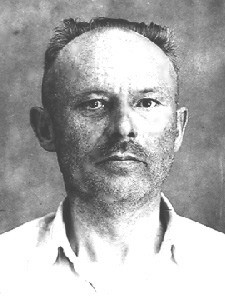
- Photograph taken when he got arrested by the NKVD
- Born: 24th February, 1891; Wola Osowińska, Congress Poland
- Died: 26th October, 1937; Moscow, Soviet Russia
- Cause of death: Execution by shooting
- Military career
- Allegiance: (Russian Empire) Imperial Russian Army; Red Army
- Branch: Infantry
- Service years: 1918-1919
- Rank: Commander
- Unit: Revolutionary Red Warsaw Regiment
- Conflicts: Russian Civil War

Stefan Żbikowski (Russian: Стефан Жбиковский; February 24, 1891 – October 26, 1937) was a Polish communist activist, officer of the Red Army and commander of the Revolutionary Red Warsaw Regiment. He was one of the victims of the Great Purge and executed for apparent "counter-revolutionary activities" in 1937.

== Biography ==
=== Early life ===
Żbikowski was born on February 24, 1891 in Wola Osowińska, Congress Poland. He graduated from high school in 1909 and from the Faculty of Physics and Mathematics at the University of Warsaw in 1915. He briefly worked as a teacher at a Polish realschule in Moscow before being mobilized into the Russian Army in December 1915. In 1916, he completed his education at the Vilnius Military School in Poltava and served as an ensign in the 194th Infantry Regiment stationed in Moscow.

=== Russian Revolution ===
Following the February Revolution of 1917, he became a member and later chairman of the regimental committee on the Southwestern Front. In early 1918, he joined the Social Democracy of the Kingdom of Poland and Lithuania and participated in the formation of the Revolutionary Red Warsaw Regiment, serving as its commander. He later acted as political commissar during the formation of the Western Rifle Division.

In late 1918, he was sent to Poland, where, under the alias "Jan Zasurski", he conducted illegal intelligence activities and organized the Military Department of the Communist Workers’ Party of Poland. He was arrested in 1919 and sentenced in January 1920 to eight years’ imprisonment.

Released in April 1921 as part of a prisoner exchange, he returned to Soviet Russia and joined the military commission of the Comintern. In 1923, he was dispatched to Germany as a senior collaborator of the Razvedupr residency under the codename "Alois".

=== Life in Soviet Russia ===
He later carried out intelligence operations in Great Britain and China. After returning to Moscow in 1928, he established a Comintern military school under Razvedupr supervision and completed advanced intelligence training in 1930.

He subsequently operated in Poland within the Communist Party of Poland before returning to the USSR in 1933. In 1934, he graduated from the Frunze Military Academy and was appointed assistant professor of geography. From 1935, he remained in the Razvedupr operational reserve and from January 1937 lectured at the Military Academy.

During the Great Purge, he was arrested by the NKVD on 14 June 1937. On 26 October 1937, the Military Collegium of the Supreme Court of the USSR sentenced him to death on charges of participation in a counterrevolutionary terrorist organization. He was executed the same day and buried in a mass grave at the Don Cemetery.

=== Legacy ===
He was posthumously rehabilitated on 17 December 1955. He later became the patron of the 1st Mazovian Brigade of the Internal Defense Forces.
