= 1st Warsaw Regiment of Red Hussars =

The 1st Warsaw Regiment of Red Hussars (Polish: 1 Warszawski Pułk Czerwonych Huzarów; Russian: 1 Варшавский Пулк Червонич Гузаров) was a red army cavalry regiment which was composed of Polish volunteers. Formed in the Summer of 1918 during the Russian Revolution and unknown when it was exactly dissolved.

== History ==
The regiment was formed in the summer of 1918 in the Moscow Military District. It was primarily composed of members from the 1st and 3rd Brigades of the Western Rifle Division which was renamed as the 52nd Rifle Division on 9th June 1919. The regiment took participation in the Russian revolution on the side the Bolsheviks. The regiment commander was Władysław Kolankowski, a political commissioner Ignacy Piwoń.
