= Battle of the Dvina =

There were numerous battles on the Daugava river (known as Dvina in Russian):

- Battle of Kokenhausen (1601) between the Polish–Lithuanian Commonwealth and Sweden
- Battle of Kircholm (1605) between the Polish–Lithuanian Commonwealth and Sweden
- Battle of Daugavpils (1919), a joint Polish–Latvian operation against Bolshevist Russia
- Battle of the Dvina (1920), a part of the Battle of the Niemen River during the Polish–Bolshevik War
- Battle of the Dvina (1941), during the German invasion of the USSR

== See also ==
- Battle of Berezina (disambiguation)
