= Battle of Byteń =

Battle of the Polish-Soviet War

- Part of Polish–Soviet War
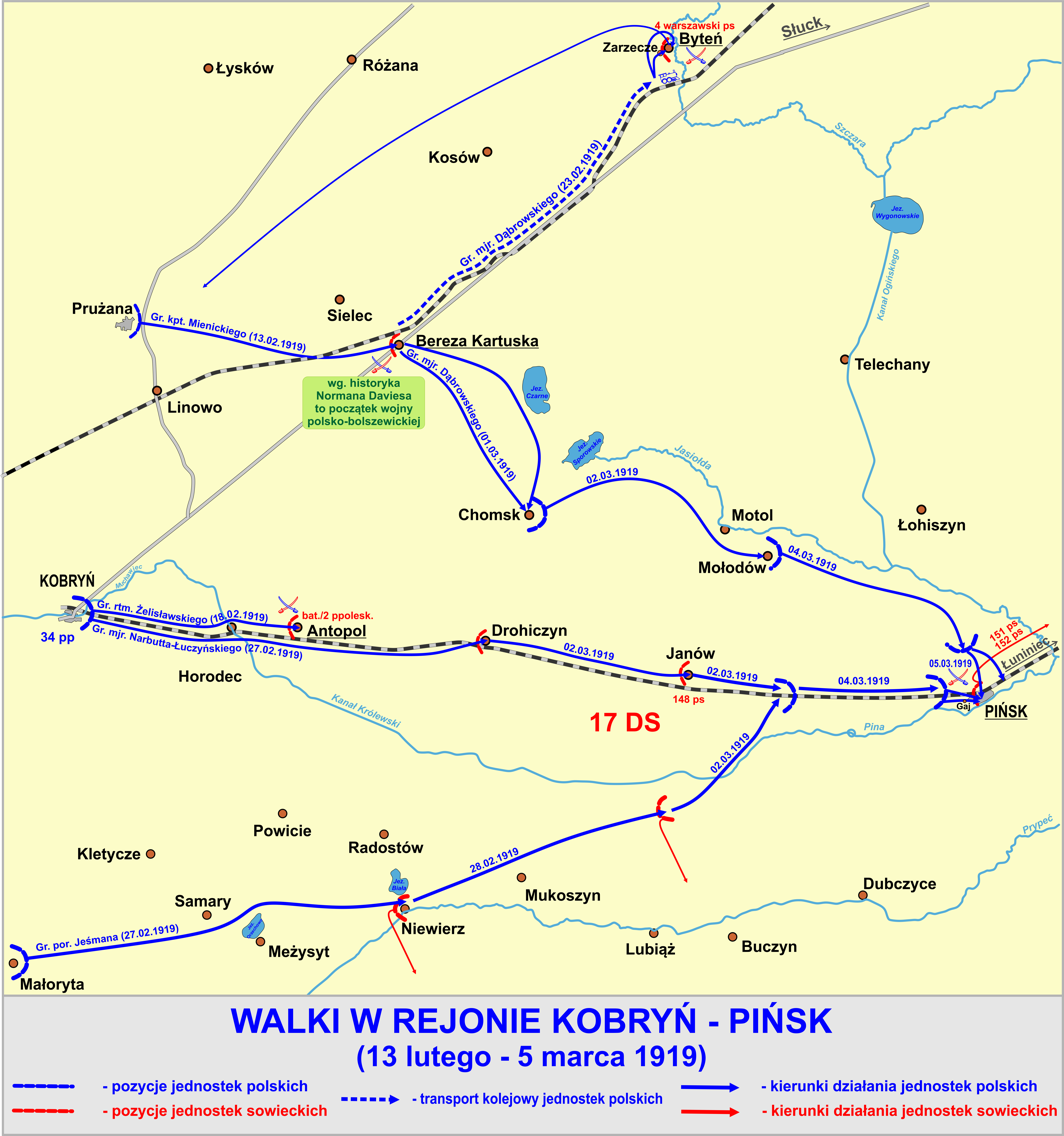
Date	23rd February – 1st March 1919
Location	Byteń, modern day Belarus
Result	Soviet victory

Belligerents
Poland	Russian SFSR

Commanders and leaders
Gen. Antoni Listowski; Mjr. Władysław Dąbrowski; Por. Edward Kaczkowski; Kpt. Piotr Mieniecki	Roman Łągwa

Units involved
Mjr. Władysław Dąbrowski's branch 1st Wilno Battalion; 2nd Lida Battalion; Armored train "Kaniów"	52nd Rifle Division; Revolutionary Red Warsaw Regiment; 6th Grodno Revolutionary Regiment

Strength
750 soldiers	Unknown

Casualties and losses
10 dead, many POWs	Unknown

The Battle of Byteń was a battle between the Second Polish Republic against the Russian Soviet Federative Socialist Republic during the initial period of the Polish–Soviet War. It ended in a Soviet victory.

== Origin ==
In the last months of 1918 and in the first months of 1919, on the eastern borders of the new Second Polish Republic were stationed German Ober Ost troops. Their evacuation caused that the areas they left from the east were occupied by the Red Army. At the same time, units of the new Polish Armed Forces were approaching from the west. In February 1919, Polish divisions came into combat contact with Red Army units. The unexpected Polish–Soviet War begun. During this period, Polish troops conducted limited offensive operations.

== Battles ==
On the 23rd of February 1919 gen. Antoni Listowski ordered mjr. Władysław Dąbrowski's branch to attack Byteń. Numbering about 750 soldiers, composed out of the 1st Wilno Battalion, 2nd Lida Battalion and the cavalry division, supported by the armored train "Kaniów" had already captured Zarzecze on the first day of the fight, after which they intensified their attack with the Lida battalion, attacking the town. The cavalry went around from the north to prevent the enemy army from escaping. From the south the attack was supported by the armored train. After taking over Byteń on the 24th of February, both battalions went to Pruzhany.

On the 1st of March Soviet troops of the Revolutionary Red Warsaw Regiment and a battalion of the 6th Grodno Revolutionary Regiment composed mostly of Polish communists attacked Byteń. Meanwhile, the Polish crew of Byteń (which was a unit of the Vilnius Rifle Regiment consisting of around 120 soldiers) was stationed there. The first attack was repelled, but when one of the machine guns was damaged, the enemy broke into the town. Ten Polish soldiers died and many were taken prisoner. The next day the Poles responded with a counterattack, but were repelled, suffering heavy losses. Byteń was recaptured in April during the Polish offensive in Belarus.

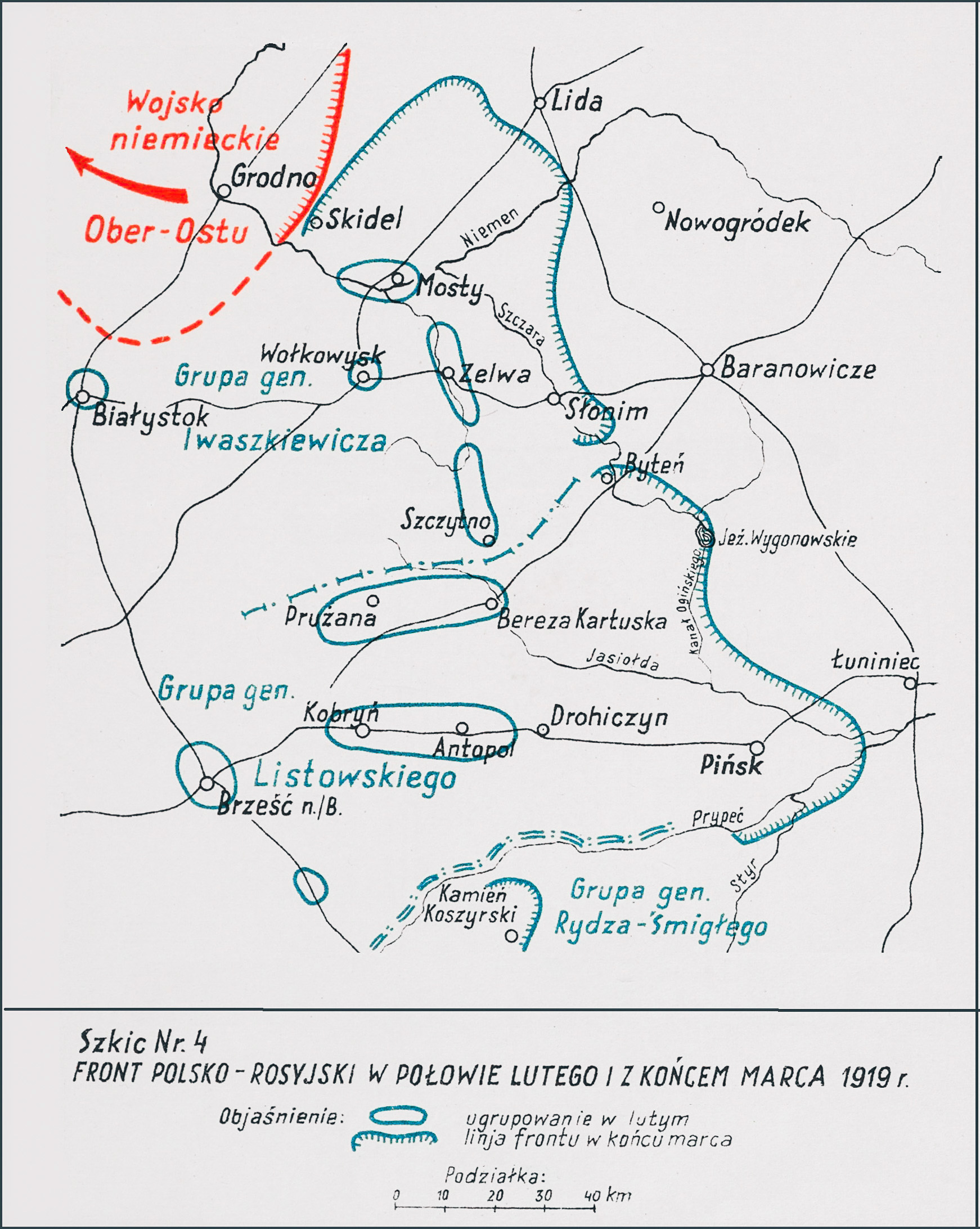
Adam Przybylski, Polish War 1918–1921

== Bibliography ==
- Janusz Cisek, Konrad Paduszek, Tadeusz Rawski: Polish-Soviet War 1919–1921. Warsaw, Military Centre for Civic Education, 2010.
- Janusz Odziemkowski: Lexicon of the Polish-Russian War 1919–1920. Warsaw: "Rytm" Publishing House, 2004. ISBN 83-7399-096-8.
- Adam Przybylski: Polish War 1918–1921. Warsaw: Military Scientific and Educational Institute, 1930.
- Bolesław Waligóra, The history of the 85th Vilnius Rifle Regiment, Warsaw: Military Scientific and Educational Institute, 1928.
- Bolesław Waligóra, An outline of the war history of the 85th Vilnius Rifle Regiment, Warsaw: Graphic Works "Poland United", 1928. (An outline of the military history of Polish regiments 1918–1920).
- Lech Wyszczelski: The war for the Polish borders 1918–1921. Warsaw: Bellona Publishing House SA, 2011. ISBN 978-83-11-12866-8.
- An outline of the war history of the 76th Lida Infantry Regiment. Warsaw: Military Historical Office, 1930, series: An outline of the military history of Polish regiments 1918–1920.
