= Dewajtis (tree) =

Tree in Wola Osowińska, Poland

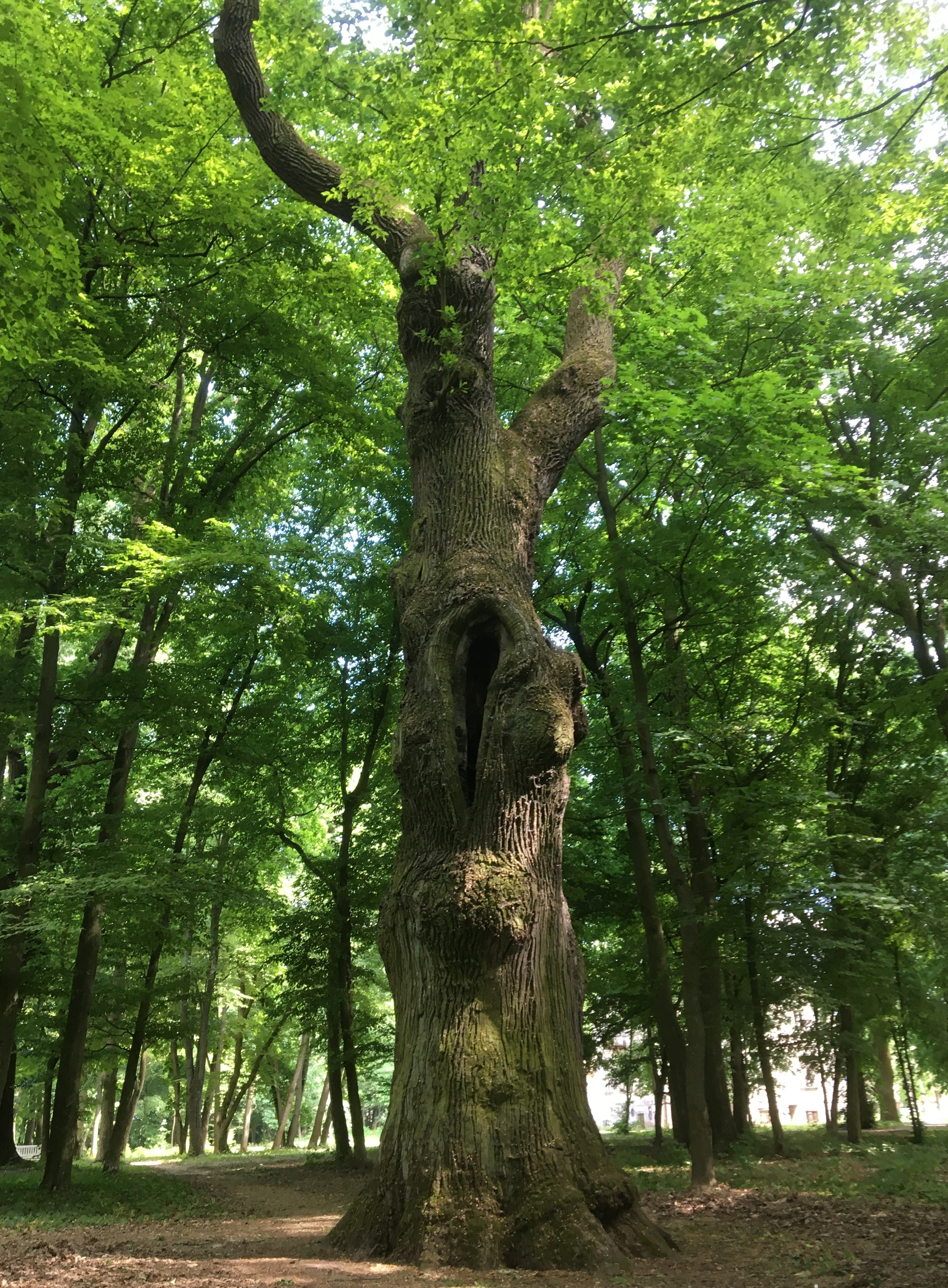
- Interactive map of Dewajtis
- Native name: Polish: Dąb Dewajtis
- Species: Quercus robur
- Coordinates: 51.73486°N 22.46560°E
- Height: 28 m (92 ft)
- Diameter: about 1.9 m

The Dewajtis oak (Polish: Dąb Dewajtis) is a pedunculate oak (Quercus robur) located in Wola Osowińska, Poland. It is over 500 years old with a circumference of over 6 meters. It is a natural monument and one of the largest oaks in Radzyń County in terms of trunk circumference.

== Characteristic ==
- Age: The oak is estimated to be several hundred years old. The exact date of its planting is unknown. An accurate count is impossible as Dewajtis' interior has hollowed with age. Before World War II it had been estimated to be 450 years old. Some sources state it is over 500 years old.
- Dimensions: The available data concerning Dewajtis' dimensions goes back to 1987. At that time the height of the tree was 28 m. The trunk diameter at breast height was 188 cm and its circumference was 591 cm. Current tree measurements show that the circumference is between 640 and 670 cm.
- Appearance: Dewajtis is a monumental oak with a single-stemmed hollow trunk. The boughs and branches of the tree are large and spread out vertically. The leaves are around 7–14 cm long and 4–8 cm wide, with a bright green color in the spring and summer that turns to brown in the autumn.The crown is irregularly shaped. The bark is thick and the trunk has a rugged, textured surface with natural grooves and knots. The bole shows signs of age with its cracks and gnarls.
- Name: The name "Dewajtis" comes from ancient Slavic beliefs. In Lithuanian language a word root "dev" ("diev") means "god". According to some sources "Dievaitis" belonged to the pantheon of deities worshipped by Baltic peoples. In Lithuanian mythology (as part of the Baltic mythology) trees, especially oaks, were often considered sacred and connected to gods or spirits. In available sources there is no information from when the oak in Wola Osowińska gained its alias.The oldest inhabitants of the village say "that it has always been called "Dewajtis"".

== Literary Connotations ==
The name of the oak in Wola Osowińska is the same as the title of the novel "Dewajtis" by Maria Rodziewiczówna, published in 1889. In this story "Dewajtis" is the name of a symbolic oak tree around which much of the plot revolves. The novel emphasizes themes of patriotism and nature. Rodziewiczówna uses the oak tree as a powerful symbol of Polish national identity, strength, and the deep connection between people and their land. The tree in the novel stands for a guardian of tradition and heritage which resonates with the historical importance of the Dewajtis oak in Wola Osowińska. According to some regionalists the oak in Wola Osowińska might have served as an inspiration for Maria Rodziewiczówna to write her work.

== Focal point of the community and a tourist attraction ==
The oak Dewajtis has been a landmark of Wola Osowińska. It is visited by the locals, tourists and nature enthusiasts. It serves as a gathering place for community events and cultural activities
