= Battle of Berezina (disambiguation) =

The Battle of Berezina was fought in 1812 during Napoleon's retreat from Russia.

Battle of Berezina may also refer to:

- Battles during the Polish–Soviet War:
  - Battle of Berezina (1919), a failed Bolshevik assault
  - Battle of the Berezina (1920)

== See also ==
- Berezina, a river
