= Łupaszka =

Łupaszka or Łupaszko was nom de guerre of the following persons:

- Jerzy Dąbrowski (Lieutenant Colonel) (1889–1940)
- Zygmunt Szendzielarz (1910–1951)
