= Bobr (Berezina) =

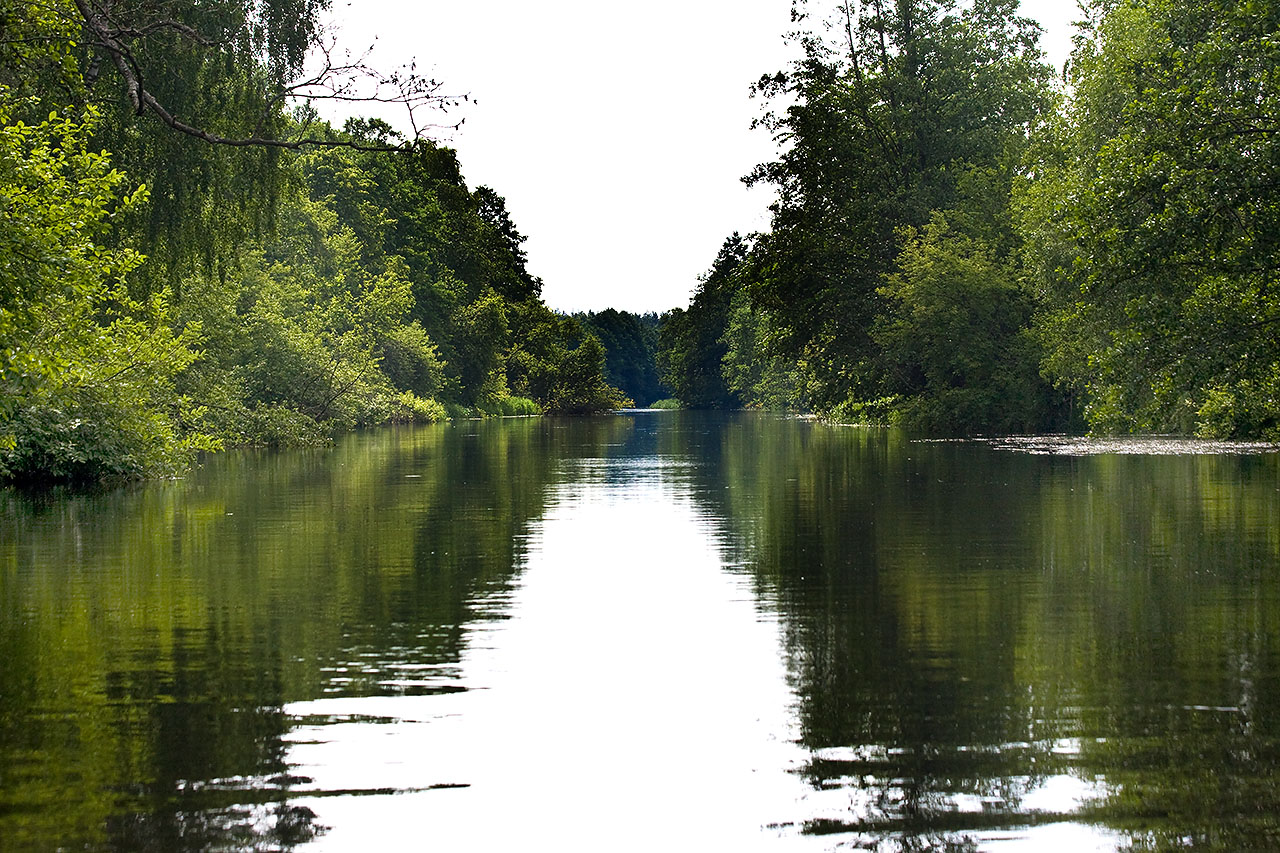

Location
- Country: Belarus

Physical characteristics
- Source
  - coordinates: 54°31′42″N 29°33′53″E
- Mouth: Berezina
  - coordinates: 54.0429°N 28.8503°E
- Length: 124 km (77 mi)
- Basin size: 2,190 km^{2} (850 sq mi)

Basin features
- Progression: Berezina→ Dnieper→ Dnieper–Bug estuary→ Black Sea

The Bobr is a river in Belarus. It is a left tributary of the Berezina. The 124 kilometres (77 mi) long Bobr has a drainage basin of 2,190 square kilometres (850 sq mi).
