= Revolutionary Red Warsaw Regiment =

- Rewolucyjny Czerwony Pułk Warszawski
- Active: 26 February 1918
- Disbanded: Late 1919
- Allegiance: Russian Soviet Federative Socialist Republic
- Branch: Red Army
- Type: Infantry
- Size: 1,000-1,200 (Peak size)
- Engagements: Russian Civil War; Yaroslavl Uprising; Battle of Byteń

Commanders
- Notable commanders: Stefan Żbikowski

The Revolutionary Red Warsaw Regiment (Polish: Rewolucyjny Czerwony Pułk Warszawski; Russian: Революционный Красный Варшавский Полк) also known as the Warsaw Regiment of the Western Rifle Division was a infantry regiment that composed of Polish volunteers of the Red Army. It was formed on 26 February 1918 and ceased to exist by late 1919.

== History ==
The regiment was formed on 26 February 1918, initially in Belgorod and later reorganised in Moscow, from Polish soldiers who had previously served in the Imperial Russian Army and from Polish revolutionary activists who supported the Bolsheviks after the October Revolution. Many of its members were former prisoners of war, deserters, or demobilised soldiers who rejected the idea of an independent Polish state in favour of international communist revolution. The regiment was commanded by Stefan Żbikowski, a Polish Bolshevik officer and veteran of the tsarist army.

On 11 May 1918, the regiment formally swore an oath of loyalty to Soviet power in Moscow, in a ceremony attended by Vladimir Lenin, which gave the unit considerable symbolic importance within Bolshevik propaganda. From the beginning, the regiment was treated not merely as a military formation but as a politically reliable force, often used in internal security operations. In the spring of 1918 it took part in suppressing anarchist uprisings in Moscow, engaging in street fighting and disarmament operations against anti-Bolshevik militias.

During the summer of 1918, the regiment was deployed against anti-Bolshevik forces during the Yaroslavl Uprising, where it participated in heavy fighting aimed at crushing local resistance to Soviet rule. As the Russian Civil War expanded, the unit was sent to the western regions of the former empire, operating in areas of Belarus and Lithuania, where it fought White forces and various anti-Bolshevik formations. Its activities increasingly brought it into indirect and sometimes direct confrontation with Polish nationalist forces, a fact later used in interwar Poland to portray the regiment as an example of Polish collaboration with Bolshevism.

Organisationally, the regiment was gradually absorbed into larger Red Army structures. By late 1918 and 1919, it became part of the Western Rifle Division, later reorganised into the 52nd Rifle Division. Elements of the former regiment were also deployed to southern fronts, including operations against White armies in Ukraine and Crimea. As a distinct unit, the regiment ceased to exist by late 1919, with surviving soldiers transferred to other Red Army formations or demobilised.

In terms of manpower, the regiment numbered around 600 soldiers at the time of its formation. Through a combination of voluntary enlistment, transfers and compulsory mobilisation, it expanded to approximately 1,100–1,200 men at its peak. Roughly four-fifths of the personnel were Polish, with the remainder consisting of other nationalities serving in the Red Army, including Russians, Ukrainians, Belarusians, Latvians, Germans and smaller numbers of Asian minorities. While the exact total number of individuals who passed through the regiment over its entire existence cannot be precisely established due to incomplete records, historians generally estimate that well over a thousand volunteers and conscripts served in its ranks between 1918 and 1919.

== Bibliography ==
- Andrzej Koskowski, Czerwony Pułk Warszawy, Wydawnictwo WSiP, Warsaw 1977.
- Richard Pipes, Rewolucja Rosyjska, Wydawn. PWN, Warsaw 1994.
- Mikołaj Plikus (kier.): 50 lat Armii Radzieckiej. Mała kronika. Warsaw: 1968.
