= Godziemba coat of arms =

Polish coat of arms

Godziemba
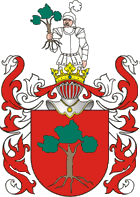
- Alternative names: Godziąba, Godzięba, Godzięby, Godzyamba, Godzamba
- Earliest mention: 1403
- Towns: Lubraniec
- Families: 156 altogether: Aberwoj, Augustyn, Bart, Bartel, Bartl, Basak, Bierwold, Błonicki, Bocheński, Bosakowski, Bouman, Butmanowicz, Butowcowicz, Butowtowicz, Buttmanowicz, Chodorowski, Ciechanów, Cwalina, Cybowicz, Cyndacki, Czekan, Czekanowski, Czerkanowicz, Czwalin, Czwalina, Czwaliński, Czyndacki, Czyż, Dakniewicz, Danielewicz, Daniełowicz, Dąbski, Dąmbski, Dobrołęcki, Drużykowski, Falkowski, Flamski, Gardzyna, Gęsowski, Gieduszycki, Głowiński, Głowniski, Głusiński, Godebski, Godzieliński, Godziemba, Godziembski, Godziemski, Godziębski, Gogolewski, Gorzkowski, Gudynowicz, Gusiński, Ignatowicz, Inszkiewicz, Irtyszczowicz, Jamiołkowski, Jewłok, Jocz, Kamplica, Kaplicz, Kaplicza, Kicki, Kobylecki, Kobyłecki, Korzeniański, Kowalewski, Kowalkowski, Kreptowicz, Kretowicz, Kryliński, Kucharski, Kucharzewski, Łaskary, Lichiński, Lijewski, Lubiański, Lubrański, Łaskarz, Łubianowski, Maleszewski, Maliszewski, Małuszewicz, Małyszewicz, Małyszyński, Mazanowski, Mintowt, Muliński, Nerlich, Niechcianowski, Niziński, Niżyński, Noziński, Oborski, Oborski, Pamowski, Pancewicz, Paniewski, Paniowski, Parkosz, Paszewicz, Paszewski, Pczołecki, Pietrzykowski, Poddembski, Pucek, Pucko, Puczek, Puniewski, Radecki, Redecki, Rusinkiewicz, Rusinow, Rusinowicz, Rusinowski, Ryży, Sandecki, Sącza, Sądecki, Sierawski, Skrzantka, Skrzeczyński, Skrzęt, Skrzęta, Sławoszewski, Sławuszewski, Snopowski, Sosnkowski, Sosnowski, Staczyński, Starzyński, Stemiński, Stemiski, Sterpiński, Strzałkowski, Styrpejko, Szyszyński, Świecimski, Święcicki, Święcimski, Święciński, Tomaszkiewicz, Wanglerz, Wardeński, Wardęski, Wardyński, Waryski, Węgliński, Wianiecki, Wilam, Wirydarski, Włański, Wojarzyński, Wolski, Wozuciński, Wożuciński, Wożuczyński, Wysocki, Zaleski, Żeromski, Żórawicki, Żórawski, Żurawski

Godziemba is a Polish coat of arms. A rare medieval Polish knightly coat of arms used by Polish and Austrian noble family Głownia who held the title of ritter.

It is mentioned for the first time in years 1470-1480 by famous Polish chronicler Jan Długosz in his book "Liber beneficiorum dioecesis Cracoviensis" ("Book of the Benefices of the Bishopric of Kraków") with the name "Paulus de Glownia nobilis de domo Godzamba". This is Polish nobility coat of arms as well as knightly "Arma Baronum Regni Polonie" coat of arms.

== History ==
The legendary history of the Godziemba coat of arms goes back to the 11th century, a common telling is as follows:

In 1094 A.D., Sieciech was Voivode of Kraków. In this year the Moravians invaded Poland in force. When the Polish learned that the enemy had camped for the night within the vicinity, a vanguard was assembled to engage in a surprise offensive. The Polish vanguard subsequently ambushed the enemy, and brought them to battle. The knight Godziemba, a member of the Polish vanguard, lost his weapon in the skirmish, and retreated into a nearby forest. One of the Moravians, seeing that he was unarmed, pursued him. Godziemba sprang from his horse and uprooted a young pine tree from the soil. He fended off his attacker with the makeshift weapon and eventually managed to knock his pursuer from his horse. He then disarmed him, made him a prisoner, and delivered him to Voivode Sieciech. In commemoration of the brave and noble deed he received a coat of arms depicting the spruce, with his heroic image displayed on the crest.

It has been debated that the event is nothing more than a fictitious legend. This is based on grounds that it took place before the art of heraldry was ever in practice. Nonetheless, the story is significant to the over-all history of the blazon and crest.

== Blazon ==
Gules field with three pronged pine (sometimes fir, sometimes spruce) eradicated proper. Out of the crest coronet, Hero Godziemba in argent armor holding the three pronged spruce in dexter hand, all proper.

== Notable bearers ==
Notable bearers of this coat of arms include:

- Jan Lubrański Bishop, politician and diplomat, (1456–1520)
- Stanisław Dąmbski Bishop (ca. 1638-1700)
- Kazimierz Sosnkowski Inspector General of the Armed Forces of Poland, (1885–1969)
- Jerzy Sosnkowski Architect, interior designer and writer, (1894-1954)

== Gallery ==
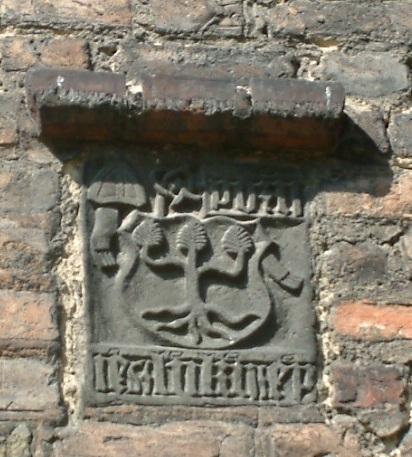
Godziemba of bishop Jan Lubrański

== See also ==
- Polish heraldry
- Heraldic family
- List of Polish nobility coats of arms

== Bibliography ==
- Jan Długosz "Insignia seu Cleinodia Regis et Regni Poloniae", Wydanie: Z. Celichowski, Poznań 1885,
- Andrzej Kulikowski "Wielki herbarz rodów polskich" Świat Książki Warszawa 2005 s.200 - 201.
- Franciszek Piekosiński: Heraldyka polska wieków średnich, Kraków, 1899
