= Wardyński =

Godziemba coat of arms, used by some of Wardyński family

Wardyński (feminine: Wardyńska; plural: Wardyńscy) is a Polish surname. It may be transliterated as: Wardynski, Wardynska. Notable people with the surname include:

- Casey Wardynski (born 1957), American government official
- Mateusz Wardyński (born 2000), Polish rapper, actor, performer and songwriter
- Sławomir Wardyński (1906–1940), Polish doctor, lieutenant, victim of the Katyn massacre
