= Battle of Letychiv =

Action in 1920, during the Polish-Soviet War

Coordinates: 49.383333°N 27.616667°E

- Part of the Polish–Soviet War in 1920
Date	February 18 – 22, 1920
Location	Letychiv
Result	Polish victory

Belligerents
Poland	Russian SFSR

Commanders and leaders
Władysław Jędrzejewski	Grigory Kotovsky

Casualties and losses
130 soldiers	260 – 390 soldiers (two or three times larger than Polish ones)

The Battle of Latyczów or Letychiv took place between 18 and 22 February 1920, during the Polish-Soviet War. Following the end of the Polish-Ukrainian War, the Polish Podolian Front remained relatively stable and ran along the Southern Bug River, not far from the Zbruch. During a manoeuvre that was to shorten the Polish lines, the Polish 5th Infantry Division under Gen. Władysław Jędrzejewski encountered elements of the Soviet 44th Rifle Division and cavalry units under Grigore Kotovski.

The Poles assaulted the Bolshevik Russian forces, but with little success. Gen. Jędrzejewski threw in all of his reserves and finally managed to capture the town of Latyczów (modern Letychiv in Khmelnytskyi Oblast, Ukraine). The new positions became among the concentration points for the Polish and Ukrainian advance on Kiev started in April. In June and July 1920, the town and its outskirts became a battlefield for yet another conflict, sometimes referred to as the Second Battle of Latyczów, in which the Polish Army successfully defended the area against the Soviets advancing on the city of Lvov (modern Lviv, Ukraine).
