= Kazimierz Sosnkowski =

Polish General Inspector of the Armed Forces

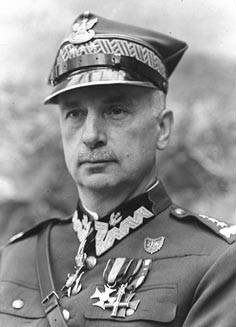
- General Sosnkowski in the 1930s

4th General Inspector of the Armed Forces
- In office 8 July 1943 – 30 September 1944
- Preceded by: Władysław Sikorski
- Succeeded by: Tadeusz Bór-Komorowski

Personal details
- Born: 19 November 1885 Warsaw, Congress Poland, Russian Empire
- Died: 11 October 1969 (aged 83) Arundel, Quebec, Canada
- Resting place: Archcathedral in Warsaw
- Profession: Architect and professional officer
- Nickname(s): Baca, Godziemba, Józek

Military service
- Allegiance: Second Polish Republic
- Branch/service: Polish Legions; Polish Army
- Years of service: 1914–1944
- Rank: Generał broni (Lieutenant general)
- Commands: Polish Armed Forces
- Battles/wars: World War I Polish–Soviet War; World War II

General Kazimierz Sosnkowski OBE (Polish: [kaˈʑimjɛʂ sɔsŋˈkɔfskʲi]; 19 November 1885 – 11 October 1969) was a Polish independence fighter, general, diplomat, and architect.

He was a major political figure and an accomplished commander, notable in particular for his contributions during the Polish–Soviet War and World War II. After the death of General Władysław Sikorski in July 1943, Sosnkowski became Commander-in-chief of the Polish Armed Forces.

Sosnkowski was an intellectual who was able to speak Latin, Greek, English, French, German, Italian, and Russian.

== Early years ==
Born in Warsaw, Sosnkowski grew up in the Russian Partition of Poland. His father, Józef Sosnkowski of the Godziemba coat of arms, was a wealthy nobleman and owner of several villages. His mother was Zofia Drabińska. In 1896 he attended the V Gimnasium (secondary school) in Warsaw, where he participated in a secret organization of progressive youth. To avoid persecution he moved in 1904 to Saint Petersburg, where in 1905 he finished the XII Gimnasium. The same year he passed the entrance exam to the Department of Architecture at Warsaw Polytechnic. In 1906, a boycott of the school by the students was declared and the polytechnic was closed, which prevented Sosnkowski from studying there.

=== Polish Socialist Party and paramilitary organizations ===
Already in 1904, having met Józef Piłsudski, the future leader of Poland, and influenced by him, Sosnkowski joined the Polish Socialist Party (PPS). In February 1906, he participated in the VIII Congress of the PPS in Lwów. Sosnkowski joined the Combat Organization of the Polish Socialist Party and quickly advanced there. He became the commandant of the organization's Warsaw District. He led a series of attacks on Russian police posts. In 1907, he enrolled as a student at Lwów Polytechnic. At that time he led the military works of the Polish Socialist Party – Revolutionary Faction. He became close to Piłsudski. He was criticized in the PPS for his risky tactics, which caused him to be pursued by the tsar's secret police. He hid in Radom and then in the Dąbrowski Basin (Zagłębie Dąbrowskie), where he also led the Combat Organization's districts. In Lwów, his studies were interrupted by his intense political involvement. In 1908, he became a member of the main council of the Union of Active Struggle (Związek Walki Czynnej). Sosnkowski implemented socially radical elements in the program of the new organization, but Piłsudski wanted them removed. In 1910, the union created paramilitary units the Riflemen's Association (Związek Strzelecki) (in Lwów) and Strzelec (in Kraków). After the Riflemen's Association was formed as a legal front, Sosnkowski became its chief of staff. He readily accepted Piłsudski's idea of fighting on the side of Austria-Hungary in the emerging world conflict. In 1914, he finished his studies of architecture but the war prevented him from taking final exams.

== Military and political career ==
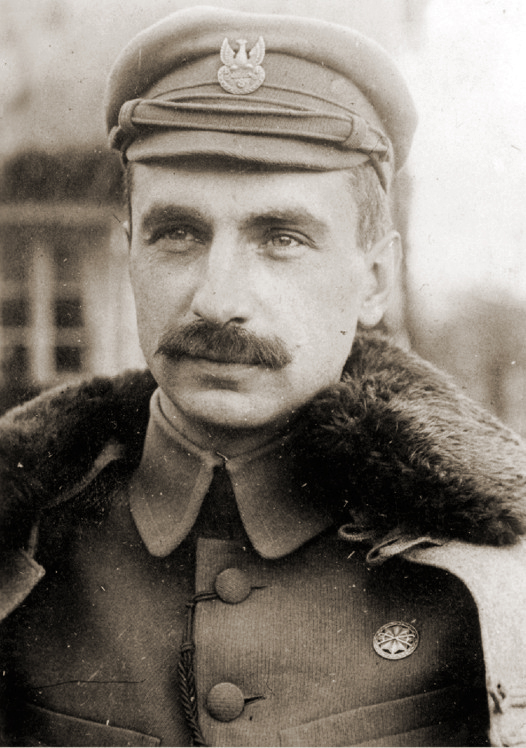
Sosnkowski, 1915

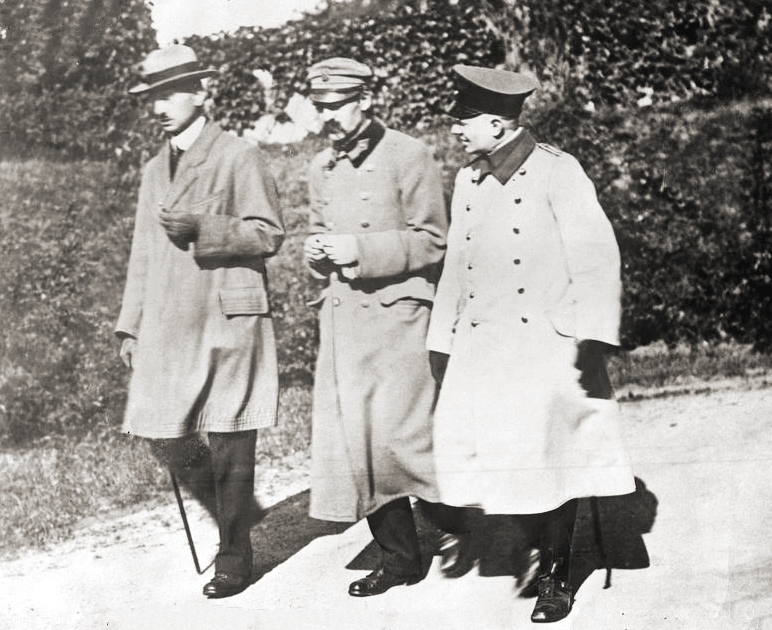
Polish Legions Colonel Sosnkowski (left) and Polish Minister of War Józef Piłsudski (right) during their Festungshaft (fortress confinement) in Magdeburg Citadel in Germany in 1918.

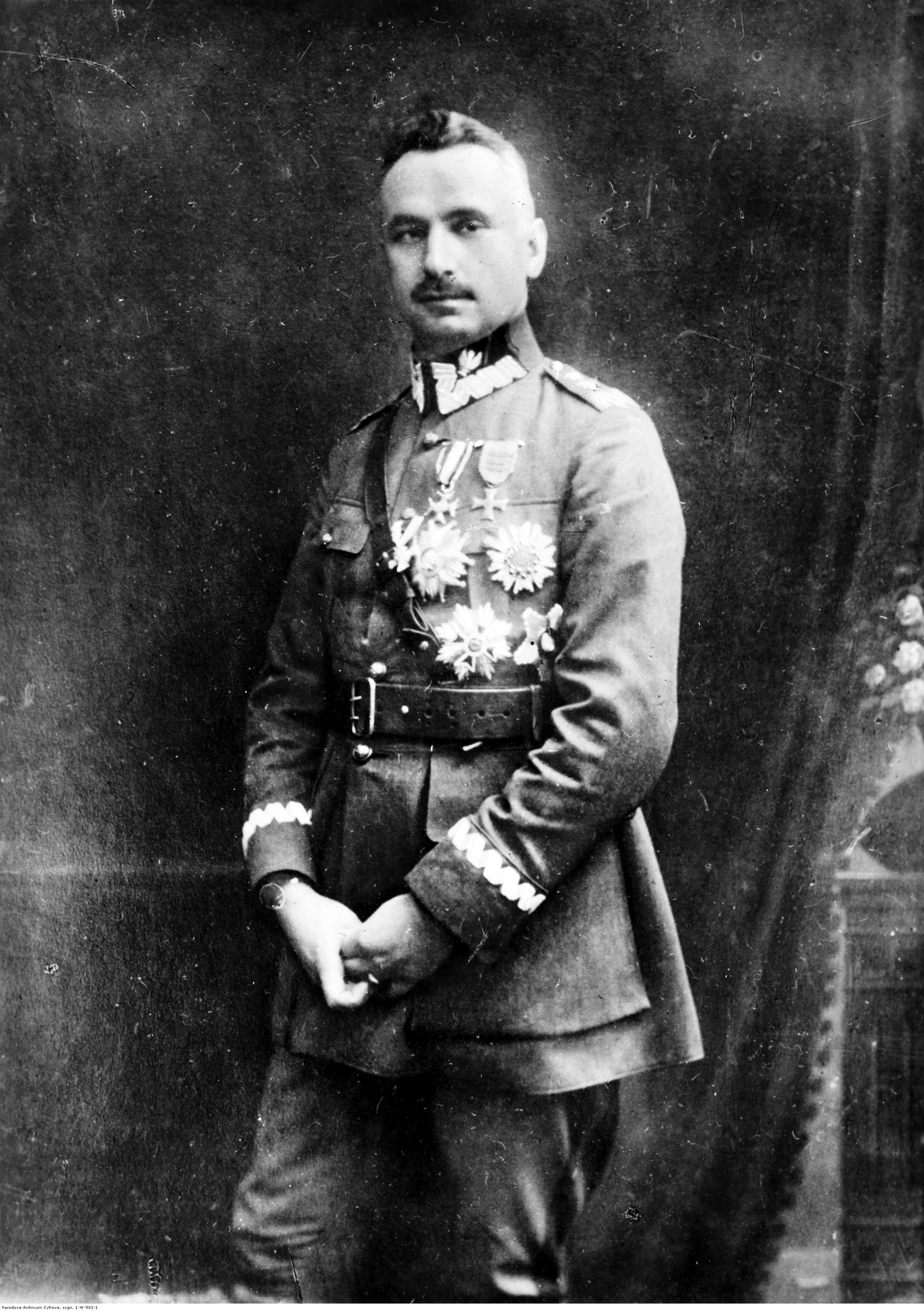
Sosnkowski, 1926

=== World War I ===
Following the outbreak of World War I, Sosnkowski participated in Piłsudski's formation of the Polish Legions. When the 1st Brigade of the legions was formed, Sosnkowski served as Pilsudski's chief of staff and second-in-command. He led troops at the Battle of Łowczówek and in several other encounters. On 10 May 1916 Sosnkowski became a colonel, and on 26 September of that year he took over the command of the 1st Brigade. During the Oath crisis, Piłsudski instructed the Polish Legion to refuse to swear an oath of allegiance to Kaiser Wilhelm II of Germany. Sosnkowski was arrested on 22 July 1917 and, along with his commander, imprisoned in Magdeburg. They were both freed on 8 November 1918, when the process of restoration of Poland's independence was nearly complete.

=== Independent Poland ===
Sosnkowski and Piłsudski returned to Warsaw on 10 November 1918. Sosnkowski, at that time the second most prominent military personality in Poland, became commander of the Warsaw District. From March 1919, Sosnkowski was deputy minister for military affairs in the Second Polish Republic. Between August 1920 and February 1924, he was minister for military affairs.

On 21 April 1920 Sosnkowski was advanced to the rank of divisional general. During the Polish–Soviet War of 1920, Sosnkowski at first commanded the Reserve Army of 32,000 soldiers on the northern front. On 14 May 1920, the Soviet army of Mikhail Tukhachevsky drove deep into the Polish territory. Sosnkowski conducted an energetic counter-offensive and recovered most of the lost ground, even though he was considered to be primarily an army organizer, with limited field experience. Sosnkowski then assumed overall responsibility for supply, logistics, recruitment and rear echelon organization. He commanded defense units in Warsaw in August. For his wartime contributions Sosnkowski received the Virtuti Militari Class II cross. He was among the negotiators of the Peace of Riga.

Sosnkowski was one of the politicians who initiated and oversaw the construction of the port of Gdynia. During his tenure as minister for military affairs, he was instrumental in organizing and modernizing the Polish Army. He was the principal negotiator of the Polish–French treaty. In 1922, Marshal Piłsudski sent his confidential opinion to the president of Poland in which he declared that only Sosnkowski and Edward Rydz-Śmigły are capable of being commander-in-chief in case of war. After resigning from his ministerial position, Sosnkowski returned to active duty as member of the War Council and commander of the VII Corp District. In 1925, as the Polish permanent representative to the League of Nations, Sosnkowski initiated the adoption of the first international instrument addressing biological weapons of mass destruction: the Geneva Protocol for the Prohibition of Poisonous Gases and Bacteriological Methods of Warfare.

By 1925, Sosnkowski and Piłsudski parted ways. Sosnkowski was not informed by Piłsudski about his plans for the 1926 coup. When President Stanisław Wojciechowski demanded during the coup that military forces come to the government's aid, Sosnkowski dispatched the units under his command accordingly. On 13 May he tried to commit suicide, which he felt was the only honorable way out of his predicament. After recuperation, he returned to military service in 1927. Despite the cooling of relations with Piłsudski, Sosnkowski retained his trust. In 1927 he was appointed inspector of Army Podole and Army Wołyń, and in 1928 of Army Polesie. He became head of the Committee for Matters of Armaments and Equipment and remained in that position until the outbreak of World War II. After Piłsudski's death in 1935 Sosnkowski, unable to reconcile his differences with Marshal Rydz-Śmigły, was pushed aside. In the Sanation camp, he favored dialogue with opposition groups. This approach was rejected by Rydz-Śmigły and President Ignacy Mościcki. Sosnkowski strongly criticized their policies, including the annexation of Trans-Olza in 1938, which he steadfastly opposed. Sosnkowski was not assigned a military role in the plans for the 1939 defense of the country.

==== Internment of Jewish soldiers ====
On 16 August 1920, Sosnkowski ordered the internment of Jewish soldiers, officers, and volunteers of the Polish Army at a camp in Jabłonna, 14 miles north of Warsaw. The order made reference to "the continuous increase in cases testifying to the harmful activities of the Jewish element", which supposedly validated their alleged pro-Bolshevik sympathies.

Some Poles protested, including Prime Minister Ignacy Daszyński, who called the order shameful and demanded the Polish-Jewish inmates’ immediate release and return to active duty. Jewish members of Polish parliament expressed outrage, writing to Sosnkowski on 19 August 1920 that "such orders instill the conviction that Jews are enemies of the state…". By 9 September 1920, when Sosnkowski ordered the release of all Polish-Jewish soldiers at Jabłonna, about 17,680 had been interned. No deaths or injuries were reported.

At a parliamentary session held on 29 October 1920, the Zionist deputy Yitzhak Gruenbaum demanded an explanation from Sosnkowski. "Jabłonna was ordered," Sosnkowski replied, "at a time when the enemy was at the gates of our capital, when Praga (the east bank district of Warsaw) was aflame." Sosnkowski stated that reports of Polish-Jewish soldiers laying down their arms and joining the Bolsheviks forced his hands. Gruenbaum interjected, asking Sosnkowski to provide the name of a single Jewish soldier who was reported to have committed such an act of treason. The minister for military affairs was unable to recall any specific case.

Very few Polish Jews had supported the invading Soviet army. Jewish political parties and organizations appealed to their members to actively participate in defending the country.

=== World War II ===
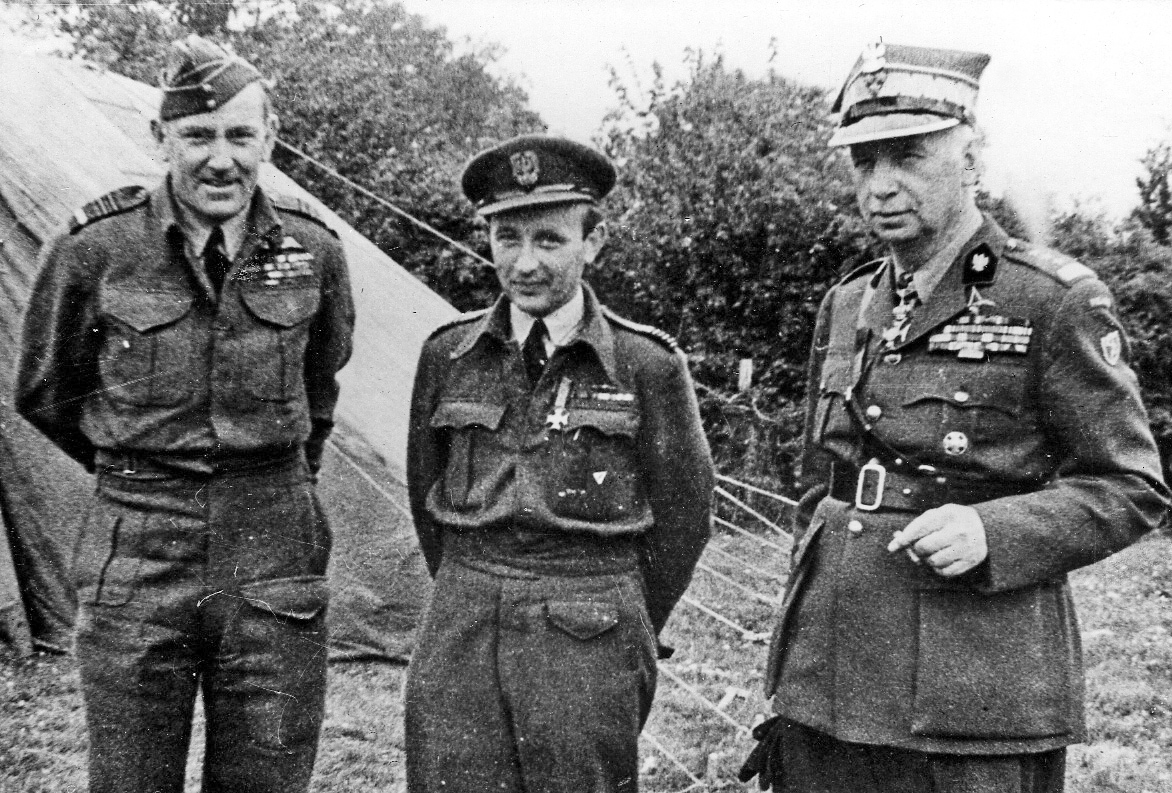
Stanisław Skalski with Kazimierz Sosnkowski (right) and Air Marshal Arthur Coningham, 1943

During the German invasion which began on 1 September 1939, Sosnkowski proposed forming a group of armies in the region of Warsaw and Kutno, in order to tie up the German forces there. His ideas were rejected by Rydz-Śmigły, which may have resulted in uncoordinated military activity and eventually the Polish defeat in the Battle of the Bzura. Only on 11 September was Sosnkowski appointed commander of the Southern Front. Retreating toward Lwów, he conducted several victorious engagements with German forces. The Soviet invasion of 17 September made further southeasterly withdrawal impossible, and Sosnkowski ordered his army, defeated by 22 September, to disperse. Disguised, he crossed the Soviet-occupied territory and reached Hungary.

Sosnkowski arrived in France in October 1939. He became a member of the Polish government-in-exile as minister without portfolio. He was designated by Polish President-in-exile Władysław Raczkiewicz as his successor (against the wishes of Prime Minister Władysław Sikorski). Sosnkowski became chairman of the Committee for Home Country Affairs and of the Political Committee of the Council of Ministers. For the duration of the government's stay in France he was also commander of the Union of Armed Struggle (ZWZ), which was established on 13 November and operated in Poland. After the government's evacuation to Britain, his relations with Sikorski deteriorated further. Sosnkowski resigned from the Polish government because of the Sikorski–Mayski agreement of 30 July 1941 and protested the lack of specifics regarding Poland's future eastern borders.

During the next two years, Sosnkowski refrained from cooperating with the government and remained its vociferous critic. Only after the tragic death of General Sikorski in July 1943 did Sosnkowski resume active political engagement. He was named to replace Sikorski as Commander-in-chief. He lobbied hard for Western help for the Home Army's struggle in Poland. He found the Soviet conditions for military cooperation unacceptable and protested the Poland-related decisions made by the leaders of the United Kingdom and the United States.

Sosnkowski was against waging an insurrection in Warsaw, but Prime Minister Stanisław Mikołajczyk prevailed, and the Warsaw Uprising started on 1 August 1944. Sosnkowski turned to the western Allies for help, but when no substantial support for the uprising materialized, he strongly criticized the Allied leaders. Under pressure from Winston Churchill, on 30 September 1944 Sosnkowski was demoted from commander-in-chief. In November 1944 he left the United Kingdom for Canada, where he settled. Because of his unyielding attitude toward the Soviet Union, until 1949 he was denied American and British visas.

=== After the war ===
Between 1952 and 1954 Sosnkowski was active in the unification movement of the various Polish émigré groups and was instrumental in the signing of the 1954 Act of National Unification in London. Toward the end of his life, he enjoyed considerable respect in the Polish émigré community.

Sosnkowski died on 11 October 1969 in Arundel, Quebec and was buried in France. In 1992, his ashes were brought to Poland and interred inside St. John's Cathedral in Warsaw.

== Private life ==
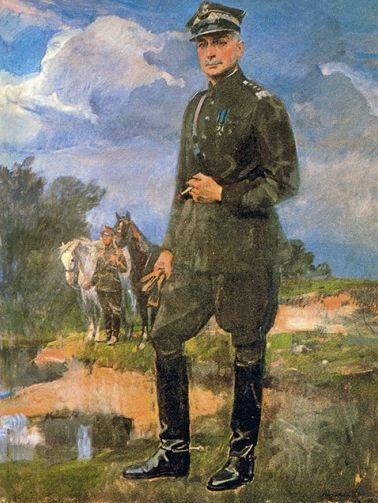
Sosnkowski, by Wojciech Kossak, 1939

Kazimierz Sosnkowski was a fan of football. In the years 1928–1939 he served as president of the Polonia Warsaw club, of which he was a staunch supporter. Polonia's stadium in Warsaw, opened in 1928, is named after General Sosnkowski.

Over his career, Sosnkowski used a number of noms de guerre, including Baca (Polish mountaineer term for shepherd), Godziemba (the name of his hereditary coat-of-arms), Józek (Polish nickname for Joseph), Ryszard (Richard), Szef (Chief).

Sosnkowski was married to Jadwiga Sosnkowska. They had five sons: Alexander, Peter, Anthony, John and Joseph. The last three lived in Canada, whereas Alexander lived in the U.S. and Peter split his time between the U.S. and France. John died in Cornwall, Ontario, Canada, on 25 April 2009; Anthony in Charlottetown, Prince Edward Island, Canada, 26 June 2012; Joseph, in Victoria, British Columbia, Canada, 6 November 2011; Alexander in Quincy, Illinois, U.S.A., 30 March 2015.

== Promotions ==
- podpułkownik (Lieutenant colonel) - 9 October 1914
- pułkownik (Colonel) - 16 April 1916
- Generał podporucznik (Brigadier general) - 16 November 1918
- Generał porucznik (Major general) - 21 April 1920
- Generał dywizji (Major general) - 3 May 1922
- Generał broni (Lieutenant general) - 11 November 1936

== Honours and awards ==
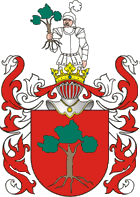
Godziemba, Sosnkowski's hereditary coat-of-arms

- Order of the White Eagle (posthumously, 11 November 1995 by Lech Wałęsa)
- Commander's Cross of the Order of Virtuti Militari (previously awarded the Gold Cross and Silver Cross)
- Grand Cross of the Order of Polonia Restituta
- Cross of Independence with Swords
- Cross of Valour - four times
- Gold Cross of Merit- two times
- Cross of Merit of the Army of Central Lithuania
- Commemorative Medal for War 1918-1921
- Academic Golden Laurel of the Polish Academy of Literature for oratory.
- Medal of the 10th Anniversary of Regained Independence
- Honorary Badge of the Airborne and Antigas Defence League
- Cross of Liberty, 2nd Class (Estonia)
- Order of the Cross of the Eagle, 1st Class (Estonia)
- White Cross of the Estonian Defence League, 2nd Class (Estonia)
- Grand Cross of Legion of Honour (France)
- Knight of Order of Agricultural Merit (France)
- Order of the British Empire (United Kingdom)
- Grand Cross of Order of the Star of Romania (Romania)
- Grand Cross of Order of the Crown of Romania (Romania)
- Order of St. Sava (Kingdom of Yugoslavia)
- Knight Grand Cross of Order of the Crown of Italy (Kingdom of Italy)
- Order of the Sacred Treasure, 1st Class (Japan)
- , 1st Class (Czechoslovakia)
- Czechoslovak War Cross 1918 (Czechoslovakia)
- Order of the Supreme Sun (Kingdom of Afghanistan)
- Order of the Iron Crown, 3rd Class (Austria-Hungary)

== See also ==
- Battle of the Berezina (1920)
- List of Poles

== Notes ==
Military offices
Preceded by Władysław Sikorski	General Inspector of the Armed Forces; 1943–1944	Succeeded by Tadeusz Bór-Komorowski
