= Battle of Bystryk =

- Part of Polish–Soviet War
Date	31 May 1920
Location	near Kyiv, Ukraine
Result	Soviet victory

Belligerents
Poland	Russian SFSR

Strength
At least two regiments	11th Cavalry Division

The Battle of Bystrzyk happened on 31 May 1920 near the village of Bystryk near Kyiv. It was a part of the ill-fated offensive of the Budyonny's 1st Cavalry Army assault on the Polish-Ukrainian troops defending Kyiv after their offensive on Kyiv a month earlier, during the Polish-Bolshevik War.

The Bolshevik assault started on 26 May, with the aim of cutting off the Polish 2nd and 3rd Armies and encircling them in a huge pocket. One of the assaulting divisions of the Cavalry Army, the Soviet 11th Cavalry Division, managed to break the front line between the two Polish armies and assaulted a fortified village of Bystrzyk, defended only by a single infantry company of the Polish 50th Kresy Rifles Regiment. After a short skirmish, the Poles were defeated. As the Cossack cavalry took no prisoners, all 75 Poles were killed, including prisoners and wounded in action. The exact Russian losses are unknown. Shortly after the skirmish, the commander of the Polish 13th Infantry Division, Gen. Franciszek Paulik, dispatched the reserve Polish 40th Infantry Regiment, but it was too late to relieve the defenders of Bystryk and the regiment lacked enough firepower to defeat an entire division. Because of that, the Polish tactical counter-offensive was repelled. The following day, the Russian division expanded the gap, broke through to the other side of the front and managed to drive approximately 15 kilometres towards the rear of the Polish forces.

This created a gap in the Polish front and endangered the rear of the Polish 13th division. The commander of the Polish 6th Army, Gen. Wacław Iwaszkiewicz, ordered a counter-assault group to be created out of all available reserves. The group, commanded by Jerzy Sawicki, was composed of two regiments of his 3rd Cavalry Brigade, as well as two infantry battalions from the 19th Infantry Regiment and two batteries of field artillery. The Polish counter-assault started at 1 o'clock in the night of 1 June 1920. The Poles caught the 11th Cavalry Division by surprise in the village of Starościńce. Although the forces of both sides were more or less equal, the surprise was decisive and the Russians sounded a retreat after a short skirmish. After a successful pursuit, the 11th Division was forced back to its original positions from before the offensive started.
