= Juliusz Żórawski =

Juliusz Żórawski (2 October 1898 in Kraków – 24 November 1967 in Kraków) was a Polish architect, theoretist of architecture, interior designer, professor of Politechnika Krakowska (since 1945).

He was a designer of representative flat buildings in Warsaw (e.g. Dom Wedla on Puławska street, 1935–1938; Feniks on Mickiewicz street, 1937–1939), public buildings (e.g. Atlantic cinema in Warsaw, 1930, with Oskar Sosnowski) and numerous villas. He was an author of architecture composition works, which most notable is O budowie formy architektonicznej (1962).

Juliusz was the son of Kazimierz Żorawski, a Polish mathematician and friend of Marie Curie.
