= Battle of the Berezina (1920) =

Coordinates: 54°13′54″N 28°30′31″E

Second Battle of Berezina
- Part of Polish–Soviet War
Date	15 May – 8 June 1920
Location	Berezina
Result	Indecisive

Belligerents
Russian SFSR	Poland

Commanders and leaders
(Russian Soviet Federative Socialist Republic) Mikhail Tukhachevsky (Russian Soviet Federative Socialist Republic) August Kork	(Second Polish Republic) Kazimierz Sosnkowski (Second Polish Republic) Leonard Skierski

The Second Battle of Berezina was fought on 15 May 1920 around the Berezina in the Polish-Soviet war. It ended indecisively.

== Battle of Berezina (1920) ==
Led by August Kork, six divisions of the Soviet XV Army, crossed the Dvina River on 15 May 1920 under orders from Trotsky and Tukhachevsky, and attacked the left wing of the Polish Army, before Pilsudski could attack the Zhlobin-Mogilev rail network. The Soviet XVI Army soon took Borisov under siege. Advancing seventy miles, the Soviet line extended from Koziany to Lake Pelic before Polish General Kazimierz Sosnkowski formed the First Army at Švenčionys and General Leonard Skierski formed a second group in Lahoysk, and prepared to encircle the Soviet advancement. However, on 8 June, Tukhachevsky retreated to the Auta and Berezina rivers.

== See also ==
- Battle of Berezina (1919)
