= Battle of Pinsk =

Battle of Polish-Soviet War

- Part of Polish–Soviet War
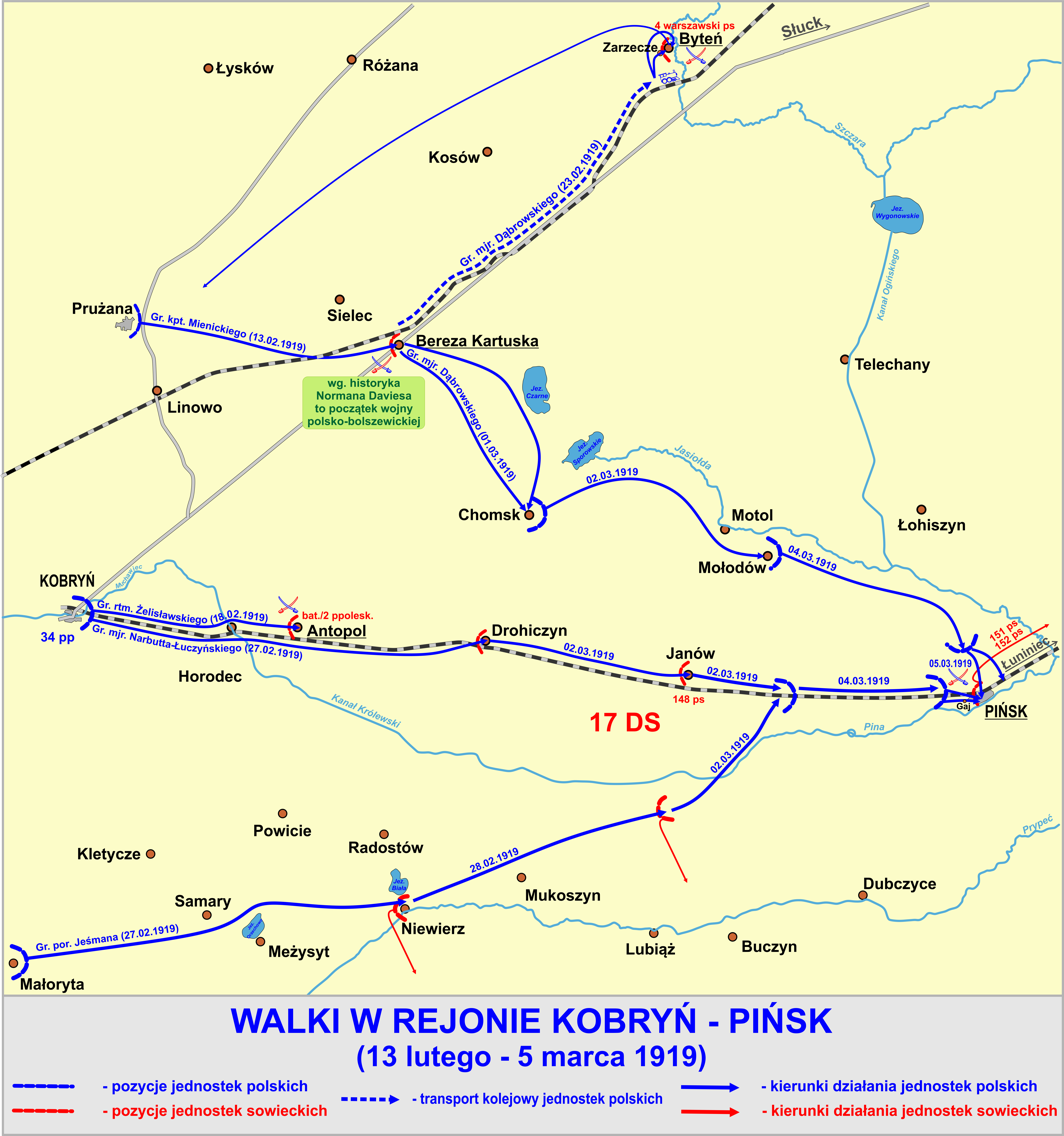
Date	23 February – 5 March 1919
Location	near Pinsk, Civil Administration of the Eastern Lands
Result	Polish victory

Belligerents
Second Polish Republic	Russian SFSR

Commanders and leaders
Aleksander Narbutt-Łuczyński; Władysław Dąbrowski	G.M. Bobrowski; Roman Łągwa

Casualties and losses
Unknown	At least 150 dead, wounded or imprisoned

The Battle of Pinsk was an engagement of the Polish–Soviet War that took place from 23 February 1919 to 5 March 1919. It was fought between the Second Polish Republic and the Russian Soviet Federative Socialist Republic. The battle ended in a Polish victory.

== Background ==
In the aftermath of the Russian Revolution and the end of World War I, Vladimir Lenin's Russian Soviet Federative Socialist Republic (RSFSR) sought to export revolution by moving forces west to occupy the vacuum left by former German forces. He saw the newly independent Poland (formed in late 1918) as the bridge his Red Army would have to cross in order to assist and foment other revolutionary movements in Europe.

After the German garrisons were withdrawn from the Eastern Front following the Armistice, both Soviet Russian armies and Polish ones moved in to fill the vacuum. The newly independent Polish state and the Soviet government each sought territorial expansion in the region. Polish and Russian troops first clashed in February 1919, with the conflict developing into the Polish–Soviet War.

== Operations ==
In the Pinsk region the 17th Rifle Division operated in the region of Janow along with Rifle regiments that supported the army with two artillery batteries and an armored train. Information gathered by Polish intelligence also sygnalised the presence of unfriendly divisions in Kosava and Byteń These were "Polish" divisions (which were actually established in the Russian SFSR, although had Poles in it) of the 4th Revolutionary Warsaw Regiment and a division of the Masovian Hussars Regiment.

Polish Supreme Command decided to attack Pinsk and concentrated on this direction with three tactical groups. In the region of Bereza Kartuska Władysław Dąbrowski's group centred itself there. In the region of Malaryta there was a group with 150 soldiers.

On 23 March the command of the Podlasie Group developed the plan to attack Pinsk. The planned start of the attack was determined on 27 March. Before this date Dąbrowski's unit loaded two companies into an armored train in Bereza Kartuska and rode to Byteń, where he surprised the Soviet Warsaw Rifle Regiment, which was unprepared to defend. With the loss of a few of his soldiers, he inflicted many losses onto the enemy amounting to 150 dead, wounded or imprisoned.

As planned, on 27 February, the attack groups started operations. After minor skirmishes with the enemy retreating, Narbutt-Łuczyński took Drohiczyn, and on 3 March, together with Jeśman's unit, he took Janow Poleski (Ivanava), where 20 were captured. Dąbrowski's division on the night of 27–28 February captured Kosów, and on 1 March Chomsk, establishing contact with Narbutt-Łuczyński in Janow Poleski. That was where the plan was detailed. Dąbrowski's division was to go around Pinsk from the east towards Halewo and cut the enemies area of retreat while the group "Korbyń" was to move along the railway track straight to Pinsk. Damage to the railway caused that the Poles were deprived of the opportunity to have infantry support them from the armored train in the region.

On 5 March at around 11:00 Polish divisions started the attack. In the first dash towards the railway station the 34th Infantry Regiment attacked, while around Gaj was the Russian Officers' Legion. Around 14:00 Pinsk was captured, while the Red Army, to avoid encirclement, hastily retreated towards the southern shore of Pina. Exhausted by the forced march, the Polish were unable to keep up with the quickly retreating enemy. The cavalry of Dąbrowski's unit failed to cut off the Red Army's retreat route.

== Works cited ==
- Davies, Norman (2003) [1972]. White Eagle, Red Star: The Polish-Soviet War 1919–20 and 'the Miracle on the Vistula'. London: Pimlico. ISBN 978-0-7126-0694-3.
- Fischer, Louis (1964). The Life of Lenin. London: Weidenfeld and Nicolson.
- Rice, Christopher (1990). Lenin: Portrait of a Professional Revolutionary. London: Cassell. ISBN 978-0-304-31814-8.
- Service, Robert (2000). Lenin: A Biography. London: Macmillan. ISBN 978-0-333-72625-9.
- Volkogonov, Dmitri (1994). Lenin: Life and Legacy. Translated by Shukman, Harold. London: HarperCollins. ISBN 978-0-00-255123-6.
- White, James D. (2001). Lenin: The Practice and Theory of Revolution. European History in Perspective. Basingstoke, England: Palgrave. ISBN 978-0-333-72157-5.
