= Battle of Berezina (1919) =

Battle during the Polish Soviet War

- Part of Polish–Soviet War
Date	1919
Location	Berezina
Result	Polish victory

Belligerents
Poland	Russian SFSR

Commanders and leaders
Gen. Stanisław Szeptycki; Gen. Władysław Sikorski	Unknown

Casualties and losses
Unknown	1,000 captured

The First Battle of Berezina was fought around the Berezina in the Polish-Soviet war. It ended with a Polish victory and the capture of 1000 Soviet prisoners.

== Background ==
The Soviet Western Army retreated to the Rivers Dvina and Berezina following the successful capture of Wilno, Minsk and Lwow in the Borders region. Pilsudski's Polish Army, consisting of the Northern Group, commanded by General Stanisław Szeptycki, and the Southern Group, commanded by General Władysław Sikorski, were linked by the end of autumn.

== See also ==
- Battle of the Berezina (1920)
