= Wola Osowińska =

- Village
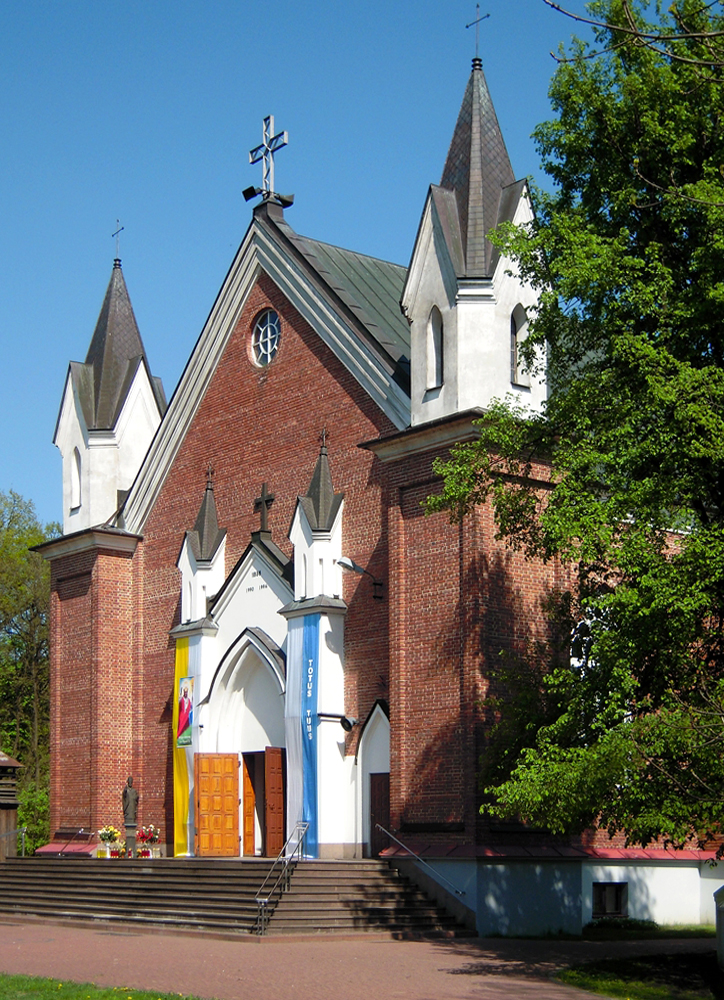
- Church of the Assumption of the Virgin Mary

- Location within Poland
- Coordinates: 51°44′N 22°28′E
- Country: Poland
- Voivodeship: Lublin
- County: Radzyń
- Gmina: Borki

Population
  - Total: 1,110

Wola Osowińska [ˈvɔla ɔsɔˈviɲska] is a village in the administrative district of Gmina Borki, within Radzyń County, Lublin Voivodeship, in eastern Poland.

== Notable people ==
- Zdzisław Krasnodębski, Polish fighter pilot
