= Berezina =

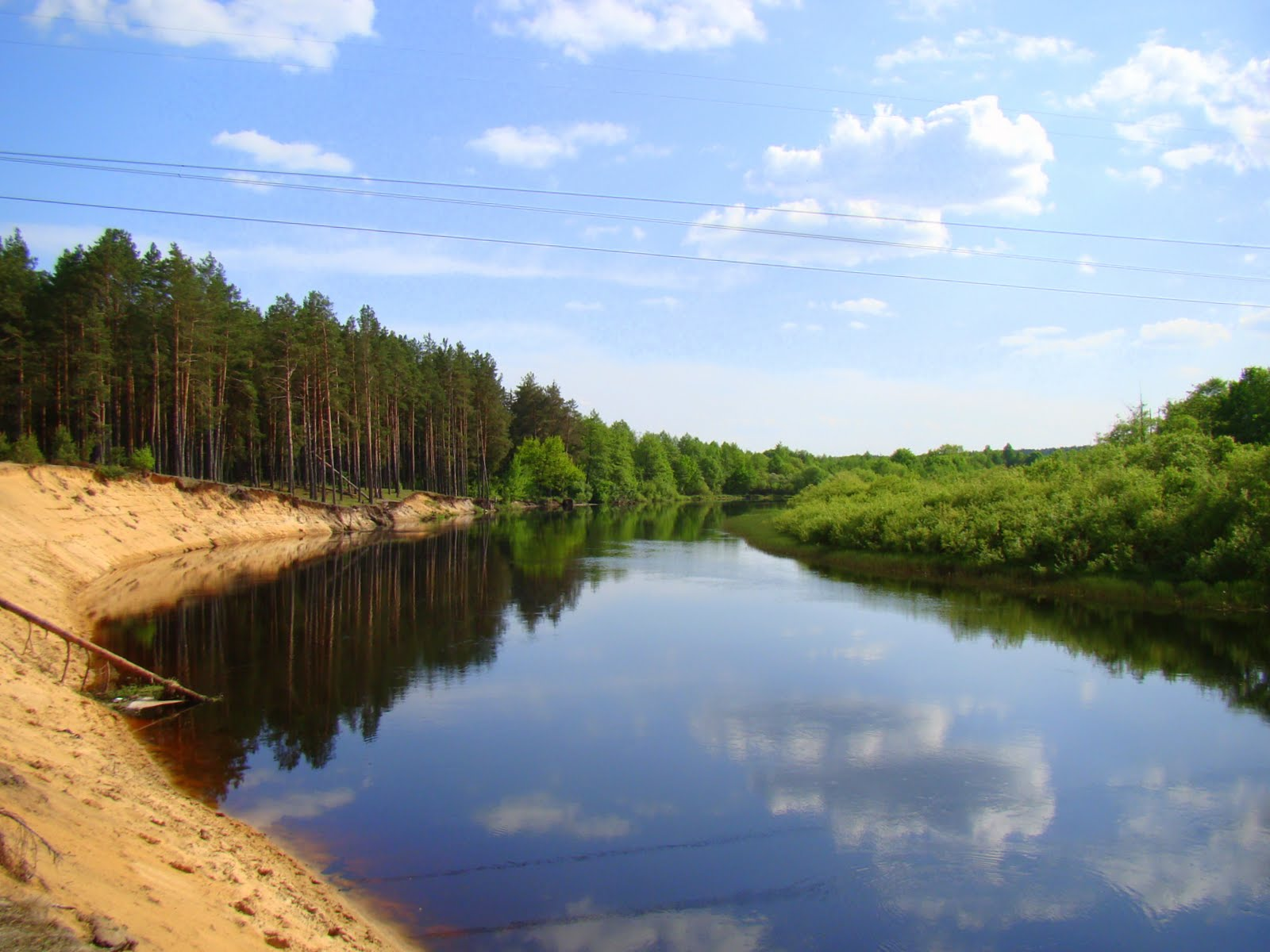
- Berezina River in Belarus

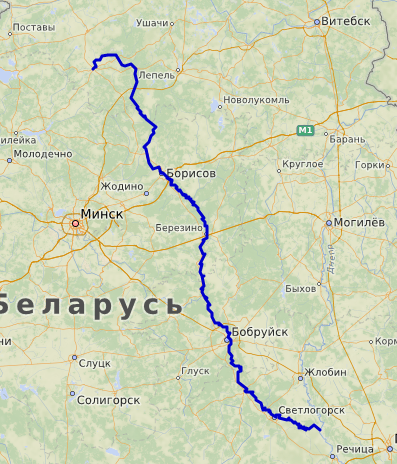
- Native name: Бярэзіна (Belarusian)

Location
- Country: Belarus

Physical characteristics
- Source
  - location: Belarus
- Mouth: Dnieper
  - coordinates: 52°32′59″N 30°15′00″E
- Length: 561 km (349 mi)
- Basin size: 24,500 km^{2} (9,500 sq mi)

Basin features
- Progression: Dnieper→ Dnieper–Bug estuary→ Black Sea

The Berezina or Byarezina (Belarusian: Бярэзіна, romanized: Biarezina, IPA: [bʲaˈrɛzʲinɐ]; Russian: Березина) is a river in Belarus and a right tributary of the Dnieper. The river starts in the Berezinsky Biosphere Reserve. The length of the Berezina is 613 kilometres (381 mi). The width of the river is 15–20 m, the maximum is 60 m. The banks are low (up to 0.5 m), steep in some areas (up to 1.5 m high), sandy, and the floodplain is swampy. The Berezina usually freezes over in the first half of December.

Its main tributaries are Bobr, Klyava, Ol'sa and Ala from the left and Hayna and Svislach from the right. The Berezinsky Biosphere Reserve by the river is on the UNESCO list of biosphere reserves. Peat bogs cover 430 km^{2} and thus occupy a large part of the reserve. These open peat zones have remained virtually untouched and are among Europe's largest bogs.

== Settlements ==
Cities and towns on the Berezina from north to south include:

- Dokshytsy
- Svislach
- Barysaw
- Babruysk
- Svyetlahorsk

== Historical significance ==
The Berezina has been the site of several battles.

In the Great Northern War, Charles XII of Sweden's army crossed the Berezina on 25 June 1708, during his campaign against Peter the Great of Russia.

Napoleon Bonaparte's army suffered heavy losses (about 50,000) when they were crossing the Berezina in November 1812, during the retreat from Russia (see Battle of Berezina). Since then, "Berezina" has been used in French as a synonym for catastrophe. Charles Joseph Minard made a famous visualization of the army's fate.

There were military actions between Germany and Russia at the Berezina River in 1917–1918.

Several armies in German Wehrmacht Army Group Centre were entrapped and prevented from crossing the Berezina in June 1944, during the envelopment phases of the Bobruysk and Minsk Offensives, within the closing phases of Operation Bagration in World War II.
