= Lech Wyszczelski =

Polish military historian

Lech Wyszczelski (born 1942) is a Polish military historian and author of books on Central European history of the 20th century. A retired colonel in the Polish army and professor at various universities, he has written 36 books and 420 articles on military history, notably on the Polish-Bolshevik War and the pre-war Polish army.

He graduated from the Historical-Political Faculty of the Dzerzhinsky Political-Military Academy in Warsaw in 1973 and received, in 1979, a doctorate there. In 1986, he received the habilitation at the Warsaw Academy of General Staff. In 1998, he received permanent (full) professorship from the president of Poland.

He currently holds a post at the Academy of National Defence in Warsaw, the Pułtusk-based Wyższa Szkoła Humanistyczna im. A. Gieysztora, and University of Natural Sciences and Humanities in Siedlce. Between 1988 and 1990, he was also a member of the Council for the Protection of Struggle and Martyrdom Sites. In 2012, he received the Golden Medal for Long Service for 30 years of service in the Polish army.

Among the most notable of his books is a series of monographs on various operations of the Polish-Bolshevik War, including Kiev 1920, Warsaw 1920, Battle at the Outskirts of Warsaw; 13-25th of August 1920 and The Undeclared War. Polish-Russian military activity of 1919. Among the works of a wider scope are Polish Military Thought 1914-1939, What Beck and Rydz Knew, History of Military Thought and Piłsudski's Army. He is also the author of a monograph on the civilian and military radio stations during the Warsaw Uprising in 1944.
