= Jerzy Dąbrowski (lieutenant colonel) =

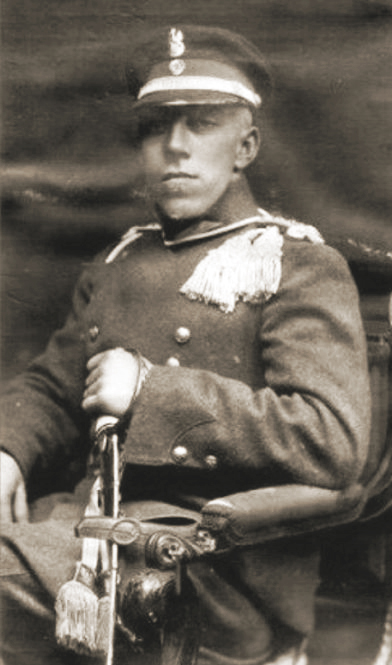
Jerzy Dąbrowski 1919

Jerzy Dąbrowski, Dąmbrowski, Dombrowski Junosza coat of arms, nom de guerre "Łupaszka" (born 29 April 1889 in Suwałki, executed under Soviet jurisdiction on the night of the 16th to 17 December 1940, after extensive torture at a prison in Mińsk) – cavalry officer with the rank of podpułkownik (Lieutenant Colonel) in the Polish Army of the Second Polish Republic, guerilla fighter.

Of notable men who served under Lt. Col. Jerzy Dąmbrowski were Capt. Witold Pilecki (at the time of the Polish-Soviet war, 1918–1921) and Maj. Henryk Dobrzański "Hubal" (during the Polish Defensive war, 1939).

== Decorations ==
- Silver Cross of the Order Virtuti Militari (1922)
- Cross of Valour, four times
- Golden Cross of Merit
- Military Cross of Merit of Central Lithuania

== See also ==
- Polish contribution to World War II
- Polish Secret State
