= 52nd Rifle Division (RSFSR) =

- Red Army insignia of the Civil War period
- Active: 1918 August 3 – 1921
- Country: Russian Soviet Federated Socialist Republic
- Branch: Red Army
- Type: Infantry
- Engagements: Russian Civil War; Polish–Soviet War

The Western Rifle Division (Polish: Zachodnia Dywizja Strzelców) was formed during the Russian Civil War, and later redesignated the 52nd Rifle Division on 9 June 1919. Most of its members were Poles until mid-1919. It was reduced to a brigade and disbanded after the end of the Russian Civil War in 1921.

== Formation ==
The Western Division was formed in August 1918 in the area of Moscow and Tambov at the initiative of Social Democracy of the Kingdom of Poland and Lithuania (SDKPiL) and the Polish Socialist Party – Left (PPS-Lewica), part of the Moscow Military District. A Polish communist regiment, the Revolutionary Red Warsaw Regiment made up its cadre, and in the beginning it was mostly composed of Polish volunteers. According to its order of battle (below) each of its brigades consisted of two battalions of infantry and one battalion of cavalry.

During the Soviet westward offensive of 1918–1919, it was part of the Western Army from November of that year. It fought against the Polish Self-Defence of Lithuania and Belarus units and later the Polish Army of the newly created Second Polish Republic in the opening phase of the Polish–Soviet War. Spearheading the Soviet westward offensive of 1918–1919, the division's 5th Vilnius Rifle Regiment occupied Vilnius in January 1919.

== Polish–Soviet War ==
The division sustained heavy losses during the fights at Baranavichy against forces of Gen. Stanisław Szeptycki (part of the Polish Vilna offensive). In February, according to Polish intelligence, the division had 5,067 soldiers and 15 machine guns.

Following these losses, in June 1919 the division was heavily reinforced with Russians, Belarusians and Ukrainians and lost its Polish character; it was then (9 June) renamed as 52nd Rifle Division of the Red Army. Commanders of the division were commissars Stanisław Bobiński and Stefan Żbikowski.

Between March and July, the division fought against Polish troops in the area of Minsk and Maladzyechna. In August it fought in the direction of Baranavichy, then in the area of Barysaw and Byerazino in September and October, and in the area of Lyepyel in November.

== Russian Civil War ==
In November 1919, the 52nd was transferred south to join the 14th Army, fighting against the Armed Forces of South Russia on the Southern Front. The division transferred to the 8th Army in December, to the 9th Army in February 1920, and to the 13th Army in April. It fought against Pyotr Wrangel's White Army in Crimea, advancing towards Melitopol between May and July.

In August and September the 52nd fought in the defense of the Kakhovka bridgehead. In September it was transferred to the 6th Army, fighting in the Northern Taurida Operation of the Southern Front in October and November. During the operation, the 52nd fought in the area of Agayman and Nyzhni Sirohozy, and was temporarily directly subordinated to the front command in November. Between 7 and 17 November, the division fought in the Perekop–Chongar operation, crossing the Sivash and helping to capture the Ishun fortified position. The operation concluded with the final defeat and evacuation of the White Army in Crimea.

In December, the 52nd protected the Black Sea coast in the estuaries of the Dnieper and Bug. On 13 December it received the honorific Yekaterinburg.

=== 1921 ===
In early 1921, the division participated in the suppression of anarchist leader Nestor Makhno's Revolutionary Insurgent Army of Ukraine in the Nikolayev area. In accordance with orders of the Kharkov Military District of 23 April and 11 June and a 6th Army order of 29 April, the 52nd was reorganized as the 52nd Separate Rifle Brigade, directly subordinated to the district headquarters. It was soon renumbered as the 136th and by a district order of 12 October was used to form the 1st Brigade of the 25th Rifle Division.

== Order of Battle ==
=== Aug. 1918 – June 1919 ===
- 1st Rifle Brigade
  - Revolutionary Red Warsaw Regiment
  - 3rd Revolutionary Siedlce Regiment
  - Warsaw Hussar Regiment
  - 1st Light Artillery Half-Regiment
- 2nd Rifle Brigade
  - 2nd Revolutionary Lublin Regiment
  - 4th Revolutionary Warsaw Regiment
  - Masovian Uhlan Regiment
  - 2nd Light Artillery Half-Regiment
- 3rd Rifle Brigade
  - 5th Vilnius Rifle Regiment
  - 6th Grodno Revolutionary Regiment
  - Warsaw Hussar Regiment
  - 3rd Light Artillery Half-Regiment
- Support units

== Bibliography ==
- Dvoinykh, L.V.; Kariaeva, T.F.; Stegantsev, M.V., eds. (1993). Центральный государственный архив Советской армии [Central State Archive of the Soviet Army] (in Russian). Vol. 2. Minneapolis: Eastview Publications. ISBN 1-879944-03-0.
- Odziemkowski, Janusz (2021). "Decyzje, które ocaliły niepodległość". Pamięć i Sprawiedliwość. 38 (2). doi:10.48261/pis213802. ISSN 1427-7476.
- Smoliński, Aleksander (2019-12-30). "Zachodnia Dywizja Strzelecka Armii Czerwonej. Przyczynek do dziejów polskojęzycznych formacji Robotniczo-Chłopskiej Armii Czerwonej w latach 1917–1919". Acta Universitatis Lodziensis. Folia Historica (105): 59–84. doi:10.18778/0208-6050.105.05. ISSN 2450-6990.
