= Outline of the Polish–Soviet War =

Topical guide to Wikipedia articles about the Polish Soviet War

Polish–Soviet War
- Part of Western Front of the Russian Civil War, Ukrainian War of Independence, Lithuanian Wars of Independence and Latvian War of Independence
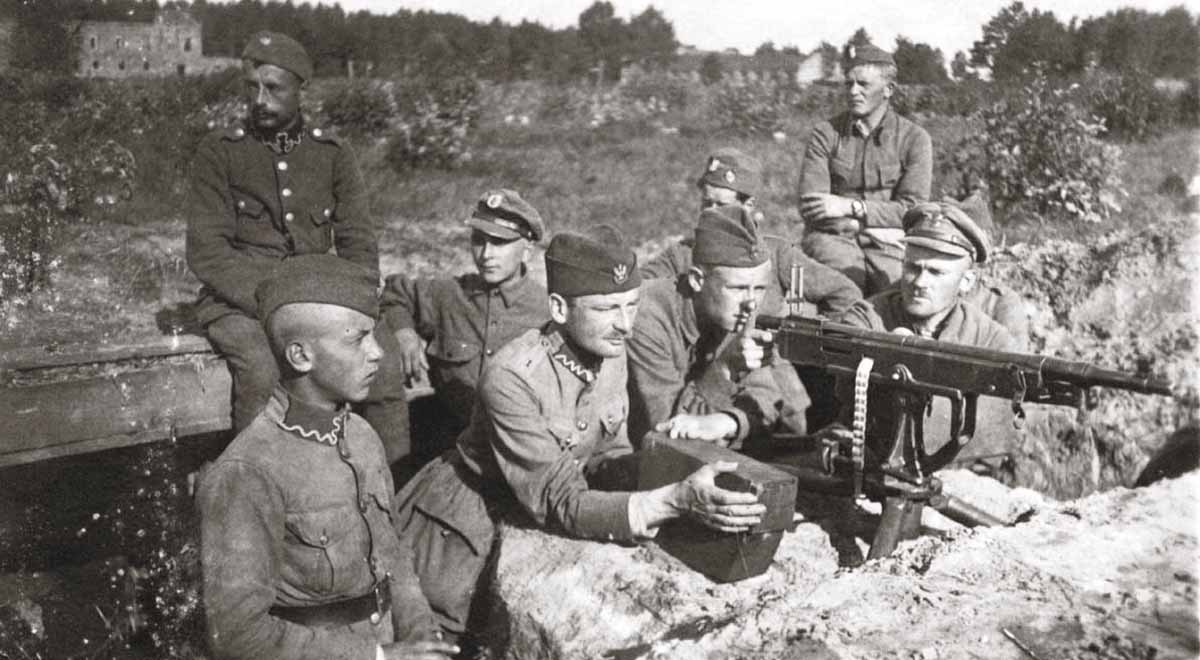
Date	1918/1919
Location	Central and Eastern Europe
Result	Polish victory
Territorial changes	Poland retained control of modern-day Western Ukraine and Western Belarus (Kresy in interwar Poland); Soviet forces retained control of modern-day Eastern Ukraine and Eastern Belarus

Belligerents
Soviet Russia; Soviet Ukraine; Soviet Belarus; Polrewkom	Poland; Ukraine (1920); Belarus (1920); Latvia (1920) (Note: Battle of Daugavpils)

The following outline is provided as an overview of and topical guide to the Polish–Soviet War.

The Polish–Soviet War was fought from 1919 to 1921 between the Second Polish Republic on one side and Soviet Russia and Soviet Ukraine on the other. Poland allied with the Ukrainian People's Republic in April 1920 and drove east, taking Kiev on 7 May. A Red Army counter-offensive pushed the Poles back to Warsaw, where they won an unexpected victory in the Battle of Warsaw between 12 and 25 August 1920. The fighting stopped with a ceasefire on 18 October 1920, and the Treaty of Riga of 18 March 1921 set Poland's eastern border, which lasted until 1939.

== Overview ==
- Polish–Soviet War
- Causes of the Polish–Soviet War – the territorial and political disputes that brought the two states to war
- Controversies of the Polish–Soviet War – contested episodes in the conduct of both armies
- List of battles of the Polish–Soviet War – the engagements of the war, in order
- Polish–Soviet War order of battle: Poland – how the Polish Army was organized and who commanded it

== Background ==
- World War I
- Russian Civil War

== Related conflicts ==
- Polish–Lithuanian War – fighting between Poland and Lithuania from May 1919 to November 1920, largely over Vilnius and the Suwałki Region
- Sejny Uprising – Polish revolt against Lithuanian rule around Sejny, 23 August – 7 September 1919
- 1919 Polish coup attempt in Lithuania – plan by Piłsudski's Polish Military Organisation to seize Kaunas and install a pro-Polish cabinet; it was uncovered before it began

== Events ==
- Soviet westward offensive of 1918–1919 – Red Army advance west from November 1918 into ground left by the retreating German army
- Pinsk massacre – Polish troops shot thirty-five Jewish residents of Pinsk on 5 April 1919
- Morgenthau Report – findings of the American mission under Henry Morgenthau Sr. on violence against Jews in Poland, published in October 1919
- Vilna offensive – Polish attack of April 1919 that took Vilnius from the Red Army
- Operation Minsk – Polish operation that took Minsk on 8 August 1919
- Treaty of Warsaw (1920) – alliance with the Ukrainian People's Republic, signed 21 April 1920
- Kiev offensive (1920) – Polish and Ukrainian drive into Ukraine from 25 April 1920; Kiev fell on 7 May and the allies paraded there two days later
- SS Jolly George – London dockers refused to load arms bound for Poland in May 1920
- Suwałki Agreement – Polish–Lithuanian ceasefire and demarcation line of 7 October 1920, which left Vilnius unsettled
- Żeligowski's Mutiny – staged mutiny of 8 October 1920 that seized Vilnius; Żeligowski proclaimed the Republic of Central Lithuania four days later
- Slutsk uprising – Belarusian revolt against Soviet rule in late 1920
- Treaty of Riga – peace treaty of 18 March 1921 that ended the war

=== Battles ===
- Battle of Vilnius (January 1919) – 31 December 1918 – 5 January 1919, ending with the Red Army in the city
- Battle of Bereza Kartuska – 14 February 1919, counted by some historians as the first engagement of the war; the town was fought over again 21–26 July 1920
- Battle of Lida (1919) – Polish capture of Lida, 16–17 April 1919
- Battle of Berezina (1919) – Polish victory on the Berezina in 1919
- Battle of Daugavpils – Operation Winter, the joint Polish–Latvian capture of the city, 3–5 January 1920
- Battle of Koziatyn – Polish cavalry raid of 25–27 April 1920 during the Kiev offensive
- Battle of the Berezina (1920) – Soviet May offensive on the Berezina, 15 May – 8 June 1920
- First Battle of Grodno (1920) – Soviet capture of Grodno, 19–20 July 1920
- Battle of Warsaw (1920) – 12–25 August 1920, the decisive battle of the war
- Battle of Radzymin (1920) – 13–16 August 1920, fought about 20 km northeast of Warsaw
- Battle of Ossów – 14 August 1920, fought in the fields near Wołomin outside Warsaw
- Battle of Cyców – 15–16 August 1920, which kept Soviet troops clear of the forces massing behind the Wieprz
- Battle of Lwów (1920) – Budyonny's 1st Cavalry Army attacked the city from 13 August 1920 and abandoned the siege on 20 August
- Battle of Zadwórze – delaying action of 17 August 1920, sometimes called the Polish Thermopylae
- Battle of Komarów – cavalry fighting against the 1st Cavalry Army, 20 August – 2 September 1920
- Battle of Białystok – 22 August 1920, fought as the Red Army fell back
- Battle of Dytiatyn – stand of 16 September 1920, also called a Polish Thermopylae
- Battle of the Niemen River – 15–25 September 1920, the second-largest battle of the war

== Organizations ==
=== Polish ===
- Blue Army – Haller's army, raised in France from 1917 and moved to Poland in 1919
- Volunteer Army – formation raised by the Council of National Defense on 1 July 1920; its regiments were parceled out to other armies
- First Polish Army (1920) – army raised in March 1920 that defended Warsaw itself in August, then joined the pursuit to the Niemen
- Polish Northern Front (1920) – front created by Piłsudski in May 1920, whose armies helped win the Battle of Warsaw
- 1st Lithuanian–Belarusian Division – volunteer division of the Polish Army formed over December 1918 and January 1919
- 7th Air Escadrille – the Kościuszko Squadron, which counted twenty-one American pilots among its fliers
- Civil Administration of the Eastern Lands – Polish civil authority for the occupied east, established in February 1919 and wound up in September 1920
- Civil Administration of the Lands of Volhynia and Podolian Front – the equivalent authority for Volhynia and Podolia, created in January 1920

=== Soviet ===
- Red Cossacks – Bolshevik cavalry formation raised in Ukraine at the start of 1918
- Provisional Polish Revolutionary Committee – Polrevkom, set up at Smolensk on 23 July 1920 and installed at Białystok a week later
- Polish Soviet Socialist Republic – the Soviet Polish republic Polrevkom announced but never established
- Galician Soviet Socialist Republic – Soviet republic in eastern Galicia, 15 July – 21 September 1920, with its capital at Tarnopol
- Socialist Soviet Republic of Lithuania and Belorussia – Litbel, the merged Soviet republic created in February 1919

=== Ukrainian and Allied ===
- Ukrainian People's Republic – Petliura's state, Poland's ally from April 1920
- Ukrainian People's Army – the republic's regular army
- West Ukrainian People's Republic – Galician Ukrainian state that held most of eastern Galicia from November 1918 to July 1919
- Independent Cossack Brigade – Cossack unit of the Polish Army
- French Military Mission to Poland – French advisers to the Polish Army, in place from 1918 to 1939
- British Military Mission to Poland – the smaller British counterpart, led by Adrian Carton de Wiart
- Interallied Mission to Poland – Allied mission sent on 21 July 1920, which arrived too late to shape the Battle of Warsaw

== People ==
=== Polish ===
- Józef Piłsudski – chief of state and commander-in-chief
- Tadeusz Rozwadowski – chief of the general staff from July 1920, through the Battle of Warsaw
- Władysław Sikorski – commander of the Fifth Army north of Warsaw
- Józef Haller – commander of the Blue Army and, in 1920, inspector general of the Volunteer Army
- Edward Śmigły-Rydz – commander of the Third Army in the Kiev offensive
- Kazimierz Sosnkowski – deputy minister of military affairs from 1919 and minister from August 1920
- Stanisław Szeptycki – chief of the general staff until March 1919, later commander of the North-East Front and the Fourth Army
- Lucjan Żeligowski – the general who staged the seizure of Vilnius
- Franciszek Latinik – military governor of Warsaw and commander of the First Army
- Juliusz Rómmel – commander of the 1st Cavalry Division at Komarów
- Władysław Anders – commander of the 15th Poznań Uhlans, who later led the Polish II Corps
- Ignacy Skorupka – army chaplain killed at Ossów on 14 August 1920

=== Soviet ===
- Mikhail Tukhachevsky – commander of the Western Front and of the advance on Warsaw
- Alexander Yegorov – commander of the South-Western Front
- Semyon Budyonny – commander of the 1st Cavalry Army
- Joseph Stalin – chief political commissar of the South-Western Front
- Sergey Kamenev – commander-in-chief of the Red Army from July 1919
- Leon Trotsky – people's commissar for military and naval affairs
- Ieronim Uborevich – commander of the 14th Army on the South-Western Front
- August Kork – commander of the 15th Army in the drive on Warsaw
- Hayk Bzhishkyan – cavalry corps commander, known as Gai; interned with his troops in East Prussia in August 1920
- Ivar Smilga – head of the Western Front's revolutionary military council

=== Ukrainian and other ===
- Symon Petliura – head of the Ukrainian Directorate and Poland's ally
- Marko Bezruchko – Ukrainian general who led the defense of Zamość in 1920
- Stanisław Bułak-Bałachowicz – commander of an allied volunteer army; his nationality was argued over even at the time
- Isaac Babel – writer attached to the 1st Cavalry Army, whose 1920 diary fed into Red Cavalry
- Merian C. Cooper – American pilot in the Kościuszko Squadron, shot down and taken prisoner in July 1920

== Places ==
- Vilnius Region – the area around Vilnius, now in Lithuania and Belarus, disputed between Poland and Lithuania throughout the interwar period
- Suwałki Region – historical region in northeastern Poland, also claimed by Lithuania
- Foch Line – Polish–Lithuanian demarcation line proposed by the Entente in 1919
- Curzon Line – eastern boundary for Poland proposed by Lord Curzon in 1919 and offered again as a ceasefire line in July 1920; passed over at Riga and revived in 1945

== Aftermath ==
- Treaty of Riga – the settlement that held until the Soviet invasion of 1939
- Republic of Central Lithuania – the Vilnius statelet, absorbed into Poland on 18 April 1922
- Camps for Russian prisoners and internees in Poland (1919–1924) – Polish camps that held 80,000–85,000 Soviet prisoners; estimates of the dead range from 16,000 to 20,000
- Tuchola prisoner of war camp – the camp at the center of the argument over prisoner deaths
- Polish prisoners and internees in Soviet Russia and Lithuania (1919–1921) – captivity in which about 20,000 of some 51,000 Polish prisoners died
- Anti-Katyn – campaign that cites deaths in the Polish camps to play down the Katyn massacre
- S.S. Wimbledon case – Permanent Court of International Justice judgment of 17 August 1923 on a ship carrying munitions to the Polish naval base at Danzig

== Culture and society ==
- Żydokomuna – the antisemitic canard that Jews brought communism to Poland
- For our freedom and yours – Polish motto that the Soviet government also claimed during the war

== Works about the war ==
- Gwiaździsta eskadra – 1930 Polish film about the Kościuszko Squadron, directed by Leonard Buczkowski; every copy was destroyed after World War II
- Battle of Warsaw 1920 – Jerzy Hoffman's 2011 film about the battle, shot in 3D
- White Eagle, Red Star – Norman Davies's 1972 history of the war

== Bibliography ==
The works below all cover the Russian Civil War and carry extensive bibliographies for further research.

- Smith, S. A. (2017). Russia in Revolution: An Empire in Crisis, 1890 to 1928. New York: Oxford University Press.
- Engelstein, L. (2017). Russia in Flames: War, Revolution, Civil War, 1914–1921. New York: Oxford University Press.
- Figes, O. (1996). A People's Tragedy: A History of the Russian Revolution. New York: Viking.
- McMeekin, S. (2017). The Russian Revolution: A New History. New York: Basic Books.
- Smele, J. (2016). The "Russian" Civil Wars, 1916–1926: Ten Years That Shook the World. New York: Oxford University Press. (Note: Contains an extensive 46-page bibliography of English and non-English works on the "Russian" Civil Wars.)

== See also ==
- Category:Polish-Soviet War
- Index of articles related to the Russian Revolution and Civil War
