= Lwów pogrom (1918) =

Anti-Jewish attacks in Lwów, Poland

- Part of the 1918 Battle of Lemberg and pogroms during the Russian Civil War
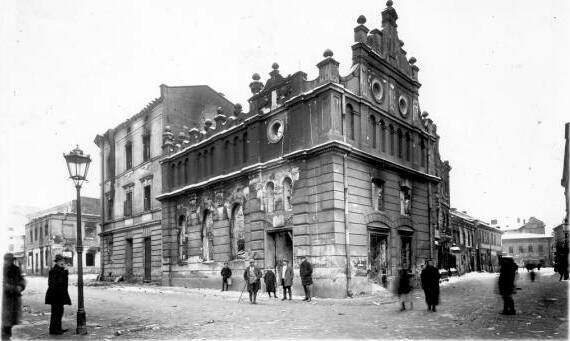
- The Jewish quarter after the pogrom
- Location: Lwów, Poland
- Date: 21–23 November 1918
- Deaths: 52–150 Jewish victims, up to 340 total
- Injuries: Over 443
- Perpetrators: Polish soldiers and civilians

The Lwów pogrom (Polish: pogrom lwowski, German: Lemberger Pogrom) was a pogrom perpetrated by Polish soldiers and civilians against the Jewish population of the city of Lwów (since 1991, Lviv, Ukraine). It happened on 21–23 November 1918, during the Polish–Ukrainian War that followed World War I.

During three days of unrest in the city, an estimated 52–150 Jewish residents were killed, and hundreds were injured. Non-Jewish casualties were also reported; they were mainly Ukrainian, and they outnumbered the Jewish fatalities. The total number of victims was reported to be 340. Roughly 1,600 people, including some soldiers, were arrested by Polish authorities during and after the pogrom. Seventy-nine accused pogromists were tried by Polish military courts, of whom 44 were convicted. Most of them received lenient sentences, ranging from 10 days to 18 months, but three executed.

The 1918 Lwów events were widely publicized in the international press. US President Woodrow Wilson appointed a commission, led by Henry Morgenthau, Sr., to investigate violence against the Jewish population in Poland. The Morgenthau Report was published in October 1919.

== Background ==
The Jewish population of Lwów had already been a victim of the Russian military pogrom which occurred on 27 September 1914, which resulted in the loss of 30–50 Jewish lives. After the First World War, on 1 November 1918, the Ukrainian National Council proclaimed the West Ukrainian People's Republic, with Lviv as its capital. A week later, the Regency Council of the Kingdom of Poland declared Poland's independence, and they formed a Polish government on 14 November 1918. The consequent Battle of Lwów lasted until 21 November 1918.

Galicia's Jews were caught in the post-World War I Polish-Ukrainian conflict, and they fell victim to a rising wave of pogroms across the region, fuelled by post-World War I lawlessness. In early 1918, a wave of pogroms swept Polish-inhabited towns of western Galicia. The pogroms were largely made up of demobilized army soldiers and deserters, and also Polish civilians. Throughout the 1918–1919 Polish-Ukrainian conflict, the warring forces used Jews as a scapegoat against their frustrations.

Before they withdrew from Lwów, the retreating Austrian forces let the criminals out of the prisons, some of whom volunteered to join the Polish militia and fight against the Ukrainians. The town was also full of Austrian army deserters. Polish authorities also armed a number of volunteers (including some former criminals) who promised to fight the Ukrainians. A sizable group of Polish volunteers in the city consisted of petty criminals. On 9–10 November, the Jews of Lwów formed a militia and declared their neutrality in the Polish-Ukrainian conflict over the city. With the exception of some instances of Jewish support for the Ukrainian side, including reports of Jewish militia aiding Ukrainian forces, Lwów's Jews remained officially neutral; the accounts of sporadic Jewish support for the Ukrainians would serve as a rationale for accusations that many Jews adopted the anti-Polish stance.

The criminal elements within the Polish forces sometimes engaged in theft or armed robbery while wearing Polish insignia. When these criminals were fired on by the Jewish self-defense militia, some Poles believed that the Jews were fighting against Poland. The West Ukrainian People's Republic respected Jewish neutrality and there were no incidents of anti-Jewish violence during the two weeks that the city was controlled by Ukrainian forces. Poles resented the proclaimed Jewish neutrality, and there were reports, leading to exaggerated rumors, that some Jews, including those in the militia, collaborated with the Ukrainians in various ways, including actively engaging the Polish forces. On the morning of 22 November, after taking the city the night before, amidst rumors that Lwów's Jews would be made to pay for their "neutrality" in the Polish-Ukrainian conflict, Polish forces interned and disarmed the Jewish militia.

When riots and pogroms broke out in the Jewish quarters after Polish forces managed to gain control of all parts of the city and the Jewish quarters, they encountered resistance from Jewish-Ukrainian sympathizers. The perpetrators of the riots and the pogroms included Polish soldiers and militia, civilians of various nationalities, and local criminals.

== Pogrom ==
According to American historian William W. Hagen, Polish troops, officers, civilians, criminals, and militia volunteers began the sacking, pillaging and burning of the town's Jewish quarter following the retreat of main Ukrainian forces and their disarming of the Jewish militia. Hagen quotes Jewish eyewitnesses who claim that as the Ukrainian soldiers retreated, a festive mood came over the Polish fighters as they anticipated the reward for their fighting and looting of Jewish stores and homes.

In addition to looting and killing, women were raped by the Polish mobs, according to historian Alexander Prusin. First-hand accounts differ. For example, according to a report by one Jewish eyewitness, many victims gave testimonies that rioting Polish soldiers claimed that their officers allowed them 48 hours to pillage Jewish quarters as a reward for capturing the city from the Ukrainians. A report prepared for the Polish Foreign Ministry noted that the Polish Army "burned with desire for revenge" against the Jews, and soldiers wrongly believed that an order had been issued commanding a "punitive expedition" against the Jews. This report found no evidence that such an order had been issued, but it noted that two full days passed before the troops participating in the pillaging were ordered to desist. Hagen wrote that an investigation by Israel Cohen on behalf of the British Zionist Organization reported that Army Chief of Staff Antoni Jakubski told Jewish leaders in Lwów protesting the pogrom that the violence was a "punitive expedition into the Jewish quarter, and that it could not be stopped."

According to historian Carole Fink, Mączyński delayed the implementation of a 22 November order for martial law from Brigadier General Bolesław Roja for a day and a half. In the interim, Mączyński issued inflammatory proclamations of supposed acts of Jewish treachery against Polish troops using what has been described as "medieval terminology". One thing he claimed was that Jews had attacked Poles with axes. Fire officials cordoned off the Jewish quarters for 48 hours. They allowed many buildings, including 3 synagogues, to burn. The killing and burning in the quarter had already been done by the time Mączyński allowed patrols to enter the area.

Joseph Tenenbaum, a leader of the Jewish militia and eyewitness to the pogrom, wrote that troops cut off the Jewish quarter and that patrols of 10–30 men, each led by an officer and armed with grenades and rifles went through the quarter banging on doors. Doors not opened were blown open with grenades. Each house was systematically plundered, and its occupants were beaten and shot. Shops were likewise looted, with the stolen goods loaded onto army trucks. William Hagen wrote that according to a Jewish report, a Polish officer bashed in the head of a Jewish infant. A Jewish eyewitness claimed to have seen a young Polish officer twirl a four-week-old Jewish infant by the legs, threatening to bash it against the floor while asking the mother "why are there so many Jewish bastards?" The Polish Foreign Ministry report concluded that during the days of the pogrom "the authorities did not fulfill their responsibilities". The report noted that delegations of both Christians and Polish Jews hoping to end the violence had been turned away by officials, and that Polish officials and military commanders had spread false inflammatory charges against Jews, including claims that Jews were waging an armed struggle against Poland. Several Polish officers, according to the report, took part in the killings and pillaging, which they said continued for a week afterward under the guise of searching for weapons.

In his 1919 report, Henry Morgenthau concludes that Lemberg and the cities of Lida, Wilna, and Minsk, were captured by Polish troops, and "the excesses were committed by the soldiers who were capturing the cities and not by the civilian population." Although Jewish eyewitnesses claimed that Poles committed the pogrom, Mączyński, the Polish commander, who before the pogrom had issued anti-Jewish pamphlets, blamed Ukrainian criminals for initiating it. He claimed that they were the most violent group among the rioters. He also claimed that most Jews were killed during the time of Ukrainian control over the city. Polish media blamed Jews for staging the pogrom. In 1971, Adam Ciołkosz, a former leader of the Polish Socialist Party who arrived in Lwów on 21 November as a 16-year-old scout, recalled that rumors circulated that Jews had fired on Polish troops and that the Polish army tried to stop the pogroms.

According to William Hagen, the Polish forces also humiliated the Jews. Some examples are forcing a group of Jewish gymnasium students to participate in compulsory labor and "pranking" people. They were forced to jump over tables, forced to work in the most demeaning jobs (like cleaning latrines), had their beards pulled, and forced to dance to the delight of Polish onlookers. One drunken soldier tried to cut off an elderly Jewish man's earlocks, but when the man resisted, he shot him and plundered the corpse. Hagen also states that according to Jewish witnesses, Polish civilians, including members of the intelligentsia, took part in murdering and robbing Jews. He noted that in the chaos of war, the Polish army allowed for the recruitment of common criminals released from local prisons along with deserters from the Habsburg, German, and Russian armies. This eventually caused multiple issues.

Polish forces brought order to the city after one or two days (reports vary), on 23 November or 24 November. During the pogrom, according to a report by the Polish foreign ministry, over 50 two and three-story apartment buildings were destroyed as were 500 Jewish businesses. Two thousand Jews were left homeless, and material losses amounted to 20 million contemporary dollars.

== Aftermath ==
Hundreds of individuals accused of participation in the pogrom were arrested by Polish authorities. Promises of material compensation were also made.

For several months after the pogrom, Jews in Lviv were subjected to ongoing robberies, searches, and arrests at the hands of Polish forces. As a result of Jewish protests in January 1919, several Polish units, including the local military commander's security service, were disbanded. An all Jewish unit of around 1000 men was formed in the army of the West Ukrainian National Republic. The Council of Ministers of the West Ukrainian People's Republic also provided financial assistance to Jewish victims of the pogrom.

During the spring offensive of the Polish army, in 1919, there were further pogroms with fatalities organized by the Polish population of Galicia with the participation of soldiers, including the Pinsk massacre. All those pogroms meant that Galicia (where Lwów was located) and the Polish state as a whole, became an inhospitable, dangerous place for Jews, with no intention of accepting them as fellow citizens. For this reason, many Jewish residents of Galicia left for postwar Austria, when the region became part of Poland.

The events were widely reported by the European and American press. including The New York Times. News reports of the massacre were later used as a means of pressuring the Polish delegation during the Paris peace conference into signing the Minority Protection Treaty (the Little Treaty of Versailles). In 1921, the events resulted in the Polish government awarding liberal minority rights for the Polish Jewish population in the March Constitution.

International outrage at a series of similar acts of violence committed by the Polish military (Pinsk massacre) and the civilian population against the Jews (Kielce pogrom) led to the appointment of an investigation commission by the United States President Woodrow Wilson in June 1919. On 3 October 1919, the commission, led by Henry Morgenthau, Sr., published its findings. According to the Morgenthau Report, excesses in Lwów were "political as well as anti-Semitic in character". At the same time, the Morgenthau Report cleared the Polish government of responsibility for the events and attributed the casualties to "the chaotic and unnatural state of affairs". Independent investigations by the British and American missions in Poland stated that there were no clear conclusions and that foreign press reports were exaggerated.

The Polish government also investigated the Lwów events. A report prepared on 17 December 1918 for the Foreign Ministry of Poland emphasized the role played by criminals released during the struggle over the city and recruited by the Polish Armed Forces. According to the report, this resulted in a "tragic and vicious circle" when a soldier fighting for the Polish cause "robbed at every opportunity and wherever he could." The report noted that as of December, sentences had not been passed for 40 soldiers, along with one thousand civilians identified as "criminals" who had been jailed for robbery and murder. There was no evidence that there had been any desire to immediately stop the pogrom. According to Alexander Victor Prusin, the Polish point of view was that the events were distorted willfully by the Jews. Prusin notes that Jewish news agencies covering the pogrom in USA and Europe had "widely publicized and highly exaggerated its scope". The international response to the pogrom was viewed in Poland as proof of an "international Jewish conspiracy", and Polish media attempted to dispel "Jewish slander". However, Prusin states that the Polish version of events was "much further from the truth than the Jewish one", blaming "Ukrainians and Jewish hoodlums" for staging the pogrom. This version was endorsed by the Polish government agencies.

Roughly 1,600 people were for arrested on suspicion of participating in the pogrom, of whom 79 were prosecuted by Polish military courts. Overall, 44 people were convicted. Most of them received lenient sentences, ranging from 10 days to 18 months in prison. Three pogromists, however, were found guilty of murdering Jews and executed by firing squad. According to internal investigation by the Jewish Rescue Committee (Żydowski Komitet Ratunkowy) held alongside the official state investigation, most rapes, robberies and murders were committed by unidentified soldiers.

== Casualties ==
The initial reports on the number of casualties of the pogroms were exaggerated, sensationalist in nature, and often embellished. The estimated number of victims was as high as 3,000. The large casualty figures and graphic details were transmitted through Berlin, where the new German government disseminated them for political propaganda reasons in hopes that they would affect the peace negotiations and prevent German territorial losses to Poland. In December 1919, The Times called the contemporary reports of the events "greatly exaggerated", and the Pall Mall Gazette blamed the German Reich for "machinations" and the exaggerations. More accurate estimates from reliable sources, such as the Morgenthau Report or American diplomats in the Polish capital, emerged only later.

Figures for the death toll vary. According to William W. Hagen, citing a report prepared for the Polish Foreign Ministry, approximately 150 Jews were murdered and 500 Jewish shops and their businesses were ransacked. Police reports and subsequent investigations did not support that inflated estimate. According to an official police report based on hospital records, there were 44 deaths. The 1919 Morgenthau report counted 64 Jewish deaths. A simultaneous British government investigation led by Sir Stuart Samuel reported that 52 Jews were killed, 463 injured and a large amount of Jewish property was stolen. Jewish contemporary sources reported 73 deaths. It has been noted that the last Ukrainian soldier had left the city and the Jews offered no armed resistance.

Tadeusz Piotrowski claims that more Christians than Jews died, According to Norman Davies, 70 Jews and 270 more Ukrainians were killed in the fighting during this time as well. Historian Christoph Mick stated that not a single Ukrainian was murdered, whereas a Polish police report, discussed by Polish historian Zbigniew Zaporowski, included 11 Christians among the 44 victims (among the 11, one was listed as Greek Catholic, and therefore likely to be Ukrainian).

It was immediately after regarded as a pogrom per reports, including such as in The Nation and author Franciszek Salezy Krysiak who published his book in 1919. Though the Morgenthau Report raised a question as to whether the label "pogrom" is technically applicable to such riots in the times of war, the report submitted to Polish Foreign Ministry cited by Hagen characterized the incident as a pogrom, and it criticized the inaction of Polish officials in failing to halt the violence, while accusing the officials of publicizing inflammatory charges against Lwów's Jews. Historian David Engel noted that the Polish Foreign Ministry had conducted a campaign to discourage the use of the term "pogrom" by foreign investigators, although it used the term freely in its own investigation. Norman Davies questioned whether these circumstances can be accurately described as a "pogrom".

== See also ==
- Lwów pogrom (1914)
- Lviv pogroms (1941)
- Antisemitism in Ukraine
- Antisemitism in Poland
- History of the Jews in Ukraine
- History of the Jews in Poland
