= Controversies of the Polish–Soviet War =

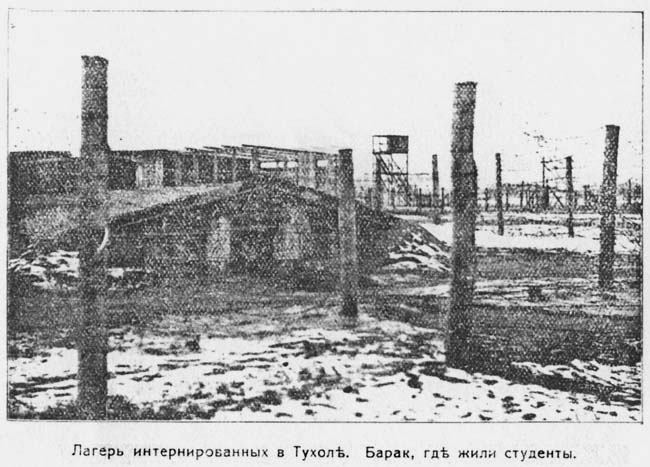
A photo of a barrack in Tuchola internment camp, published by a White Russian paper in Poland that claimed Tuchola was a "death camp". Many Russian POWs died in Poland as a result of poor conditions and communicable diseases.

Controversies of the Polish–Soviet War, fought in 1919–20, concerning the behaviour of the military forces and crimes they committed. Each side charged the other with violations of international law in an effort to sway public opinion in the West, which was felt to be important for both sides.

== Prisoners of war ==
The Polish–Soviet War was a war between two countries experiencing great socioeconomic difficulties, often unable to care for their own populations. During the war, the treatment of prisoners of war was far from adequate, with tens of thousands on both sides dying of communicable diseases. Between 16,000 and 20,000 of Soviet POWs – out of 80,000 – died in Polish camps; and about 20,000 – out of 51,000 – Polish POWs died in Soviet and Lithuanian camps. Russian professor Matveyev from Moscow National University pointed another numbers that within 60,000 up to 83,500 Russian POWs died in Polish prisoner camps out of 206,877 Soviet Russian POWs.

After 1922, Polish and Russian prisoners were exchanged between the two sides. Ekaterina Peshkova, the chairwoman of the organization Assistance to Political Prisoners (Pompolit, Помощь политическим заключенным, Помполит). was recognised by the Polish Red Cross for her participation in the exchange of POWs after the Polish-Soviet War.

== Atrocities ==
The Polish side claimed that during the Soviet retreat from Berdychiv, Kiev and Zhytomyr mass hostage-taking of civilians occurred, with hostages forced to go with the Red Army all the way to the rear of the front. Similar claims were made that when returning to Berdychiv the Bolsheviks threw out the sick and wounded from the hospital "disregarding the lives and honor of the medical personnel" and that in general the Soviet advance into Ukraine was characterized by mass killing of civilians and the burning of entire villages, especially by Budyonny's cossacks, designed to terrorise the Ukrainian population.

In January 1918, in Cichinicze near Mohylow, Bolsheviks shot patients and personnel of a Polish hospital.

Behind Polish lines, Soviet forces hanged suspected enemies on the spot. Ultimately, in the pacification of Ukraine that began during the Soviet counteroffensive in 1920 and which would not end until 1922, the Soviets would take tens of thousands of Ukrainian lives. On 7 June, the same day Budyonny's Cossacks, spreading terror in the rear of recently broken Polish frontlines, burned a hospital in Berdychiv, with 600 patients and International Red Cross nuns inside.

There were also accusations against Stanisław Bułak-Bałachowicz, a former officer of the Imperial Russian and Bolsheviks armies, who switched sides in the conflict and became a general in Poland. Although Bułak-Bałachowicz was regarded as a national hero to Belarusians in Poland for protecting them against Bolshevik terror, and his refusal to kill peasants on orders from Soviets, he is said to have behaved like an absolute ruler in the territories controlled by his troops, even conducting public executions. As one Polish officer wrote in a letter to his wife: "This is a person without ideology. The bandit and the murderer and his comrades – subordinates are just like that. They know no shame and are similar to barbarians. [...] I witnessed throwing the cut-off heads of Bolsheviks under his feet. [...] The massacre of Bolsheviks was horrific".

=== Pogroms ===
In 1919, Russian Jews were caught in the middle of a civil war, and became the victims of warring Red and White Russian, Ukrainian and Polish forces, among others, resulting in the loss of an estimated 100,000 Jewish lives. White Russian troops led by Denikin staged pogroms against Jews in practically every town he captured. In Ukraine at this time, under the leadership of Ukrainian nationalist Symon Petliura and the Ukrainian People's Republic, the mass murder of Jews took place on an unprecedented scale, second only to the Holocaust years of World War II.

Isaac Babel, a war correspondent embedded with the Red Army, in his 1920 diary wrote down many first-hand accounts of atrocities committed by both sides against Jews (Most of them were retreating Red Army in Ukrainian Front). On 5 April 1919 in Pinsk, Polish Major Aleksander Narbutt-Łuczyński, after hearing reports that Jewish inhabitants of the city were preparing to riot, panicked and ordered the execution of thirty-five Jews (Pinsk massacre). Similar hostilities, resulting in fewer casualties, took place in other towns. In Lida soldiers stopped several elderly Jews and cut off their beards with sabres and knives. During the pillage of Lida, Jewish homes were looted and 30 Jews were killed. Violence against Jews caused a major uproar and condemnation in the Polish Parliament. Ignacy Daszyński, leader of the Polish Socialist Party called all soldiers that committed acts of violence against the Jewish population "hooligans in uniform". However, Minister of War General Józef Leśniewski, in his written reply to the speaker of Parliament, defended anti-Jewish violence by Polish units in Lida, referring to Jews as a Communist-minded community and stating that the Polish Army had the right to kill their adversaries.

The scale of the massacres and abuse of Jewish victims at the hands of the Poles could not be equated with the massacres committed by Denikin's White troops.

However, reports of these incidents caused the United States to send a commission led by Henry Morgenthau, Sr. and Sir Stuart M. Samuel to investigate. According to the findings of this Anglo-American Investigating Commission, a total of about 300 Jews lost their lives in all incidents involving Poles. The commission also found that the Polish military and civil authorities did their best to prevent such incidents and their recurrence in the future. The Morgenthau report stated that some forms of discrimination against Jews was of political rather than anti-Semitic nature and specifically avoided use of the term "pogrom," noting that the term was used to apply to a wide range of excesses, and had no specific definition.

Sociologist Tadeusz Piotrowski noted that the Morgenthau Report admitted that the word "pogrom" was inapplicable to the conditions existing within a war zone. Richard C. Lukas argues that in some places, Jews had made themselves vulnerable by collaborating with Poland's Lithuanian and Soviet enemies.

== Property destruction ==
Both sides in the conflict raised complaints about property destruction in diplomatic notes addressed to the Entente. One note raised by the Soviet side stated that during the Soviet advance the retreating Poles engaged in "vengeful vandalism", as in Borisov where the Poles, following their retreat, shelled the city with artillery from the opposite bank of the Berezina River "killing hundreds of people and leaving thousands without shelter."

Another joint diplomatic note issued by Soviet Ukraine and Soviet Russia to the Entente blamed the Poles for heavily damaging Kiev, including its civilian infrastructure and art, such as St Volodymyr's Cathedral, a charge the Poles denied, admitting only to the destruction of the Kiev bridges, in order to slow down the Red Army. That particular note seems to be based on a telegram by Leon Trotsky, who later admitted that the information he received on St Volodymyr's Cathedral was incorrect.

Around the same time, two days after breaking through the Polish front line – Budyonny's 1st Army destroyed the bridges in Zhytomyr, wrecked the railway station and burned various buildings; Budyonny's troops would continue to spread terror and wreck infrastructure over the coming month in western Ukraine and eastern Poland, to delay the Polish army and disrupt its logistics.
