= Antisemitism in Poland =

During the 14th to 16th centuries, Jews in Poland enjoyed relative prosperity and tolerance, earning that period the nickname "Paradisus Judaeorum" (Jewish Paradise). However, the 17th century saw growing antisemitism, exacerbated by King Sigismund III's pro-Catholic policies and the violent Cossack Khmelnytsky Uprising, during which 100,000 Jews were killed. Over the next decades, Jewish communities in Poland faced mob violence, pogroms, and systematic restrictions. Despite these challenges, Poland remained a haven for Jews until the Third Partition of Poland in 1795.

In the 19th century, Russian imperial policies worsened Jewish-Polish relations, and anti-Jewish sentiments persisted even after Poland regained independence in the aftermath of World War I (for example, through restrictions on education, known as numerus clausus). During the Holocaust, while many Poles helped Jews, others persecuted them, most infamously in the 1941 Jedwabne pogrom. Anti-Jewish violence continued post-war, with another infamous pogrom occurring in Kielce in 1946. This trend culminated in the mass emigration of Jews forced to flee during the 1968 Communist purges.

After the fall of communism in 1989, Poland began openly addressing its history of antisemitism. Incidents, such as the 2006 attack on Poland's chief rabbi Michael Schudrich and the 2023 Hanukkah menorah extinguishing in parliament, highlight ongoing challenges.

== History ==
=== Middle Ages ===
During the Middle Ages, Poland was inhabited by a relatively small number of Jews. By the mid-14th century, they were present mainly in Silesia. The development of Jewish settlement in Poland accelerated in the later period, but their number was still not large in the middle of the 16th century and, according to Henryk Samsonowicz, amounted to about 20 thousand. They lived mainly in cities, in the territory of the Crown (excluding the Ukrainian lands incorporated after the Union of Lublin) the presence of Jews is documented in 294 cities out of a total of 1076. Jews settled mainly in Poland due to the persecution they suffered in Western Europe during the Crusades (12th century) and the Black Death (14th century). Polish rulers fostered this process by issuing a number of privileges for Jews, the first being the Statute of Kalisz of 1264 issued by Bolesław V the Chaste, later confirmed by King Casimir III the Great (in 1334, 1364 and 1367).

The accumulation of privileges granted by the Polish rulers led to the de facto separation of the Jews in Poland and Lithuania as a separate estate. Unlike in Western Europe, they had the status of guests and were subject to the protection of the prince or king. In return for paying a special tax, they had almost complete freedom of movement and choice of profession. Murder of Jews was subject to the same punishment as murder of a nobleman. The institution of the qahal, which did not exist outside of Poland, gave the Jews a large degree of self-government and took them out from under municipal law. The social status and political position of the Jews was much higher than that of the peasants who were serfs. The Jews themselves compared their position to the nobility, on whose lifestyle they modelled themselves. At the beginning of the 16th century, Jews living in noble private estates were taken out of the royal jurisdiction, this led to a further improvement in their situation as they were able to negotiate more favourable rights than those received from the king.

Jewish privileges were met with displeasure by the nobility and the Catholic clergy. The chronicler and clergyman Jan Długosz, writing in the second half of the 15th century, expressed the opinion that King Casimir III granted privileges to Jews at the request of his Jewish concubine Esterka; according to him, these privileges were "regarded by many as false, and in which there was no small harm and offense to God. These abominable endowments still exist to this day." Earlier, the Church had tried to limit Jewish freedoms by threatening excommunication for those Christians who interacted with Jews and ordering that Jewish settlements be separated from Christian ones. These principles, enacted by the two Lateran Councils of 1179 and 1215, were transplanted to Polish soil by the synods of 1267 and 1285. However, these provisions were never implemented in Poland.

=== Late modern period ===
Unlike in other European countries, in the Polish Commonwealth Jews continued to enjoy their special status achieved in the medieval era, as one of the estates of the realm. In the 16th century, as a result of persecution in the west, the number of Jews in Poland and Lithuania increased rapidly, reaching approx. 300,000 in 1600. While the kings and magnates of Poland tolerated the Jews as a useful source of revenues and services, the city burghers often saw them as competitors in trade and crafts. Hostility towards Jews was also widespread among peasants, especially when their lords had placed them under the supervision of Jewish bailiffs and leaseholders. The stereotype of the Jewish innkeeper profiting from the peasants' drunkenness and indebtedness was also very present in Polish folklore, popular mythology and literature.

In this period Jews began to settle outside the lands belonging to the king, mainly on the private estates of magnates. Under pressure from the nobility, King Sigismund I the Old agreed in 1539 to remove from his protection the Jews living in towns and private estates, who were now to be subject to the authority of the owners of these estates. Towns could obtain privileges limiting the number of houses belonging to Jews or the extent of their commercial activities, another type of privilege were those which explicitly forbade the settlement of Jews in a town. However, these prohibitions were often disregarded by establishing so-called Jewish towns, i.e. suburbs just outside the city walls. The Lutheran cities of Royal Prussia, led by Gdańsk, where the Jewish population remained very small compared to the rest of the country, were particularly strict about this.

While Jews were comparatively privileged compared to many other classes in the Commonwealth, and to the Jewish position in many other contemporary countries, their situation in the Commonwealth was hardly idyllic. From the middle of the 14th century to the end of the 15th century, there were 20 anti-Jewish riots on the territory of Poland and Lithuania; while from 1534 to 1717 there were 53. During that time, anti-Jewish sentiments were significantly related to Christian anti-Judaism, collectively blaming the Jews for the death of Jesus Christ. In some cases, Jews were taken to court on suspicion of host desecration and ritual murder libel. There are 17 documented accusations of the host desecration, 8 of which went to court, 3 cases ended in acquittal. In 1556, the first death sentence was passed in Sochaczew. The last investigation took place in Łubno in 1744. The first allegations of ritual murder by Jews were recorded in the chronicle of Jan Długosz. In 1547, the first trial of the case took place in Rawa Mazowiecka. By the middle of the 17th century, 62 such slanders and 28 trials were recorded. Thirteen cases resulted in executions and eight in acquittals. The highest number of slanders was recorded for the years 1590-1620 in central Poland (Mazovia, Kujawy and Podlasie), then they began to appear more frequently in the east, mainly in Ukraine. The last trial in the lands of the Commonwealth took place in 1786.

The status of the Jews was the subject of political debate at the Great Sejm (1788–1792). Along with the usual themes of anti-Jewish press, there were also some tendencies in favour of greater integration of Jews into Polish society, which, however, never went so far as to consider the possibility of their emancipation, such as that recently decreed by the National Assembly in 1791 revolutionary France. Scipione Piattoli spearheaded a plan for bold reforms to improve the condition of the Jews that ultimately failed in the face of strenuous opposition from the middle-class burgher estate.

=== Partitions of Poland ===
By the late 1700s, Polish Jews in 18th century Poland had begun to stand out in Central and Western Europe due to their unique cultural and social characteristics. Their living conditions were often more challenging and less dignified compared to others, yet they maintained a strong sense of community and identity. This was partly due to their larger population and tendency to live in close-knit, densely populated areas. These communities remained distinctly separate from the broader society, more so than their counterparts in other regions. It wasn't until well into the 1800s that a minority within this group started adopting local languages like Polish, Russian, or German. Many were literate in Hebrew, but an even larger number used Yiddish - a language with Germanic roots that they had brought with them to Poland - for reading, writing, and especially speaking.Their adherence to religious customs was generally stricter than that of their western counterparts. They showed greater deference to their religious leaders and tended to be more insular. These factors contributed to their perceived foreignness, which was further emphasized by their predominant presence in lower economic strata of society.

Klaus-Peter Friedrich traces the origin of modern Polish antisemitism, "based on ethnic and political prejudice and antagonism", to the period of late partitions of Poland period, particularly in the Russian governed territories. One example, Jacob Brafman's Kehila book, an early conspiracy theory claiming the existence of a secret network exercising power through Jewish qahal (outlawed in 1844), went through four Polish editions from 1874-1877. According to Friedrich, the situation worsened in the first half of the 20th century, during the periods of interwar Poland and World War II and "alienation grew when economic, social and psychological factors superseded traditional antijudaism". One of the key anti-Semitic activist of that time was journalist Jan Jeleński who argued (often in his magazine Rola) that Poland had to be defended from "Jewish influence", and that Jews unfairly dominated the economy and exploited the peasantry. His activities resulted in the creation of an "all-encompassing world view" of Polish antisemitism. Similar anti-semitic publications of that period included magazines Głos and the Przegląd Wszechpolski. Such antisemitic attitudes became popular in the conservative Christian political movement of National Democracy (known in Poland as endecja) which became a major force in Polish politics by the early 20th century. National Democracy associated Polishness with Roman Catholicism, and effectively failed to see Polish Jews as Polish people, and instead argued that Jews, whether assimilated or not, are harmful to the Polish society. Roman Dmowski, chief ideologue of the early endecja, declared around the turn of the century that "The Jewish population is undeniably a parasite on the social body of whichever country it inhabits".During this time, on the wave of anti-Jewish pogroms in the Russian Empire in 1881 and early 1900s, pogroms occurred in Warsaw (1881) and Bialystok (1906) in what is now Poland.

=== Second Polish Republic (1918–1939) ===
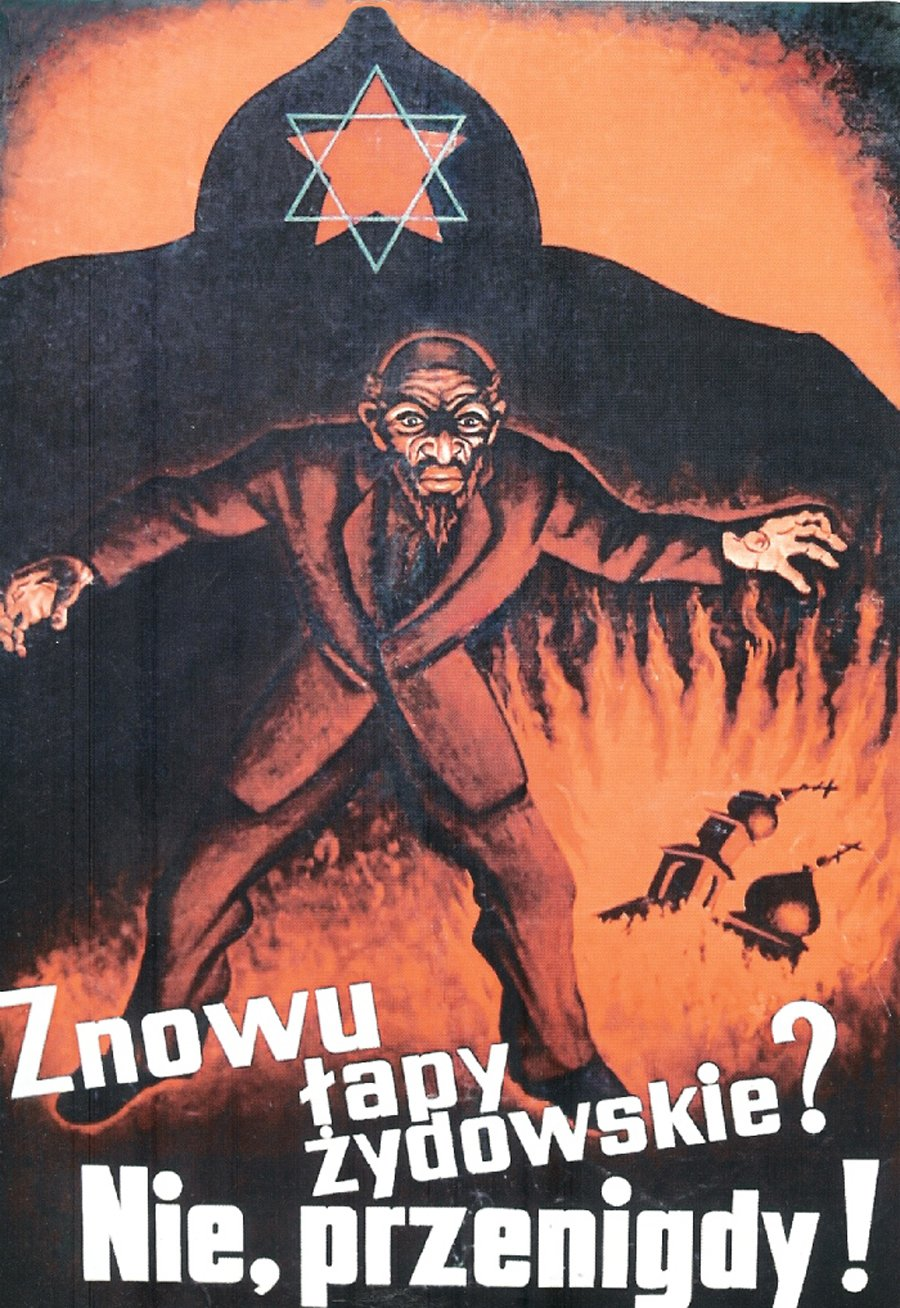
Antisemitic poster dated to the Polish–Soviet War of 1919–1921. The Red Star overlapping the Star of David alludes at the Jewish Bolshevism trope

In the Second Polish Republic that was established at the end of the First World War, Jews accounted for about 10 per cent of the state population and were one of the main components of the country after ethnic Poles (about 70 per cent) and Ukrainians (14 per cent). In 1939, Poland's 3.3 million Jews constituted by far the largest Jewish community in Europe, with 30% of the population in Warsaw and other major cities; in some parts of eastern Poland, Jews were the majority of the resident population. The Polish Jewish community was one of the most vibrant and free in Europe. Most of its members (85 percent) spoke Yiddish as their first language and the community was generally considered a national rather than a religious minority: a "nation within a nation", according to ethno-nationalists of the 19th and 20th centuries.

Antisemitism was widespread in political communication and had a strong grip on the deeply Catholic population imbued with feelings of religious anti-Judaism. Jews were accused of being an anti-national force, linked either to the German enemy or to Russian Bolshevism, and were subjected to harsh forms of discrimination. While the Polish Socialist Party was not antisemitic and maintained relations with the Jewish socialist movement, right-wing parties such as Roman Dmowski's National Democracy were a vehicle for antisemitic propaganda. They believed that most Jews were unassimilable and could never become Polish and that Jews were an anti-national force hostile to the Polish cause. Dmowski wrote that "in the character of this race [the Jews] so many different values, strange to our moral constitution and harmful to our life, have accumulated that assimilation with a larger number of Jews would destroy us, replacing with decadent elements those young creative foundations upon which we are building the future".

In the first decade of the second republic, hostility towards Jews by both the authorities and the population found expression in systematic discrimination and widespread antisemitic violence, such as the series of antisemitic outrages that followed the end of World War I, in the context of the Polish–Ukrainian War (1918-1919), in which between 350 and 500 Jews lost their lives. Lwów and other Galician cities were then the scene of pogroms perpetrated both by soldiers and civilians and in 1919 the wave of anti-Jewish violence spread to Polish-controlled Lithuania, hitting Lida, Vilna and Pinsk, where thirty-five Jews, including women and children, were executed by the army.

Also in 1920 the Polish army, allied with the anti-communist Ukrainian government of Symon Petliura, actively participated in the pogroms that targeted the Jewish communities in the course of the Polish–Soviet War. The war between Poland and Russia negatively affected Polish-Jewish relations especially in the ethnically mixed areas east of Poland's heartland, such as eastern Galicia and Lithuania. The Poles were angered by the desire of Jews to maintain a neutral position in the national conflict. Moreover, anti-communist propaganda sought to discredit the postwar revolutionary wave as a primarily Jewish phenomenon, since in Russia and Poland a significant part of the communist leadership was of Jewish origin, and some Jews had openly welcomed the October Revolution. The żydokomuna stereotype, "the new catchphrase of Poland's antisemites", emerged at that time.

The incidents in Pinsk, Vilna and Lwów aroused shock and indignation in Western Europe and the United States, and in May 1919 prompted the US president Woodrow Wilson to set up a commission, led by Henry Morgenthau, to investigate "alleged Polish pogroms" and the "treatment of the Jewish people" in Poland. The resulting Morgenthau Report, issued in October 1919, identified eight major incidents in the years 1918–1919 and estimated the number of victims at between 200 and 300 Jews, including the Lwów pogrom (1918). In Morgenthau's view, the antisemitic attacks were "the chauvinist reaction created by [Poland's] sudden acquisition of a long-coveted freedom" and the consequence of "a widespread anti-Semitic prejudice aggravated by the belief that the Jewish inhabitants were politically hostile to the Polish State".

In interwar Poland, the Jewish population was widely perceived as a complex issue by most political factions, though their approaches varied significantly. Left-leaning parties viewed the Jewish community's distinct cultural identity as problematic and advocated for integration into mainstream Polish society, similar to Western European models. Conversely, right-wing groups considered Jews fundamentally incompatible with Polish culture and potentially dangerous (see also Sanacja). These parties promoted various measures to marginalize the Jewish population, including economic discrimination, encouraging emigration, and in some cases, endorsing violent actions. A minority of liberal politicians, notably including the influential leader Józef Piłsudski, stood out by accepting Jewish citizens without demanding changes to their cultural practices or way of life. This stance, however, was not widely shared among the political elite of the time.

With the coup d'état of Piłsudski the situation of the Polish Jews improved and some concessions were made, such as the recognition of the cheder, the Jewish primary schools, but after the dictator's death, the birth of the Camp of National Unity resumed a conservative agenda full of anti-Jewish hatred.

Some subsequent major events in the life of Polish Jews, in the context of antisemitism in Poland, included:

- wave of anti-Jewish violence between 1935 and 1937 (ex. Przytyk pogrom)
- anti-Jewish quotas in schools and universities (Numerus clausus) and Ghetto benches
- right-wing National Party's economic boycott of the Jews
- nationalisation of industries in which Jews were predominant
- limitations to Jewish ritual slaughter
- proposal of making Madagascar a Polish colony where the Jews could be resettled (see Colonization attempts by Poland#Second Polish Republic)

When World War II broke out in 1939, the Polish government was actively considering its own version of the Nuremberg Laws.

=== Occupation of Poland (1939–1945) ===
The situation of Polish Jews worsened drastically following the German invasion of Poland. Germans engaged in the program of extermination of Jewry (The Holocaust), and enlisted the aid of collaborators, some of which were motivated by anti-Semitic attitudes. According to Antony Polonsky "The difficult problems raised by the Nazi Holocaust in Poland, and, above all, the vexed question of the Polish response to the mass-murder of the Jews have long been a sore point in Polish-Jewish relations"

One of the most infamous examples of this was the Jedwabne pogrom, a massacre of several hundred of Polish Jews in the town of Jedwabne, German-occupied Poland, on 10 July 1941. At least 40 ethnic Poles carried out the killing; their ringleaders decided on it beforehand with Germany's Gestapo, SS security police or SS intelligence, and they cooperated with German military police. Knowledge of the massacre did not become widespread until turn of the century, when it shocked Polish populace.

Polish main resistance, Home Army, had a mixed relation with the Jews. Some of its reports labelled groups of Jewish resistance as communist-affiliated, causing significant disruption to local Polish communities. One Home Army assessment from May 1943 discussed the prevailing attitudes among Poles. It suggested that there was a strong anti-Jewish sentiment within Polish society, to the extent that some appeared to condone German actions against Jews. The report indicated that fear of Soviet rule, towards which the Jews were seen as sympathetic, was a primary concern, second only to the prospect of continued German occupation. It implied that some Poles viewed the removal of the Jewish population as a means of combating communist influence.

Another Home Army report from December that year presented a detached perspective on the Jewish situation. It described the emergence of what it termed "Bolshevik and Jewish bands" in several areas around Lublin, and claimed that leaders of Jewish groups were actively seeking alignment with Bolshevik forces, promoting communist ideologies, and antagonizing local peasant communities through theft. This assessment reflected a focus on perceived communist threats rather than expressing concern for the plight of Jewish communities in the region.

=== Post-World War II Poland ===
Another infamous anti-Semitic incident happed shortly after the war. The Kielce pogrom was an outbreak of violence toward the Jewish community centre's gathering of refugees in the city of Kielce, Poland, on 4 July 1946. The pogrom was carried out by Poles; as a result 42 Jews were killed and more than 40 were wounded. This incident and several similar had a chilling effect on many Jewish survivors, encouraging them to leave Poland.

According to Jan T. Gross, Polish post-war Communist leadership adopted a stance that effectively distanced itself from Jewish concerns and issues. This approach aligned with a broader societal sentiment that sought to remove Jewish presence from the country entirely. As a result, the Communist authorities tacitly accepted the forceful expressions of anti-Semitic sentiment within society. This meant that there was little discussion of the Jewish-Polish relations, and little to no effort to investigate or hold accountable those who had participated in actions against Jews during the period of German occupation. The Communist regime effectively allowed these events to fade from official memory and scrutiny.

Gross further noted that enduring antisemitism in Poland after World War II was rooted in concrete wartime experiences rather than pre-existing attitudes or Nazi influence. During the occupation, some Poles found common ground with the German occupiers in their desire to dispossess Jews of their property and social positions. This opportunistic behavior created a material incentive for continued antisemitism after the war. As Jews who had survived the Holocaust attempted to reclaim their property and roles in society, many Poles perceived this as a threat to their newly acquired assets and status. The resulting postwar hostility towards Jews was thus driven by a desire to protect these gains and avoid confronting complicity in Nazi-instigated crimes.

Gross also referred to theory of Kazimierz Wyka, who "observed that it was Poland’s misfortune not to have had a Quisling-like government during the occupation. Consequently, Wyka quipped, anti-Semitism was never compromised in public opinion as an attribute of servile collaborationism with the Nazis".

=== People's Republic of Poland (1956–1989) ===
Friedrich notes that in the People's Republic of Poland, "the Jewish issue was time and again exploited in political machinations".

Another major incident occurred in 1968. The anti-Zionist campaign began in 1967, and was carried out in conjunction with the USSR's withdrawal of all diplomatic relations with Israel after the Six-Day War, but also involved a power struggle within the PZPR itself. The subsequent purges within the ruling party, led by Moczar and his faction, failed to topple Gomułka's government but resulted in an exile from Poland of thousands of communist individuals of Jewish ancestry, including professionals, party officials and secret police functionaries appointed by Joseph Stalin following the Second World War. In carefully staged public displays of support, factory workers across Poland were assembled to publicly denounce Zionism. At least 13,000 Poles of Jewish origin emigrated in 1968–72 as a result of being fired from their positions and various other forms of harassment.

== Post-1989 Poland ==
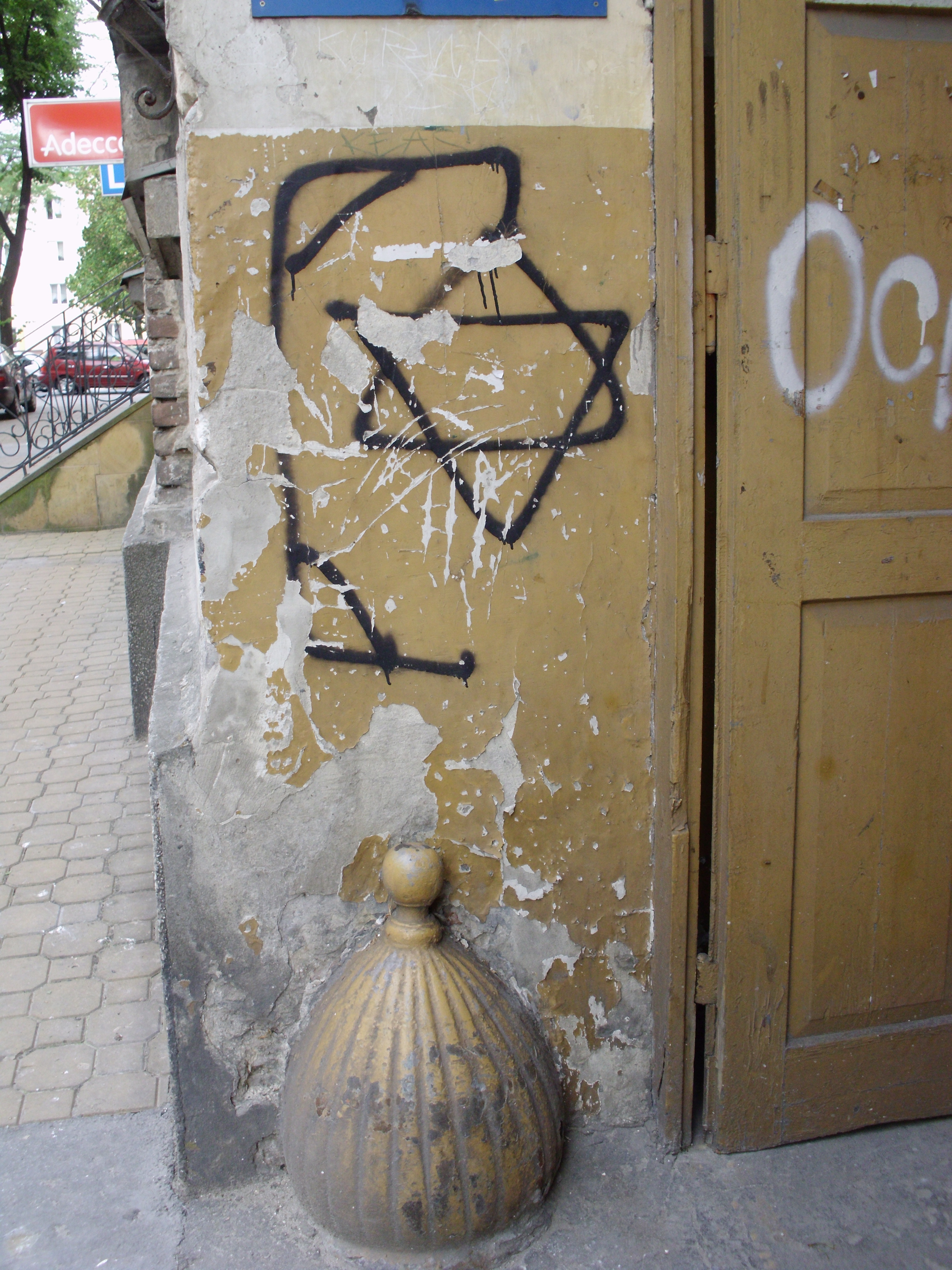
Antisemitic graffiti in Lublin depicting a Star of David hanging from gallows, c. 2012.

In modern Poland, Friedrich observes, antisemitism is related to an apologetic current often associated with the National Democratic ideology, which often attempts to minimize "excessively critical statements".

Sociologists Ireneusz Krzemiński and Helena Datner conducted survey research in 1992, 2002 and 2012 examining the prevalence of antisemitic and anti-antisemitic attitudes in Polish society. The latter were attributed to people who did not accept any antisemitic statements. The researchers examined the incidence of traditional antisemitism (referring primarily to Christian religious stereotypes, such as the accusation that Jesus Christ was murdered by Jews) and modern antisemitism (stereotypes referring to Jewish influence on the economy, media and politics). The research shows a general decline in traditional antisemitic prejudice, an increase in modern antisemitic attitudes in 2002 and a significant decline in 2012. There was a significant increase in the number of people without any antisemitic prejudice throughout the period.

Percentages of antisemites and anti-antisemites in the period 1992-2012
	1992	2002	2012
Modern antisemitism	17%	27%	20%
Traditional antisemitism	11,5%	11,6%	8%
Modern anti-antisemitism	8%	16%	21%
Traditional anti-antisemitism	29%	35%	45%

The research also showed a close correlation between education level and antisemitism, those with lower education, were more likely to declare antisemitic views, primarily when it comes to traditional antisemitism.

In 2019, the town of Pruchnik was condemned by the World Jewish Congress for doing the Burning of Judas.

== See also ==
- Judeopolonia

== Bibliography ==
- Bartoszewski, Władysław T., ed. (2004). Poles and Jews: perceptions and misperceptions. Polin. Studies in Polish Jewry, vol. 4. Oxford: Littman Library of Jewish Civilization. ISBN 978-1-909821-55-2. OCLC 761405337.
- Blobaum, Robert (2005). Antisemitism and its opponents in modern Poland. Ithaca: Cornell University Press. ISBN 0-8014-8969-5. OCLC 57557379.
- Cała, Alina (2012). Żyd - wróg odwieczny? Antysemityzm w Polsce i jego źródła (in Polish). Warsaw. OCLC 1080486354.
- Cała, Alina (2018). Jew. The Eternal Enemy? The History of Antisemitism in Poland. Polish Studies. Transdisciplinary Perspectives, Vol. 22. Peter Lang. ISBN 978-3-653-06331-8. OCLC 1080486354.
- Cichopek-Gajraj, Anna; Dynner, Glenn (2021-11-11). "Pogroms in Modern Poland, 1918–1946". Pogroms. Oxford University Press. pp. 193–218. doi:10.1093/oso/9780190060084.003.0010. ISBN 978-0-19-006008-4.
- Engel, David (1998). "Patterns Of Anti-Jewish Violence In Poland, 1944-1946". Yad Vashem Studies. 26: 43–85.
- Grabowski, Jan (2013). Hunt for the Jews: betrayal and murder in German-occupied Poland. Bloomington, Ind.: Indiana University Press. ISBN 978-0-253-01087-2. OCLC 868951735.
- Gross, Jan Tomasz (2006). Fear: Anti-semitism in Poland after Auschwitz. En essay in historical interpretation. New York: Random House. ISBN 978-0-307-43096-0. OCLC 320326507.
- Guldon, Zenon; Wijaczka, Jacek (1995). Procesy o mordy rytualne w Polsce w XVI-XVIII wieku [Ritual murder trials in Poland in the 16th-18th centuries] (in Polish).
- Hagen, William W. (1996). "Before the "Final Solution": Toward a Comparative Analysis of Political Anti-Semitism in Interwar Germany and Poland". The Journal of Modern History. 68 (2): 351–381. doi:10.1086/600769. JSTOR 2124667. S2CID 153790671.
- Hagen, William W. (2005). "The Moral Economy of Popular Violence". In Blobaum, R. (ed.). Antisemitism And Its Opponents in Modern Poland. Cornell University Press. pp. 124–148. ISBN 0-8014-4347-4.
- Hagen, William W. (2018). Anti-Jewish violence in Poland, 1914-1920. Cambridge: Cambridge University Press. ISBN 978-0-521-88492-1. OCLC 1005103174.
- Hundert, Gershon David (1997-10-01). "Poland: Paradisus Judaeorum". Journal of Jewish Studies. 48 (2): 335–348. doi:10.18647/2003/jjs-1997. ISSN 0022-2097.
- Hundert, Gershon David, ed. (1997). Jews in early modern Poland. Polin. Studies in Polish Jewry, vol. 10. London: Littman Library of Jewish Civilization. ISBN 978-1-909821-61-3. OCLC 646957619.
- Krzemiński, Ireneusz (2015). "Uwarunkowania i przemiany postaw antysemickich" [Determinants and transformations of antisemitic attitudes]. Żydzi - problem prawdziwego Polaka. Antysemityzm, ksenofobia i stereotypy narodowe po raz trzeci [Jews - the problem of the genuine Pole. Antisemitism, xenophobia and national stereotypes for the third time] (in Polish). Wydawnictwa Uniwersytetu Warszawskiego.
- Luzzatto Voghera, Gadi (2018). Antisemitismo (in Italian). Milano: Editrice Bibliografica. ISBN 978-88-9357-063-3. OCLC 1105200149.
- Mendelsohn, Ezra (1983). The Jews of East Central Europe between the World Wars. Indiana University Press. ISBN 9780253331601.
- Michlic, Joanna Beata (2008). Poland's Threatening Other: The Image of the Jew from 1880 to the Present. University of Nebraska Press. ISBN 978-0-8032-2079-9.
- Paulsson, Steven (2005a). "Poland (1918-1989)". In Levy, Richard S. (ed.). Antisemitism: a historical encyclopedia of prejudice and persecution. Santa Barbara, Calif.: ABC-CLIO. pp. 553–556. ISBN 1-85109-444-X. OCLC 60777788.
- Paulsson, Steven (2005b). "Poland since 1989". In Levy, Richard S. (ed.). Antisemitism: a historical encyclopedia of prejudice and persecution. Santa Barbara, Calif.: ABC-CLIO. p. 557. ISBN 1-85109-444-X. OCLC 60777788.
- Perry, Marvin; Schweitzer, Frederick M. (2002). Antisemitism: Myth and Hate from Antiquity to the Present. Palgrave Macmillan. doi:10.1007/978-1-349-38512-6. ISBN 9781403968937.
- Polonsky, Antony (2012). The Jews in Poland and Russia, vol. III, 1914 to 2008. Oxford: Littman Library of Jewish Civilization. ISBN 978-1-874774-64-8. OCLC 149092612.
- Polonsky, Antony (2018). "Polish-Jewsish relations and the Holocaust". In Polonsky, Antony; Węgrzynek, Hanna; Żbikowski, Andrzej (eds.). New directions in the history of the Jews in the Polish lands. Academic Studies Press and by the POLIN Museum of the History of Polish Jews. pp. 226–242. ISBN 978-83-949149-0-5. OCLC 1005199886.
- Polonsky, Antony; Węgrzynek, Hanna; Żbikowski, Andrzej, eds. (2018). New directions in the history of the Jews in the Polish lands. Academic Studies Press and by the POLIN Museum of the History of Polish Jews. ISBN 978-83-949149-0-5. OCLC 1005199886.
- Schatz, Jaff (1991). The generation : the rise and fall of the Jewish communists of Poland. Berkeley: University of California Press. ISBN 0-520-07136-0. OCLC 22984393.
- Schneider, Anna Sommer (2013). "The Catholic Church, Radio Maryja, and the Question of Antisemitism in Poland". Resurgent Antisemitism: Global Perspectives. Indiana University Press. pp. 236–266. ISBN 978-0-253-00878-7. JSTOR j.ctt16gzbgz.13.
- Stola, Dariusz (Spring 2003). "Jedwabne: Revisiting the Evidence and Nature of the Crime". Holocaust and Genocide Studies. 17 (1): 139–152. doi:10.1093/hgs/17.1.139. SSRN 2831412.
- Szuchta, Robert (2015). 1000 lat historii Żydów polskich. Podróż przez wieki [1000 Years of the History of the Polish Jews. A journey through the centuries] (in Polish). Warsaw.
- Vital, David (2001). A people apart: A political history of the Jews in Europe, 1789-1939. Oxford: Oxford University Press. ISBN 978-0-19-169762-3. OCLC 801846856.
- Zimmerman, Joshua D., ed. (2003). Contested memories: Poles and Jews during the Holocaust and its aftermath. New Brunswick, NJ: Rutgers University Press. ISBN 0-8135-3538-7. OCLC 54961680.
- Zimmerman, Joshua D. (2015). The Polish underground and the Jews, 1939-1945. Cambridge University Press. ISBN 978-1-316-31841-6. OCLC 910935082.
