= Lwów pogrom (1914) =

Russian-backed pogrom of Jews by Cossacks during World War One

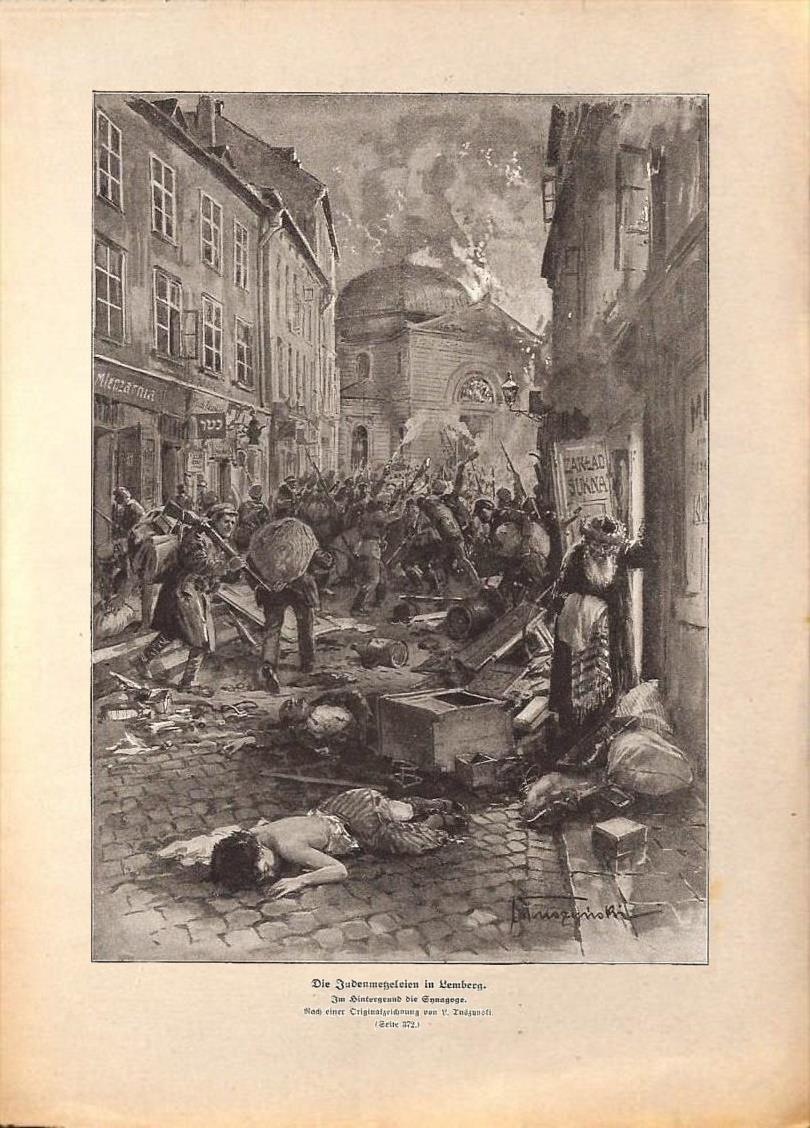
- Location: Lwów, Austria-Hungary (Austrian Poland)
- Date: September 27, 1914
- Deaths: up to 49
- Injuries: up to 47
- Victim: Jews
- Perpetrators: Russian soldiers, Cossacks

The Lwów pogrom (Polish: pogrom lwowski, German: Lemberger Pogrom) was a pogrom of the Jewish population of the city of Lwów that took place on September 27, 1914, during World War I. Following a reported robbery, or shots, involving the Imperial Russian Army in the Lviv's Jewish quarter, Russian Cossacks assaulted nearby Jewish civilians, resulting in about 40 civilian fatalities and a number of injuries. In the aftermath, no Cossacks were court-martialed, but several Jews were arrested and released shortly afterward.

Pogroms and persecution of Jews also took place in other Galician cities occupied by the Russian army.

== See also ==
- Lwów pogrom (1918)
- Lviv pogroms (1941)
