= Stanisław Jackowski (officer) =

- Born: 4 December 1881; Putyrol, Kursk Gubernia of Russia
- Died: 5 February 1929 (aged 47)
- Education: 1st Cadet Corps School in Petrograd, Kiev Polytechnic Institute
- Occupation(s): Military officer, engineer
- Years active: 1905–1921 (military)
- Known for: pioneer of armoured warfare
- Awards: Virtuti Militari, Polish Cross of Valour

Stanisław Jackowski (4 December 1881 – 5 February 1929) was an early pioneer of armoured warfare during the Polish-Soviet war of 1919–1921. He was the first ever Polish tank officer or crew member to be awarded the Virtuti Militari (Silver Cross-V No 3380). He became Commander of the II Battalion of the Polish 1st Tank Regiment.

== Early life ==
Jackowski was born 4 December 1881 in Putyrol in the Kursk Gubernia of Russia. He was educated at the 1st Cadet Corps School in Petrograd (St Petersburg). In 1898 shortly after leaving school he was in one of the first groups of students to enter the newly founded Kiev Polytechnic Institute of Emperor Alexander II. There he studied mechanical engineering. He briefly entered Russian military service in 1905 before joining the army reserve.

== Russian Army ==
With the commencement of the First World War in 1914 he was mobilised to participate in the campaign against Germany and Austria and was assigned as a staff officer to the headquarters of the XXIII Corps of the Imperial Russian Army. Later he was sent to the Nicholas Cavalry College in Petrograd where he underwent higher officer training. In 1916 he was sent to Main Artillery Control Headquarters and was made Commander of the 1st Artillery Squadron. In April 1917 following the end of the Tsar and appointment of a Russian Provisional government he became Chief of Engineers of the Russian XI Army and was sent to the South-West Front where he fought at the Kerensky Offensive, the last major Russian offensive of the First World War.

== Polish Army ==
In November 1917, he left the Russian Army and briefly became an officer into the Polish 1st Corp. After the Brest-Litovsk Peace Treaty and the subsequent dissolution of the Corps in May 1918 he made his way via Murmansk to France to join the emergent independent Polish Army (Haller's Army).

He joined the Polish 1st Tank Regiment (1 Pulk Czolgow) which was newly equipped with 120 of the small but relatively fast French Renault FT tanks. The 1st Tank Regiment consisted of four tank companies organised into two Battalions. After initial training on the new tanks, he first commenced as the Technical Adjutant to the I Battalion but shortly after on 18 December 1919 was promoted and took over Command of the 2nd Company from its previous French Commander, one Captain Dufour. In 1920, during the Polish-Soviet War, he was involved in a great deal of fierce fighting, particularly in the evacuation from Wilno and the Defense of Grodno. On 12 August 1920 he was promoted to Major and became Commander of the II Battalion of the 1st Tank Regiment, taking over from Captain Henryk Romiszowski. In 1921 he became the first ever Polish tank officer or crew member to receive the Virtuti Militari. The decoration "for outstanding bravery in combat" was awarded for his actions during and subsequent to the Defense of Grodno. He was wounded in action and later also received the Polish Cross of Valour.

With the formal ending of the Polish-Soviet war in 1921 he retired from his command of the II Battalion of the 1st Tank Regiment and recommenced in his career as an engineer being responsible for the building a number of bridges and other civil works. He died from a heart attack on 5 February 1929 at only 47 years of age.

== Decorations ==
- Silver Cross of the Order of Virtuti Militari
- Cross of Valour
- Order of St Stanislaus with swords
- Order of St Anna

== See also ==
- Polish-Soviet War
- The Renault FT
- First Battle of Grodno
- Virtuti Militari

== Sources ==
- Major Michal Piwoszczuk (1935) Zarys Histoji Wojennej 1-Go Pulku Czolgow. Warzawa
- (Polish) Witold Ławrynowicz (1 April 2002). "The Defense of Grodno. July 17 – 20, 1920"
- Tanks e-Magazine
- Wieczorkiewicz, Paweł Piotr (2001). Kampania 1939 roku. Warsaw: Krajowa Agencja Wydawnicza.
- The Order of the Virtuti Militari and It's Cavaliers 1792-1992 by Dr. Zdzislaw P. Wesolowski, Hallmark Press (1992) ISBN 0-937527-00-9
