= First Battle of Grodno (1920) =

Battle in the Polish-Soviet War

Battle of Grodno
- Part of the Polish–Soviet War
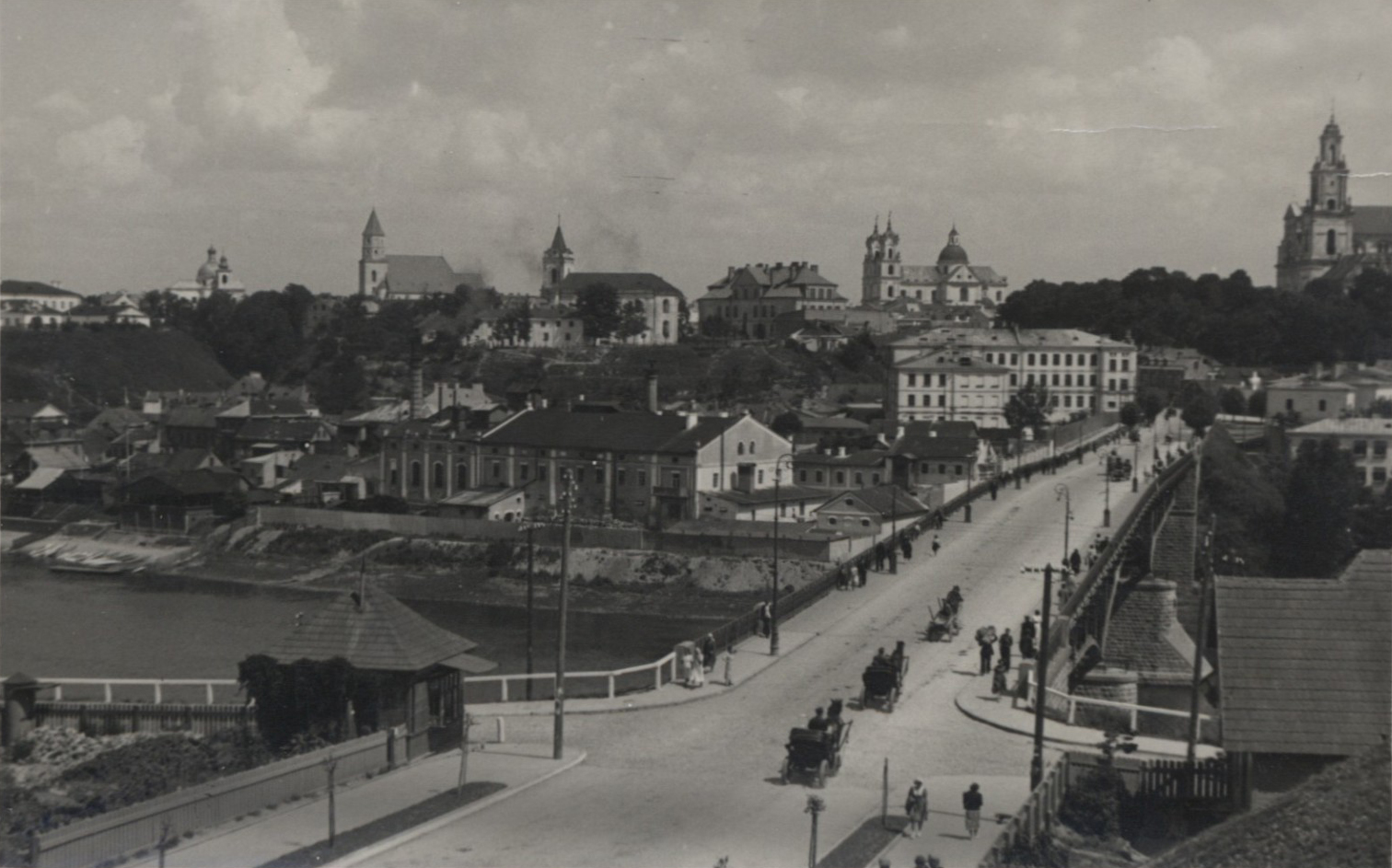
- Grodno as seen from across the road bridge, rebuilt in 1934
Date	19 – 20 July 1920
Location	Grodno, now in Belarus 53°40′N 23°50′E
Result	Soviet victory

Belligerents
Russian SFSR	Poland

Commanders and leaders
Hayk Bzhishkyan	Stefan Mokrzecki; A. Narbutt-Łuczyński; Stanislaw Jackowski

Units involved
3rd Cavalry Corps	elements of 9th Infantry Division and 1st Tank Regiment

Strength
	c. 3,000

Casualties and losses
500 killed, 400 horses wounded	

The First Battle of Grodno took place on 19 and 20 July 1920, during the Polish-Soviet War. In the effect of a three-day-long struggle for the control of the city of Grodno (modern Hrodna, Belarus), the town was captured by Russian forces, despite repeated counter-attacks by Polish infantry, tanks and armoured trains.

== Opposing forces ==
The Polish forces during the battle included an improvised group of battle-ready forces and second-echelon troops, with the most valuable unit being a single battalion of the 1st Tank Regiment (two companies, 43 FT-17 tanks in total). Infantry forces consisted of roughly 3000 men at arms. While officially they were all part of the 9th Infantry Division, hardly any were front-line troops. Instead, the Polish defences were manned by sentry guards, mobilised railway workers, students of a local NCO school and remnants of various units defeated near Wilno a couple of days before. Regular units included elements of 13th Uhlans Regiment.

Although the town had been fortified by Russians in the 19th century, the forts were in disrepair and did not provide much advantage to the defenders. Józef Piłsudski later noted in his memoirs, that "Grodno, called a fortress to praise military ears, is called a fortress only in our and Soviet books, where a place could be called a place d'armes even if it has no railroad, fortifications have no barbed wire, a hurricane-like barrage could come from a couple of broken guns and a fortress could have but a couple of blown-up forts".

The Russian forces assaulting the city were composed of Hayk Bzhishkyan's 3rd Cavalry Corps. Initially on 19 July only the 15th Cavalry Division took part in the assault. However, in later stages of the battle the entire 10th Cavalry Division joined the struggle, as well as 1st, 2nd and 3rd Kuban Cavalry Brigades and numerous infantry detachments travelling on horse-drawn carts. In the later part of the battle the Russian side was reinforced with additional forces, including the 12th Rifle Division.

== Prelude ==
Following the failure of the Kiev offensive, the Polish armies retreated westwards from central Belarus and Ukraine. Although the Bolshevik forces failed to surround or destroy the bulk of the Polish Army, most Polish units were in dire need of fresh reinforcements. However, following the successful retreat from the line of Berezina, the Polish commanders believed the situation in the northern sector of the front was under control.

Grodno was crucial to both sides as a crossing of the Neman River and a major rail hub along the Saint Petersburg–Warsaw Railway. Furthermore, after the loss of Wilno (modern Vilnius) on 14 July, the town was to be the axis of a new defence line, running from Lida along the Neman. In the area of Grodno two Polish divisions broke contact with the enemy and successfully withdrew to a 50 kilometre line of dilapidated fortifications surrounding the city. Additional forces were on their way from Wilno. While the forts had been destroyed in 1915 during World War I, the surrounding fortifications could still be of some use to the defenders. However, General Mokrzecki charged with organising the defence of the area did not issue any orders to the newly arrived 9th Infantry Division and did not prepare the defence of the city. His mistakes could not be corrected by his superior, General Gustaw Zygadłowicz, the commanding officer of the Polish First Army as he was stranded in an isolated village following his staff car's malfunction and lost contact with his troops for two days. Furthermore, on 18 July the Polish Cipher Bureau intercepted a Russian report claiming that the 3rd Cavalry Corps driving towards Grodno was exhausted and that its horses were in need of rest. The report was sent to Polish units in the area, and made them believe an assault on the city was highly unlikely.

== 19 July ==
Despite the earlier intelligence reports, the Russians attacked already in the early hours of the following day. The Russian attack broke through the Polish infantry after 8 hours of heavy fighting. Gen. Mokrzecki, having committed all his infantry reserves to the fight, ordered the 2nd tank platoon under 2nd Lt. Bohdan Jeżewski to counter-attack towards the village of Grandzicze, directly to the north of the town. The tanks drove through the city's streets and pushed the Russian cavalry out. After that the Polish tanks assumed defensive positions in a cemetery located right outside city limits. Later that day a second wave of Russian forces arrived, having routed two reserve squadrons of Polish cavalry operating to the east of Grodno. However, when the Russian 10th Cavalry Division charged towards the rail road circling the town from the east, they were fired upon by tanks of the 1st company, still loaded on flatcars and operating as an improvised armoured train. The Russian force was forced to retreat after suffering heavy losses.

Despite this initial success, the village of Stanisławów (at the north-eastern outskirts of the city) had to be abandoned soon afterwards, as the Russian 2nd and 3rd Cavalry Brigades gained entry to the city further west, near the suburb of Dziewiatówka. General Mokrzecki panicked, and ordered all Polish troops withdrawn from the eastern part of the town back to the city centre, to the vicinity of the train station and the bridges across Neman River. The approaching Russians however were not able to capture the bridges as both were blown up by Polish engineers around 19:30 hours, by then already under enemy fire. The loss of the train station and the bridges forced trains with additional Polish reinforcements from Podlasie to be diverted elsewhere, which further complicated the situation of the defenders.

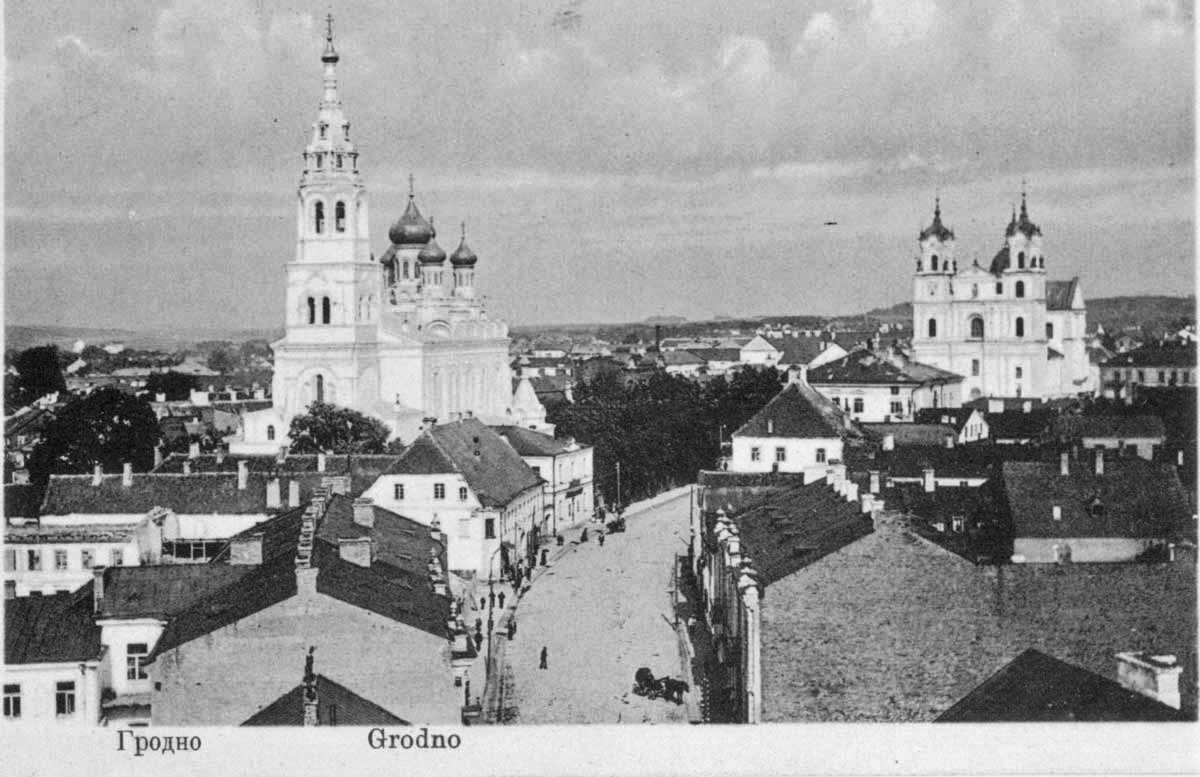
Downtown Grodno on a 1920 postcard

After the successful retreat to the south-western bank of the river, only the 3rd tank platoon of 2nd company and some isolated Polish infantry forces were left in the city. The company successfully sortied towards the village of Grandzicze north of Grodno, but returned to the cemetery it had been defending since noon. As the platoon did not have communication with other units, it was not informed of the general retreat across the river. In the evening Russian artillery came into range and started shelling the Polish position from the distance. Most of the town was already in Russian hands and around 18:00 the Cossacks of the 2nd Cavalry Brigade assaulted the isolated Polish position from the back, through the narrow streets of down-town Grodno.

Realising he had been cut off from friendly forces, 2nd Lt. Jeżewski ordered his forces to abandon the cemetery and break through towards the road bridge across the Neman. Despite heavy enemy fire, the tank platoon was still operational and did not lose any tanks, though only one was still in fighting condition. Two were down due to mechanical failures and had to be towed by other machines, two additional tanks were damaged, but with no loss of life. The tank unit was accompanied by 9 members of tank crews separated from other units and 25 soldiers of a sentry battalion who got separated from their commanding officer. The column started moving slowly towards friendly positions, with Russians trying to assault it from the sides in the narrow streets of the city centre.

To help with the break-through, the 1st platoon, 1st company under Lt. Glowacki was ordered to cross the bridge once again and head towards the city centre. It did not find the isolated Polish unit and retreated back across the river. Envoys were also dispatched on foot to look for the lost detachment and eventually found the 3rd tank platoon. After two hours of constant fighting, the unit reached the last intact bridge across the Neman, at that time already set on fire. Only two tanks managed to cross the burning bridge, the rest had to be abandoned.

== 20 July ==
Despite losing the bridges, the Russian forces crossed the river overnight in several locations to the north of Grodno. To reinforce the defence of the south-western bank of Neman the XVIII Infantry Brigade (part of 9th Infantry Division) under Col. Aleksander Narbutt-Łuczyński was sent to the battlefield. It was to attack north, along the western bank of the river, and eliminate the Russian bridgeheads. By the time the Polish assault started, the Russians already were well-entrenched. Although initially the Polish brigade managed to push the Russian forces back to the line of 19th century Russian forts west of the city, the attack ultimately failed. The day's fighting resulted in a stalemate.

The following day the Polish tanks withdrew further south-west and took part in a skirmish around the village of Wielka Olszanka, some 4 kilometres (2.5 mi) from the town, again using part of the tanks as an improvised armoured train. The assault on Russian positions manning the Hill 177 and an old Russian fort No. 5 was successful and the Russians retreated towards the river, chased by Polish tanks and infantry. This temporary success did not however force the Russians out of the close side of the river and in the following days Hayk Bzhishkyan's 3rd Cavalry Corps crossed the river further north and restarted its march south-westwards, along the Grodno-Sokółka railway. The Polish force fought numerous delaying battles, but in the end had to retreat to Sokółka. The 2nd company was then withdrawn from the front and sent to Łódź for repairs. The 1st company remained on the front and shared the fate of the XVIII Brigade, that eventually retreated towards Warsaw and took part in the fighting along the Narew during the Battle of Warsaw in mid-August.

In his memoir, Hayk Bzhishkyan recalled that the fights for Grodno cost him "500 killed and wounded, 400 horses and seven days of priceless time". Polish losses remain unknown.

== Outcome ==
The battle ended in a defeat for the Polish forces. The line of defence running along the Neman and Szczara had to be abandoned and the Polish forces attempted to withdraw and defend Narew and Bug River lines. The defence proved equally unsuccessful and it was not until mid-August when the Poles could stop the Russian Army in the Battle of Warsaw.

Several post-war authors called the Polish defence of Grodno on 19 July "mediocre at best", and argued that the officers suffered from a "psychosis of disaster and retreat". Indeed on 23 July 1920, Gen. Gustaw Zygadłowicz, commander of the 1st Army was relieved of command and replaced with Gen. Jan Romer.
