= Polish prisoners and internees in Soviet Russia and Lithuania (1919–1921) =

Polish prisoners of war and internees in Soviet Russia and Lithuania — Polish soldiers and citizens who were captured and interned during the Polish–Soviet War and remained in the custody of Soviet and Lithuanian authorities. Their condition is one of the less researched controversies of that period.

== Background ==
Most Polish POW's were captured after the capitulation of the 5th Division on 11 January 1920 at Ujar train station as well as during the Soviet offensive in the early August.

Only a few Polish POW's were captured in other engagements, as the Soviet offensive terminated with the Battle of Warsaw. Even fewer Polish POW's were taken from many tiny Polish military units participating in the Russian Civil War.

After the capitulation of the 5th Division, the Soviet administration, disregarding a treaty signed with Poland, imprisoned the Polish POW's, and subsequently decided to treat them as guilty of crimes against the Soviet state.

== POWs ==
Some POWs, primarily officers were executed, others were sentenced to serve time in jail, and the rest of the Polish soldiers were pressed to serve as forced labour (katorga) in the so-called Yenisey Brigade. The prisoners had no access to medical care or medication. Their daily food rations were made of half a pound of bread and watery soup. Moreover, the guards were robbing the prisoners, in some instances even taking their clothing. The spread of diseases (like typhoid) contributed to the high mortality rate.

While the conditions for Soviet prisoners were clearly exposed in the Polish press, no corresponding fact-finding about Soviet camps for Polish POWs could be expected from tightly controlled Soviet press. Available data shows many cases of mistreatment of Polish prisoners. There have been also cases of Soviet army executing Polish POWs when no POW facilities were available.

While majority of Polish POWs were held by the Soviet Union, several thousand of them were held by the government of Lithuania - soldiers captured during the Polish-Lithuanian War, Żeligowski's Uprising or interned during the Polish-Soviet War (Lithuania was sympathetic to the Soviet side; see Soviet–Lithuanian Treaty for further details). Cases of mistreatment of Polish POWs in Lithuania were frequent and similar to situation in Soviet camps.

About 20,000 out of about 51,000 Polish POWs died in Soviet and Lithuanian camps A similar number of Soviet POWs - from 16,000 to 20,000 out of 80,000 - perished due to disease and poor conditions in Polish camps in that period.

Poland and the Soviet Union exchanged prisoners after the Peace Treaty in Riga was signed in late 1920. The POW exchange process begun in March 1921, with most POWs being transferred by May 1922.

== See also ==
- Camps for Russian prisoners and internees in Poland (1919–1924)
- Camps for soldiers of the UNR Army interned in Poland (1919–1924)
- Polish prisoners of war in the Soviet Union after 1939
