= Aleksander Narbutt-Łuczyński =

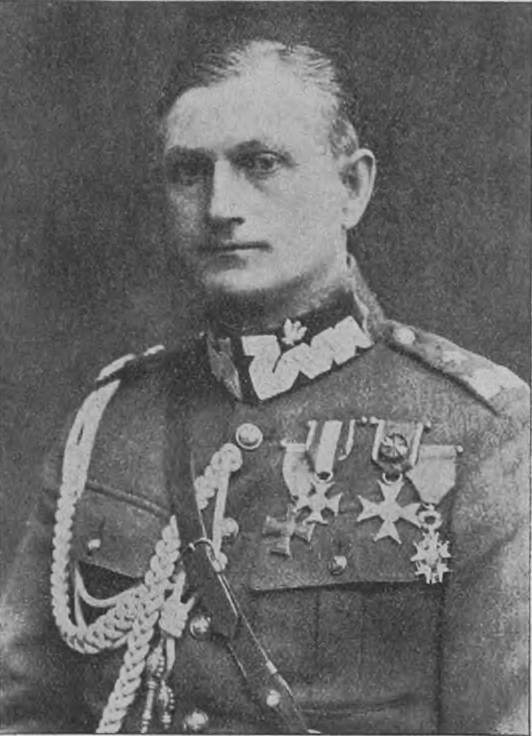
- Born: February 28, 1890; Skierniewice, Poland
- Died: July 25, 1977 (aged 87); New Britain, Connecticut, United States
- Military career
- Allegiance: Poland
- Rank: Brigadier General
- Conflicts: World War I Polish–Soviet War; World War II
- Awards: Order of Virtuti Militari; Cross of Independence; Cross of Valour (4 times)

Aleksander Narbutt-Łuczyński (February 28, 1890 – July 25, 1977) was a Polish lawyer and military officer, a brigadier general of the Polish Army and a veteran of both the Polish-Bolshevik War and World War II. During the German-Soviet invasion of Poland in 1939 he commanded the rear troops of the Kraków Army.

Łuczyński gave the orders for the Pinsk massacre, in which 35 Jewish civilians were killed.

== Life ==
Born to Michał and Maria Łuczyński in Skierniewice, then a county town in the Warsaw Governorate he graduated from the faculty of philosophy of the Lwów University. After that he moved to Belgium, where he graduated from the faculty of law of the University of Liège. After the outbreak of World War I he returned to Poland under foreign partitions and volunteered for the Polish Legions in Austria-Hungary. In October 1914 he was promoted to the rank of Lieutenant, and then in March of the following year - to Captain.

After Poland regained independence in 1918 Narbutt-Łuczyński joined the newly formed Polish Army, and took part in the Polish-Bolshevik War in the rank of Major, and then Colonel (since June 1, 1919). After the war he remained in the army and in 1924 was promoted to brigadier general. He served on various command posts in the interbellum. During the Invasion of Poland, Narbutt-Łuczyński commanded the rear troops of the Kraków Army. Taken prisoner of war in Romania, he made his way to France, where he remained in the officers' reserve of the commander-in-chief. After the end of World War II, he settled in the United States, where he lived until his death.

== Pinsk massacre ==
During the Polish-Soviet War, Major Łuczyński was a commanding officer of Polish troops in the frontline city of Pinsk, whose population was overwhelmingly Jewish. On April 5, 1919, after receiving numerous reports about planned attacks on the Polish army, and even on him personally, he gave the orders for what became known later as the Pinsk massacre, where 35 local Jewish members were executed without trial one hour after being arrested and falsely accused of being Bolshevik plotters. The Jews, attending a local meeting that includes a number of leaders of the local Jewish community, were meeting to discuss distribution of financial and food relief, including aid for Passover. Narbutt-Łuczyński, however, interpreted the meeting as a gathering of subversives planning a rebellion. The incident gained notoriety in the United States. An investigation into the massacre was called by President of the United States Woodrow Wilson. Henry Morgenthau Sr., at the time a senior adviser, and formerly the U.S. ambassador to the Ottoman Empire, was appointed to head the investigation. According to William W. Hagen Łuczyński "embodied military anti-Jewish paranoia, discovering in trivia malevolent design and finding himself in a numerous throng of unfriendly foreign-speaking Jews, high fearful of ambush."

== Honours and awards ==
- Silver Cross of the Virtuti Militari
- Cross of Independence
- Officer's Cross of the Order of Polonia Restituta
- Cross of Valour - four times
- Gold Cross of Merit - twice
- Officer's "Parasol" badge
