= Tuchola prisoner of war camp =

Coordinates: 53.575284°N 17.876722°E

- 1914 – 1921
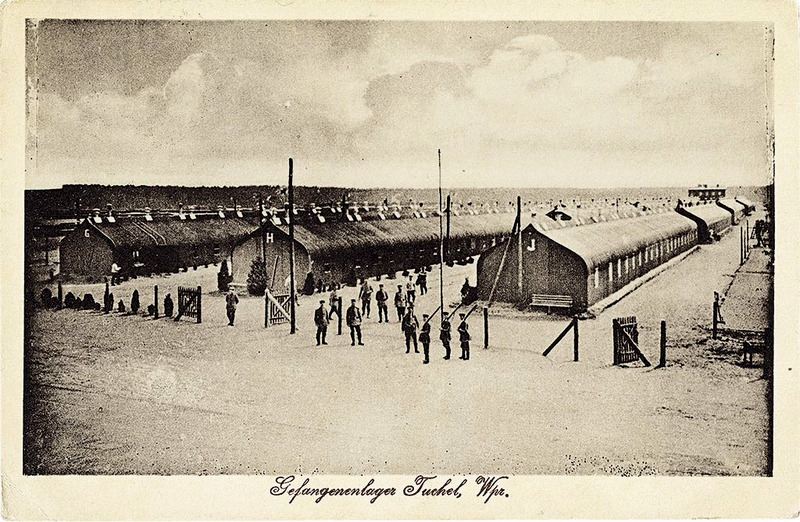
- Tuchola prisoner of war camp during World War I

The Tuchola prisoner of war camp, located in the town of Tuchola (Tuchel, Тухоля), was a prisoner-of-war camp built and operated by the German Empire from 1914 until 1918 and then by the Second Polish Republic from 1920 until 1921.

== German prisoner of war camp ==
The camp was constructed at the beginning of World War I by the Germans. Initially the German military command believed that the war would last no more than a few weeks and even if the campaign in the west lasted longer, the expectation was that the Russians would not be able to mobilize large forces for some time. However the Russian Empire began an offensive in Eastern Prussia soon after the commencement of hostilities and the German army was forced to relocate substantial forces to the east. After crucial strategic mistakes by Russian generals at the Battle of Tannenberg and the First Battle of the Masurian Lakes, the Germans, after these victories, found themselves with a substantial number of captured Russian soldiers, around 137,000 prisoners. Without a prior plan to accommodate this many captives the Germans began hastily building the facilities to house them, most of which were located in Gdańsk Pomerania, including Tuchola.

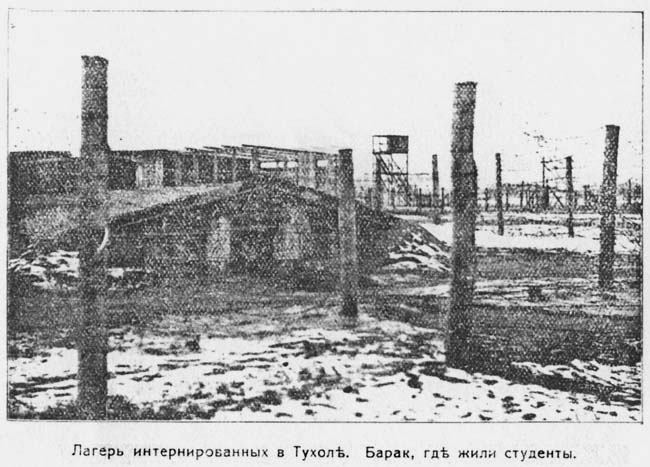
Camp in dilapidated state in 1919 after German withdrawal

The camp itself was constructed using labor from captured Russian prisoners of war. In addition to Russians, after Romania joined the Entente side in 1916, the camp also held Romanians, as well as a few soldiers of the Western Entente countries. In all of Gdańsk Pomerania there were from twenty to twenty five thousand Romanian soldiers held captive. In Tuchola in particular, their fate was quite tragic and they accounted for most of the fatalities in the camp.

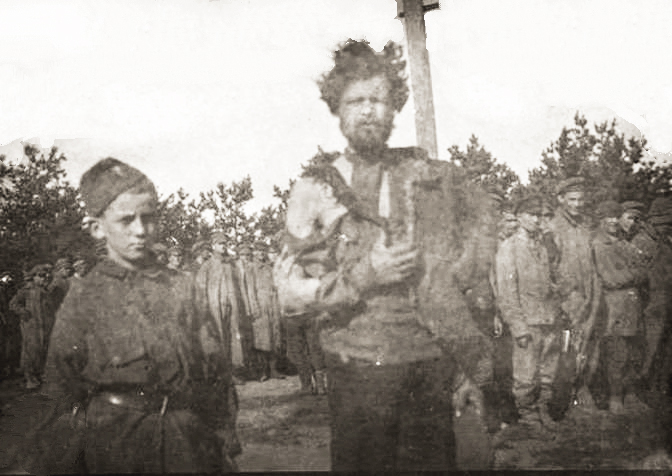
An unknown Russian POW in the Tuchola camp in 1919

Due to the spread of infectious diseases, during the period of World War I, 3760 prisoners died in the camp. Of these 2471 were Romanians (most of these deaths occurred in 1917) and 1289 were Russians (the majority of deaths occurred in 1915 although these were more spread out than those of the Romanians). At the beginning of 1918 Polish prisoners were also held in the camp.

After the signing of the Treaty of Brest-Litovsk between Germany and the Soviet Union, Russian prisoners began to be released. However, because the German authorities wished to use them for forced labor for as long as possible, only few were initially allowed to leave the camp and a mass departure of Russian POWs did not take place until the German capitulation and the collapse of the German empire, after November 1918. After the Germans abandoned the camp the facilities and infrastructure deteriorated, particularly the living quarters. Some of the released Russian soldiers elected to stay in what became the newly reconstituted Poland, finding work in local agriculture or intermarrying with the local population.

== Polish prisoner of war camp ==
The region around Tuchola became part of the newly independent Poland in 1920. Due to the degraded state of the camp only a portion of it was deemed as usable. Reconstruction and improvement work began in March 1920. Polish authorities opened the camp again in May 1920, with the first prisoners consisting of members of the Ukrainian Galician Army, who had been captured during the Polish–Ukrainian War and in the Kiev offensive. Most of the Ukrainian prisoners were released from Tuchola by the end of 1920.

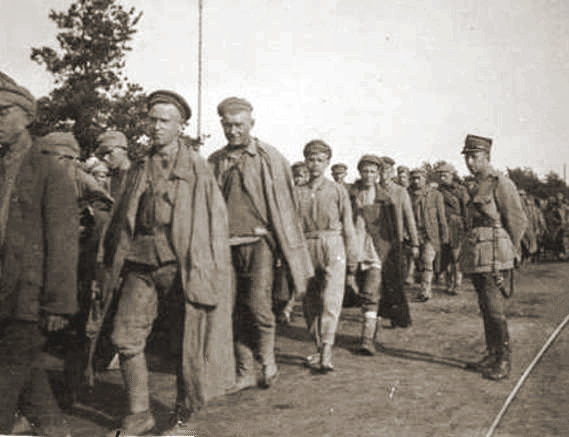
A column of Russian POWs after the Battle of Warsaw.

As early as May 26, 1920 there were six cases of typhus recorded. However, until the fall of 1920 the general health conditions in the camp were fairly good. This was because the continuing release of the Ukrainian prisoners resulted in absence of overcrowding, and also due to the fact that the Ukrainian Galician Army had highly competent medical personnel with them. One of the prisoners held in the camp was general Myron Tarnavsky who was arrested in July 1920, and released from the camp in December 1920. The Polish prime minister Wincenty Witos visited the camp in October to meet Tarnavsky.

Beginning in September 1920, and until October 1921, the camp also housed Red Army POWs captured during the Polish-Soviet War, especially after the Polish victory in the Battle of Warsaw. The presence of the large number of new prisoners resulted in severe overcrowding and unsanitary conditions. Immediately after the arrival of the Russian prisoners, epidemics of cholera, dysentery, flu, tuberculosis and various forms of typhus broke out. In January 1921 more than 560 prisoners died in the camp. Subsequently, conditions in the camp improved dramatically. At its peak, in March 1921, the camp held 11,000 Red Army prisoners.

Between September and November 1920, almost three thousand of the Russian POWs volunteered to switch sides and join Polish or Polish-allied units. 2742 were released and joined the forces of the anti-Bolshevik Belarusian general Stanisław Bułak-Bałachowicz, while 182 joined with the Polish allied Ukrainian forces of Symon Petliura.

During the period that the camp was controlled by the Second Polish Republic, up to two thousand Russian prisoners died due to hunger, bad living conditions, and infectious diseases.

Deaths of Bolshevik POWs in Tuchola
Time period	Deaths
August 30 - November 2, 1920	437
November 3–30, 1920	296
December 1–30, 1920	333
January 1–31, 1921	561
February 1–28, 1921	157
March 1–31, 1921	64
April 1–30, 1921	19
Total	1867

== Internment camp ==
After the end of the Polish-Soviet war the camp served as an internment center for those Russian soldiers who elected to stay in Poland, as well as the Russian, Belarusian and Ukrainian who fought in Polish-allied formations during the war. During this period, from September 1921 to November 1922 (none after July), there were a total of 55 deaths in the camp. While in many respects, due to overcrowding, the conditions in the camp were substandard, the interned enjoyed a significant amount of autonomy. The camp was officially put under civilian administration in November 1921. The Polish Ministry of the Interior was put in charge in April 1922 and between then and November almost all the interned were released and transferred to regular civilian life in Poland.

== See also ==
- World War I prisoners of war in Germany
- Camps for Russian prisoners and internees in Poland (1919–1924)
- Camps for soldiers of the UNR Army interned in Poland (1919–1924)
