= Independent Cossack Brigade (Poland) =

1920 Cossack brigade in the Polish army

The Independent Cossack Brigade (pol - Samodzielna Brygada Kozacka, rus - Отдельная Казачья бригада) was a cossack brigade in the Polish army fighting against Red Army during the Polish-Soviet War.

== Background ==
During World War I, many cossacks server in the Russian Imperial Army, mostly as cavalry divisions. After the German victory on the Eastern Front the cossacks continued fighting in the Russian Civil War, serving the Don Republic and South Russia.

In December 1918, envoy of the Don Republic, Alexander Cheriachukin arrived in Warsaw, but no deal has been made. After that, in 1920 another possible cossack ally has emerged, the Kuban Cossacks, which looked for Polish and Entente support against the Bolsheviks. But the negotiations stopped after the forces of Anton Denikin captured Ekaterinodar, leading to the Kuban Cossacks believing in his road to victory.

== Formation ==
In the spring of 1920, Wadim S. Jakowlew, coming from the Georgian Democratic Republic arrived in Warsaw in order to talk about the creation of cossack units in the polish army. He supported his idea by claiming that those units would be a great propaganda tool against the bolsheviks, showing the bolshevik-aligned cossacks that there are defectors joining the Polish anti-communist forces. The Polish government agreed, and started preparing three cossack cavalry regiments: Terek, Don and Kuban cossack regiments. After that they created two cossack brigades: Kuban and Don brigades, which both were made up of two cavalry regiments and an artillery division. There was also a cossack brigade, made up of 750 soldiers led by Wadim S. Jakowlew, the father of the cossack brigades.

Salnikov Alexander Ivanovich, a Don Cossack commander would become the leader of the Independent Don Cossack Brigade in Poland, which would take part in the Polish-Soviet War

== Activities in Poland ==
The various cossack units actively fought in many battles and offensives of the Polish-Soviet War, such as: The March on Bracław, Kiev Offensive (1920), Battle of Komarów, Defense of Zamość.

The effectiveness of the units was disputed, although they have been proved successful in some of their operations, their propaganda effect was not too influential on the cossacks fighting for the bolsheviks, because of polish soldiers reparative cases of executing prisoners of war and defectors, with Kazimierz Świtalski saying:

"The Cossacks surrender willingly. They want to be sent back to Wrangel. The obstacle to demoralizing the Bolshevik army through desertions on our side is made more difficult by the fierce and ruthless slaughter of prisoners by our soldiers, especially in the north."
