= Camps for Russian prisoners and internees in Poland (1919–1924) =

Prisoner of War camps in Poland during World War I

Russian POW camps in Poland
- 1919–1924
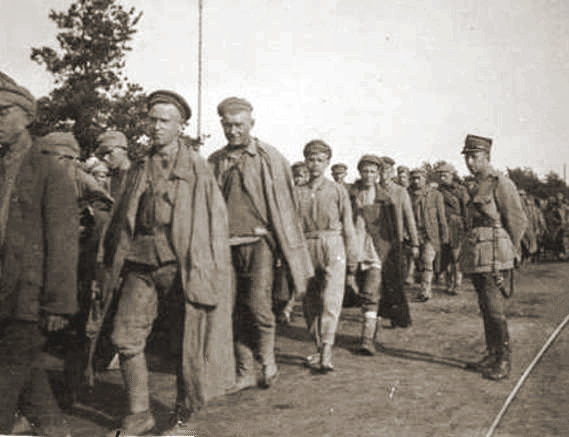
- 1920- Russian POWs walking to Rembertów

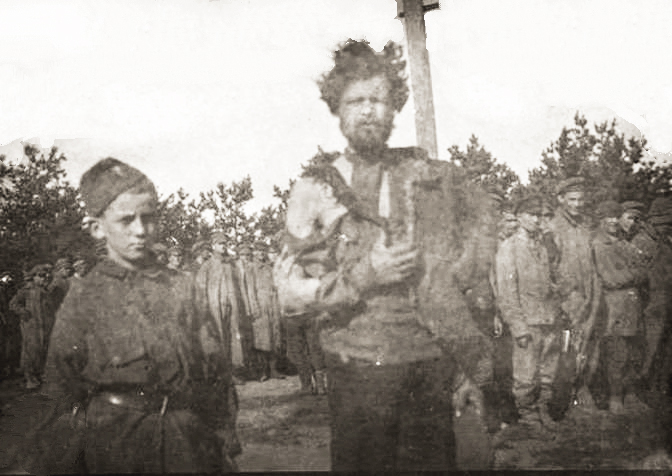
- 1920- Russian POW with Polish youth soldier (left) at the Tuchola prisoner of war camp

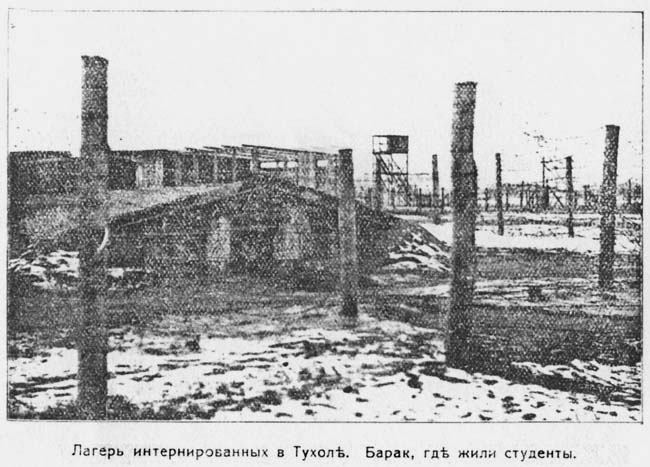
- Tuchola prisoner of war camp in dilapidated state after the German withdrawal in 1919

Camps for Russian prisoners and internees in Poland that existed during 1919–1924 housed two main categories of detainees: the personnel of the Imperial Russian Army and civilians, captured by Germany during World War I and left on Polish territory after the end of the war; and the Soviet military personnel captured during the Polish–Soviet War, the vast majority of them captured as a result of the battles of 1920. Locations of the camps included Strzałkowo, Pikulice, Wadowice, and Tuchola.

Due to epidemics raging at the time, made worse by the very bad sanitary conditions in which the prisoners were held, largely due to overcrowding, between 16,000 and 20,000 Soviet soldiers held in the Polish POW camps died, out of the total of 80,000 to 85,000 prisoners.

== Background ==
During the Polish-Soviet War, between 80,000 and 85,000 Soviet soldiers became prisoners of war, and were held in Polish POW camps. The conditions in these camps were bad, as the newly recreated Polish state lacked many basic capabilities and had few resources to construct them. Thus, the existing camps, many of which were adapted from World War I German and Russian facilities or constructed by the prisoners themselves, were not adequate for holding the large number of prisoners, who suffered from hunger, bad sanitation and inadequate hygiene. Between 16,000 and 17,000 (Polish figures) and 18,000-20,000 (Russian figures) of the Soviet POWs died, in the vast majority of cases as a result of illness or epidemics which raged in the camps. Before publications of new findings in Russia in 2004, some Russian sources gave much-inflated numbers for prisoners and the death toll (up to 165,000 and 70,000), respectively. This matter caused much controversy between Poland and Russia.

== The camps ==
The bad conditions in these camps were known to public opinion in Poland at the time, as a number of Polish newspapers openly wrote about them, criticizing the government for not correcting the situation. In modern times the issue has been addressed in a number of scholarly publications.

== The controversy ==
The issue of the actual number of prisoners and their estimated death toll was a source of controversy for a long time until a joint team of Polish and Russian historians reexamined documents from both Polish and Russian archives in 2004. The commission included Waldemar Rezmer and Zbigniew Karpus from Nicolaus Copernicus University in Toruń as well as Gennady Matveyev from the Moscow State University. It was estimated by Karpus and Rezmer that the number of Russian POWs was near 110,000 and at least 157,000 by Matveyev. The number of deaths in the camps was estimated between 16,000 and 17,000 (Karpus, Rezmer) and 18,000–20,000 (Matveyev). Conditions in camps were harsh, and the primary causes of death were epidemics of influenza, typhus, cholera and dysentery.

Until the source documents were published in Moscow in 2004, some Russian historians had estimated the number of prisoners and the death toll to be much higher, estimating that the death toll ranged from 40,000 to more than 100,000. For example, Irina Mikhutina in her 1995 publications estimated the number of prisoners to be 165,000 and the death toll to be 70,000. In 1998 Russian popular press reported that Polish internment camp in Tuchola was particularly notorious for the large number of Soviet POW's deaths and was dubbed a "death camp" by the Russian Emigrant press from within Poland. There have also been accusations from the Russian side that the death toll was influenced by the indifference of the camp authorities. Others accused the Russian side of using these numbers to justify the Katyn massacre, the mass executions of Polish officers and intelligentsia in World War II. Such usage has become known as "Anti-Katyn".

The Russian historians arrived at this number by first estimating the number of POWs, then subtracting the number that has been repatriated to the Soviet Union after the hostilities ended, and then assuming that most of the remainder died in POW camps. Polish historians always countered this by arguing that: (a) the number of POWs was very difficult to estimate accurately, due to the chaotic situation prevailing for most of the war, and (b) many Soviet POWs lost that status after they switched sides and entered units fighting alongside Polish forces against the Red Army, or were transferred to the Whites rather than the Bolsheviks. There was also the problem that significant number of Russian POWs were left in the territory of Poland since World War I (about 2,420,000 soldiers of the Russian Empire were taken captive by the Central Powers) and obviously when the Polish-Soviet conflict deteriorated, these POWs were not released to Russia.

=== Poland's losses ===
According to Polish historians Karpus and Alexandrowicz, similar number of Polish POWs died in Soviet and Lithuanian camps from 1919 to 1922 – about 20,000 out of about 51,000 captured.

After 1922 the Polish and Russian prisoners were also exchanged among two sides. Ekaterina Peshkova, the chairwoman of organization Assistance to Political Prisoners (Pompolit, Помощь политическим заключенным, Помполит), was awarded an order of Polish Red Cross for her participation in the exchange of POWs after the Polish-Soviet War.

During the memorial ceremony for the victims of the Katyn massacre on April 7, 2010, attended by the Russian and Polish Prime Ministers Vladimir Putin and Donald Tusk, Putin said that, in his private opinion, Stalin (whose refusal to obey orders from the Kremlin resulted in the Russian defeat against Poland in 1920) felt personally responsible for this tragedy, and carried out the executions of Polish officers in Katyn in 1940 out of a sense of revenge.

The Russian Society of Military History called for a Kraków memorial of the Russian victims.

In 2014, the Polish Ministry of Foreign Affairs published further archival documents of International Red Cross and League of Nations missions that inspected the camps. The newly published documents are mostly in French and English.

== See also ==
- Camps for soldiers of the UNR Army interned in Poland (1919–24)
- Polish prisoners and internees in Soviet Russia and Lithuania (1919–21)
- Polish prisoners-of-war in the Soviet Union after 1939
- Finnish Civil War
