= Morgenthau Report =

1919 report on the treatment of Jews in Poland

The Morgenthau Report, officially the Report of the Mission of the United States to Poland, was a report compiled by Henry Morgenthau, Sr. as part of a mission sent by the United States to Poland. The mission was appointed by the American Commission to Negotiate Peace, established by President Woodrow Wilson in the aftermath of World War I, to investigate conditions in the newly re-established Polish state, including reports of violence and unrest affecting various segments of the population, particularly allegations concerning the treatment of Jews.

The mission consisted of three American members — former U.S. ambassador Henry Morgenthau, Brigadier General Edgar Jadwin of the Engineer Corps, and law professor Homer H. Johnson of Cleveland—as well as the British representative Sir Stuart M. Samuel. They were tasked with examining reports of disturbances and alleged abuses in the Second Polish Republic. The report by Morgenthau was published on October 3, 1919.

The final report concluded that the accounts of organized pogroms were unsubstantiated, though it documented a number of violent incidents of an antisemitic character in which approximately 300 Polish Jews were killed, attributing these largely to the instability and disorder of the post-war period. It found no evidence of involvement or endorsement by the Polish government, while noting instances of administrative insensitivity toward Jewish concerns and describing certain responses as reflecting “culpable negligence”.

Morgenthau also commented on tensions arising from both Zionism (Jewish nationalism) and Polish nationalism, as well as broader social and political conflicts that contributed to antisemitic attitudes. The report stated that the condition of Jews in Poland was unsatisfactory and in need of improvement, while also observing that the situation had been widely exaggerated by Jewish critics. Morgenthau emphasized the need for improved Polish–Jewish relations, calling for moderation and cooperation in opposition to extremism on all sides.

The report by Henry Morgenthau, Sr. was published in October 1919, followed by a separate statement prepared jointly by the other members of the mission, Edgar Jadwin and Homer H. Johnson. Both reports concluded that no organized pogroms had occurred.

The Jadwin–Johnson statement differed in its evaluation of certain criticisms of the Polish government and attributed some negative portrayals of conditions in Poland to wartime and postwar propaganda, including that disseminated by German sources.

== History ==
American public opinion was informed primarily by newspaper articles about the Jewish first-party accounts of mistreatment and atrocities committed against them in Eastern Europe during local conflicts such as the Polish-Ukrainian and Polish-Soviet wars which erupted in the aftermath of the World War I. In June 1919, Herbert Hoover, then head of the American Relief Administration (ARA), after discussions with Polish Prime Minister Ignacy Jan Paderewski, wrote to U.S. President Woodrow Wilson warning that the reports of atrocities were damaging the reputation of Poland, a nascent ally being cultivated by the U.S. to counter Soviet Russia. Hoover, whose ARA oversaw relief efforts in Europe, secured the support of Paderewski through blunt warnings that the reports of atrocities against Jews "could develop into a most serious embarrassment to all of us in connection with the relief of Poland." Such pressure for government action reached the point where President Woodrow Wilson sent an official commission to investigate the matter. The Morgenthau commission was dispatched by the United States to verify those reports.

Morgenthau's delegation was met by thousands of Polish Jews in Warsaw and other Polish cities it visited, although Morgenthau – an assimilationist, critical of Jewish nationalism – was shunned by Polish Zionist leaders. While the Polish Jewish press gave the delegation a warm welcome, the non-Jewish Polish press response ranged from cool to overtly hostile with instances of open expressions of anti-Jewish hostility. The daily Robotnicza called for a complete boycott of Polish Jews, while the leading weekly Mysl Niepodlegla accused Wilson of siding against the Polish people in favor of Jews who "live upon usury, fraud, receiving of stolen goods, white slavery, counterfeiting and willful bankruptcy." While Paderewski had welcomed the investigation, Morgenthau found hostility in other Polish political circles, especially from the camps of National Democratic Party ("Endecja") leader Roman Dmowski and his rival, Chief of State Jozef Pilsudski. Compared to Paderewski, who had substantial U.S. support, Pilsudski at the time was regarded as a less reliable military adventurer, and was described by Morgenthau as a "high-class pirate." Pilsudski resented the interference of Morgenthau's mission in Polish affairs, although he was acknowledged as an opponent of the open anti-semitism of Dmowski and a leader committed to a liberal policy towards Jews and other minorities that respected their rights. Morgenthau immersed himself in meetings with representatives of all segments of Polish society from all sides of the dispute. He attended a packed service for the 35 Jewish victims of the Pinsk massacre of April 1919, noting afterward that "This was the first time I ever completely realized what the collective grief of a persecuted people was like."

=== Incidents identified ===
The Morgenthau report ultimately identified eight major incidents in the years 1918–1919, and estimated the number of victims at between 200 and 300 Jews. Four of these were attributed to the actions of deserters and undisciplined individual soldiers; none were blamed on official government policy. Among the incidents investigated by the Morgenthau mission was the Pinsk massacre. In Pinsk, a Polish officer accused a group of Jewish civilians who had gathered at a town meeting to discuss the distribution of American relief aid of being Bolsheviks and of plotting against the Poles. Thirty-five of the men were summarily executed. The Morgenthau mission issued a strong condemnation of the commander responsible:

While it is recognized that certain information of Bolshevist activities in Pinsk had been reported by two Jewish soldiers, we are convinced that Major Luczynski, the Town Commander, showed reprehensible and frivolous readiness to place credence in such untested assertions, and on this insufficient basis took inexcusably drastic action against reputable citizens whose loyal character could have been immediately established by a consultation with any well known non-Jewish inhabitant.

In Lviv (then Lwów or Lemberg) in 1918, after the Polish Army captured the city, 72 Jews were killed by a Polish mob that included Polish soldiers. The report states that in Lviv "disreputable elements [from the Polish Army] plundered to the extent of many millions of crowns the dwellings and stores in the Jewish quarter, and did not hesitate to murder when they met with resistance." Some other events in Poland were later found to have been exaggerated, especially by contemporary newspapers such as the New York Times, although serious abuses against the Jews, including pogroms, continued elsewhere, especially in Ukraine. The result of the concern over the fate of Poland's Jews was a series of explicit clauses in the Versailles Treaty protecting the rights of minorities in Poland. In 1921, Poland's March Constitution gave the Jews the same legal rights as other citizens and guaranteed them religious tolerance.

=== Conclusions ===
While critical of some local Polish authorities on scene, the commission also stated that in general the Polish military and civil authorities did do their best to prevent the incidents and their recurrence in the future. It concluded that some forms of discrimination against Jews was of political rather than anti-Semitic nature, rooted in political competition. The report specifically avoided use of the term "pogrom," noting that the term was used to apply to a wide range of "excesses," (Morgenthau's preferred term) and had no specific definition. Tadeusz Piotrowski, noted that Morgenthau reasons for avoiding the word pogrom was based on the chaotic conditions existing within a war zone.

Morgenthau noted that it would be unfair to condemn the entire Polish nation for the acts of renegade troops or mobs, and believed the attacks were not premeditated or the result of a preconceived plan. He noted, however, that "It is believed that these excesses were the result of a widespread anti-Semitic prejudice aggravated by the belief that the Jewish inhabitants were politically hostile to the Polish State."

Jadwin and Johnson submitted their report separately from Morgenthau. As described by Sonja Wentling in an article for American Jewish History, Morgenthau emphasized that Jews had been deliberately murdered based solely on the fact that they were Jews, while Jadwin and Johnson concluded that the violence against Jews in Poland was largely rooted in Jewish separatism and commercial competition.

== Criticism ==
Assessments of the mission's work varied, with differing interpretations as to whether its findings mitigated or supported concerns regarding antisemitism in Poland. Herbert Hoover described the mission as having performed a "fine service," while some critics characterized its conclusions as insufficiently critical of events in Poland.

Questions regarding potential bias in the Morgenthau report have been raised by a number of scholars. Professor Andrzej Kapiszewski argued that the report may have been influenced by contemporary U.S. foreign policy considerations. Professor Neal Pease wrote that the mission was undertaken in part to address international concerns about Poland's treatment of its Jewish minority, noting that Morgenthau’s perceived sympathy toward Poland was seen as relevant to his appointment and that his report largely absolved the Polish government of direct responsibility.

Contemporary responses in segments of the Jewish press were also critical of the report. Some commentators argued that Morgenthau and Samuel, the Jewish members of the commission, had not adequately represented the severity of the events and accused them of minimizing the violence.
