= William W. Hagen =

American historian (born 1942)

William W. Hagen (born 1942) is a historian and professor of history at the University of California-Davis.

Hagen's focus is on modern European history, primarily in relation to Germany and Eastern Europe. He obtained his B.A. from Harvard University and his M.A. and Ph.D. from the University of Chicago. Starting as assistant professor in 1970, he became associate professor of history in 1977 and professor of history in 1981. From 1992 to 1998, Hagen served as director of the UC Davis Center for History, Society, and Culture. In 1996, he served as president of the Conference Group for Central European History (American Historical Association).Recipient of grants, including from the Alexander von Humboldt-Stiftung, National Endowment for the Humanities, and the Institute for Advanced Study, Princeton, NJ, where he was fellow in residence 1990-91. For fuller details, see https://hagen.faculty.ucdavis.edu/

== Select bibliography ==
- "National Solidarity and Organic Work in Prussian Poland, 1815-1914," The Journal of Modern History Vol. 44, No. 1, March 1972.
- Germans, Poles and Jews: the Nationality Conflict in the Prussian East, 1772-1914 (University of Chicago Press, 1980).
- "Working for the Junker: The Standard of Living of Manorial Laborers in Brandenburg, 1584-1810," The Journal of Modern History Vol. 58, No. 1, March 1986.
- Seventeenth-Century Crisis in Brandenburg: The Thirty Years' War, the Destabilization of Serfdom, and the Rise of Absolutism (American Historical Review, 94 (1989): 302–335).
- "Before the 'Final Solution': Toward a Comparative Analysis of Political Antisemitism in Interwar Germany and Poland," Journal of Modern History Vol. 68, No. 2, June 1996. This work has received the Chester Penn Higby Prize for best article in the Journal of Modern History in a two-year period (conferred by the Modern European History Section of the American Historical Association).
- Ordinary Prussians: Brandenburg Junkers and Villagers, 1500-1840 (Cambridge University Press, 2002). This work has been awarded the 2002-2003 Hans Rosenberg Prize of the Central European Conference Group (American Historical Association) for best North American book on German history.
- The Moral Economy of Popular Violence: The Pogrom in Lwów, November 1918. This article appeared in Robert Blobaum, ed., Antisemitism and Its Opponents in Modern Poland (Cornell University Press, 2005), pp. 124–47.
- German History in Modern Times: Four Lives of the Nation (Cambridge University Press, 2012).
- "Anti-Jewish Violence in Poland, 1914–1920. Cambridge University Press, 2018. 540 pp., two maps, 18 illustrations
- "Interpreting the History of Pogroms in Poland :Are “Causes” Actually “Contexts” and — If So — For What?" PRZEGLĄD HISTORYCZNY, TOM CXII, 2021, ZESZ. 3, pp. 672–96.
