= Pinsk massacre =

Massacre of Jews by Poland

- Part of pogroms during the Russian Civil War and the Polish–Soviet War
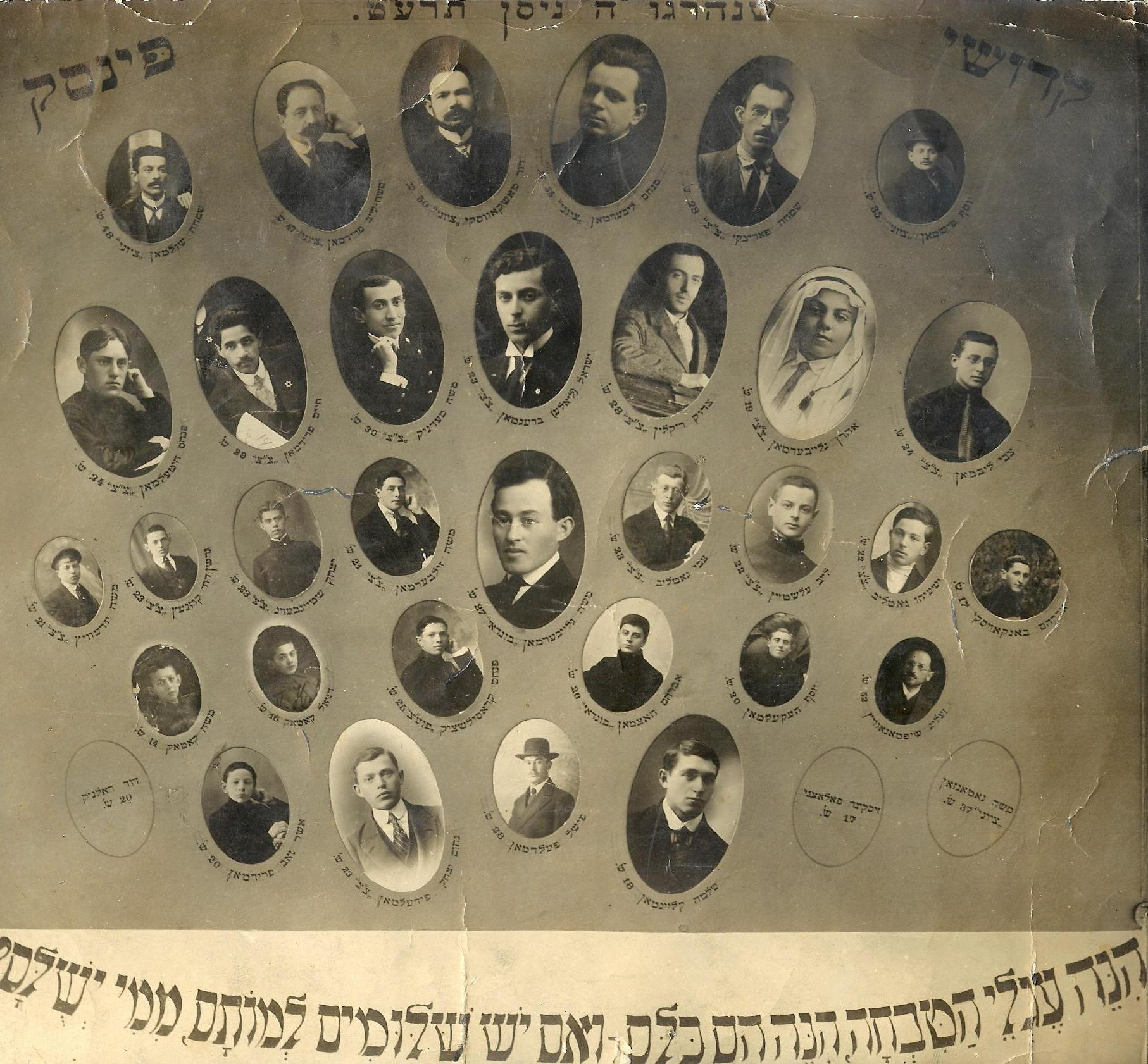
- Photographs of those executed
- Location: Pinsk
- Date: April 5, 1919
- Target: Jewish "Bolshevik infiltrators"
- Attack type: Summary executions
- Deaths: 35 Jews
- Perpetrators: General Antoni Listowski; Major Aleksander Narbutt-Łuczyński of the Polish Army

The Pinsk massacre was the mass execution of thirty-five Jewish residents of Pinsk on April 5, 1919, by the Polish Army. The Polish commander, reportedly acting on warnings from two Jewish soldiers about a possible Bolshevik uprising, sought to instill terror among the Jewish population. The event occurred during the opening stages of the Polish–Soviet War, after the Polish Army had captured Pinsk. The Jews who were executed had been arrested while meeting in a Zionist center to discuss the distribution of American relief aid; the meeting was described by the Poles as an "illegal gathering". The Polish officer-in-charge ordered the summary execution of the meeting participants without trial, and based on the information about the gathering's purpose that was founded on hearsay. The officer's decision was defended by high-ranking Polish military officers, but was widely criticized by international public opinion.

== Mass execution ==
The battle for Pinsk was won in March 1919 by General Antoni Listowski of the Polish Army regional commander of the Polish forces in Podlasie. The city was taken over in a late-winter blizzard with considerable human losses sustained by the 34th Infantry Regiment under Major Narbutt-Łuczyński who forced the Bolsheviks to retreat to the other side of the river. Before their withdrawal however, the Russians had raised an armed militia composed of a small, non-representative group of local peasants and young Jewish communists who kept on shooting at the Poles from concealment.

An interim civilian administration was set up in Pińsk, but the hostilities continued. There were instances of Polish soldiers being singled out at night and murdered. On April 5, 1919, seventy-five Jewish residents of the city met at a local Zionist center to discuss the distribution of American relief aid according to eyewitness accounts. Public meetings were banned at the time because random shots were still being heard and the town had recently been under Bolshevik control. According to some accounts the meeting had received approval from Polish military authorities. When major Aleksander Narbutt-Łuczyński heard that the meeting was a Bolshevik gathering, he initially ordered his troops to arrest the meeting organizers. The night before the event, two Jewish soldiers, Daniel Kozak and Motel Kolkier, reported, they had been offered a bribe to join a Bolshevik conspiracy in the local synagogue. The town commander, fearing a Bolshevik uprising, which he did not investigate, ordered the execution of the hostages. Within an hour, thirty-five detainees, including women and children, were put against the wall of the town's cathedral, and machine-gunned by a firing squad composed of the Polish soldiers. It was claimed that some men and women were stripped and beaten.

According to historian Norman Davies, the executions were intended as a deterrent to those planning any further unrest. Davies notes that the exact nature of the meeting was never clarified, and that it was variously described as Committee of American Relief distribution, Bolshevik cell or assembly of local co-operative.

== Initial reports ==
Initial reports of the massacre, echoing the claims that the victims were Bolshevik conspirators, were based on an account given by an American investigator, Dr. Franciszek (Francis) Fronczak, who was a former health commissioner of Buffalo, New York. Fronczak became member of the Paris-based Polish National Committee (Komitet Narodowy Polski, KNP), where he directed the organization's Department of Public Welfare helping thousands of refugees. He arrived in Europe in May 1918, with permission of the State Department. Back home, he was a leader of the National Polish Department of America, a major organization of Polish-American expats. Upon his arrival, he identified himself to local authorities as the ARC mission's Lieutenant Colonel sent to investigate local health conditions in hospitals. Although not an eyewitness, Fronczak accepted Luczynski's claims that the aid distribution meeting was actually a Bolshevik gathering to obtain arms and destroy the small Polish garrison in Pinsk. He himself claimed to have heard shots being fired from the Jewish meeting hall when Polish troops approached. He also claimed he had heard a confession from a mortally wounded Jew when he arrived at the town square where the executions had taken place. The initial wire reports of the massacre and a Polish military report which cleared the local authorities of any wrongdoing and denounced the Jewish victims, was based largely on Fronczak's testimony.

The version of the events cited by the Polish parliament were based on the account of Barnet Zuckerman, a representative of the American Jewish Joint Distribution Committee who had interviewed survivors on the day of the massacre. At the time, he was in charge of delivering the relief aid from the committee, negotiating the appropriate way to distribute it. Instead of personally investigating the matter, he went from Brest to Warsaw as soon as he learned of what had happened, where he publicized his version of the events as -"A Massacre of Innocent Civilians".

In an attempt to assure Herbert Hoover that everything was alright, Ignacy Jan Paderewski said that:

"In this district [the region around Pinsk], which is the scene of serious warfare against the Bolshevists, it becomes necessary to act with considerable energy and prompt decision. It is a case of destroying the Bolshevistic disease or being destroyed by it."

Despite attempts of the Polish authorities to suppress the story, accounts of the incident in the international press caused a scandal which would have strong repercussions abroad.

== Reactions ==
=== Polish army ===
The Polish Group Commander General Antoni Listowski claimed that the gathering was a Bolshevik meeting and that the Jewish population attacked the Polish troops. The overall tension of the military campaign was brought up as a justification for the crime. In his order to the population of Pinsk of 7 April 1919, two days after the massacre, Listowski justified the massacre as the "town's Jews as a whole were guilty of the crime of blatant ingratitude".

The Polish military refused to give investigators access to documents, and the officers and soldiers were never punished. Major Łuczyński was not charged for any wrongdoing and was eventually transferred and promoted reaching the rank of colonel (1919) and general (1924) in the Polish army. The events were criticized in the Sejm (Polish parliament), but representatives of the Polish army denied any wrongdoing.

=== International ===
In the Western press of the time, the massacre was referred to as the Polish Pogrom at Pinsk, and was noticed by wider public opinion. Upon a request of Polish authorities to president Woodrow Wilson, an American mission was sent to Poland to investigate nature of the alleged atrocities. The mission, led by Jewish-American diplomat Henry Morgenthau, Sr., published the Morgenthau Report on October 3, 1919. According to the findings of this commission, a total of about 300 Jews lost their lives in this and related incidents. The commission also severely criticized the actions of Major Łuczyński and his superiors with regards to handling of the events in Pinsk. At the same time the allied commission determined that the cause of the events couldn't be attributed to antisemitism and the United States representative lieutenant Foster stated that Major's Łuczyński's actions were justified in the circumstances.

Morgenthau later recounted the massacre in autobiography, where he wrote:

Who were these thirty-five victims? They were the leaders of the local Jewish community, the spiritual and moral leader of the 5,000 Jews in a city, eighty-five percent of the population of which was Jewish, the organizers of the charities, the directors of the hospitals, the friends of the poor. And yet, to that incredibly brutal, and even more incredibly stupid, officer who ordered their execution, they were only so many Jews.

=== Commemoration ===
In 1926, kibbutz Gevat (Gvat) was established by emigrants from Pinsk to the British Mandate of Palestine in commemoration of the Pinsk massacre victims.

== Controversy ==
English historian Norman Davies has questioned whether the meeting was explicitly authorized and notes that "the nature of the illegal meeting, variously described as a Bolshevik cell, an assembly of the local co-operative society, and a meeting of the Committee for American Relief, was never clarified". American historian Richard Lukas described the Pinsk massacre as "an execution of a thirty-five Bolshevik infiltrators...justified in the eyes of an American investigator", while David Engel has noted that the Morgenthau report, the summary of an American investigation into the Pinsk and other massacres led by Jewish-American Henry Morgenthau, Sr., contradicts the accounts presented by Davies and Lukas. In its summary of its investigation of the Pinsk massacre, the Morgenthau report notes that, with respect to the claims of the Polish authorities that the meeting was a gathering of a Bolshevik nature,

We are convinced that no arguments of a Bolshevist nature were mentioned in the meeting in question. While it is recognized that certain information of Bolshevist activities in Pinsk had been reported by two Jewish soldiers, we are convinced that Major Luczynski, the Town Commander, showed reprehensible and frivolous readiness to place credence in such untested assertions, and on this insufficient basis took inexcusably drastic action against reputable citizens whose loyal character could have been immediately established by a consultation with any well known non-Jewish inhabitant.

The report also found that the official statements by General Antoni Listowski, the Polish Group Commander, claiming that Polish troops had been attacked by Jews, were "devoid of foundation."

In either case, Davies concluded that "[the topic] was well suited for sensational headlines... the publicity reflected badly on the Polish army [and] conformed the popular idea throughout the world that all Polish soldiers were anti-semites and all Bolshevicks Jews".

== See also ==
- List of massacres in Belarus
- Vilna offensive

== Bibliography ==
- Lewandowski, Józef (1988). "History and Myth: Pinsk, April 1919". Polin 2, 1988.
- Czerniakiewicz, Andrzej (2004). "Ekscesy antyżydowskie wojsk polskich na Kresach Północno-Wschodnich RP". Świat niepożegnany (in Polish). Warsaw/London: ISP PAN / RYTM. ISBN 83-7399-083-6.
