= Russians in Toruń =

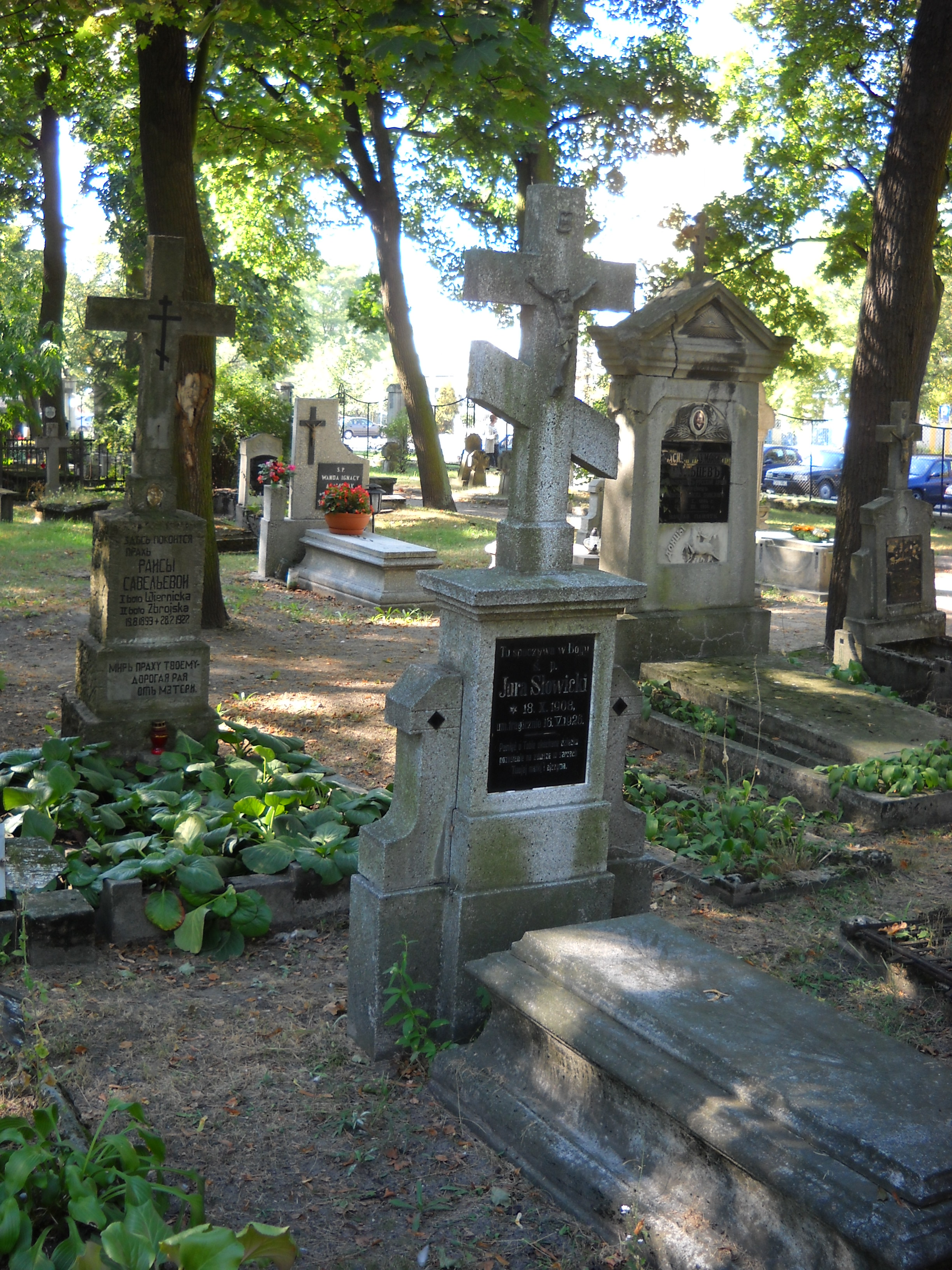
Graves of Russians settled in Toruń before World War II at the garrison cemetery on Grudziądzka Street

The Russian community in Toruń, predominantly adhering to the Eastern Orthodox faith, became significantly present in the city during the interwar period. The Russians who settled in Toruń at that time were mostly opponents of the October Revolution, belonging to the Russian white émigré, or those who fought on the Polish side in the Polish–Soviet War and were interned in the Second Polish Republic after the signing of the Treaty of Riga. Their numbers stabilized at around 100 individuals. During the interwar period, the community was well-integrated, engaging in cultural activities and actively participating in the life of the Orthodox parish in Toruń. Their activity ceased after World War II when the Russian community became the target of repression by the Security Service.

Russians were likely present in Toruń on a smaller scale even earlier, although they did not form a visible community in the city's life. The oldest trace that may indicate their presence is a gravestone with an inscription in Cyrillic, dated 1668.

== Prisoners of war from World War I ==
The first larger groups of Russians appeared in Pomerania after the defeats suffered by the Russian army in East Prussia in 1914. This group numbered at least several tens of thousands (as many prisoners were taken after the Battle of Tannenberg). The prisoners were distributed in hastily organized camps in Tuchola, Czersk, and Gdańsk, where they remained until the end of the war. In November 1918, they were given the possibility of legally returning to Russia. However, several hundred individuals did not take up this opportunity. Documents from the Provincial Office of Pomeranian Voivodeship in Toruń mention 240 former Russian prisoners who stayed in the province. It is also known that these individuals sought passports from the Russian Consulate in Warsaw, receiving negative replies and becoming stateless. Statistics, however, do not specify how many of the former prisoners settled in Toruń.

== Interned soldiers from the Polish–Soviet War ==
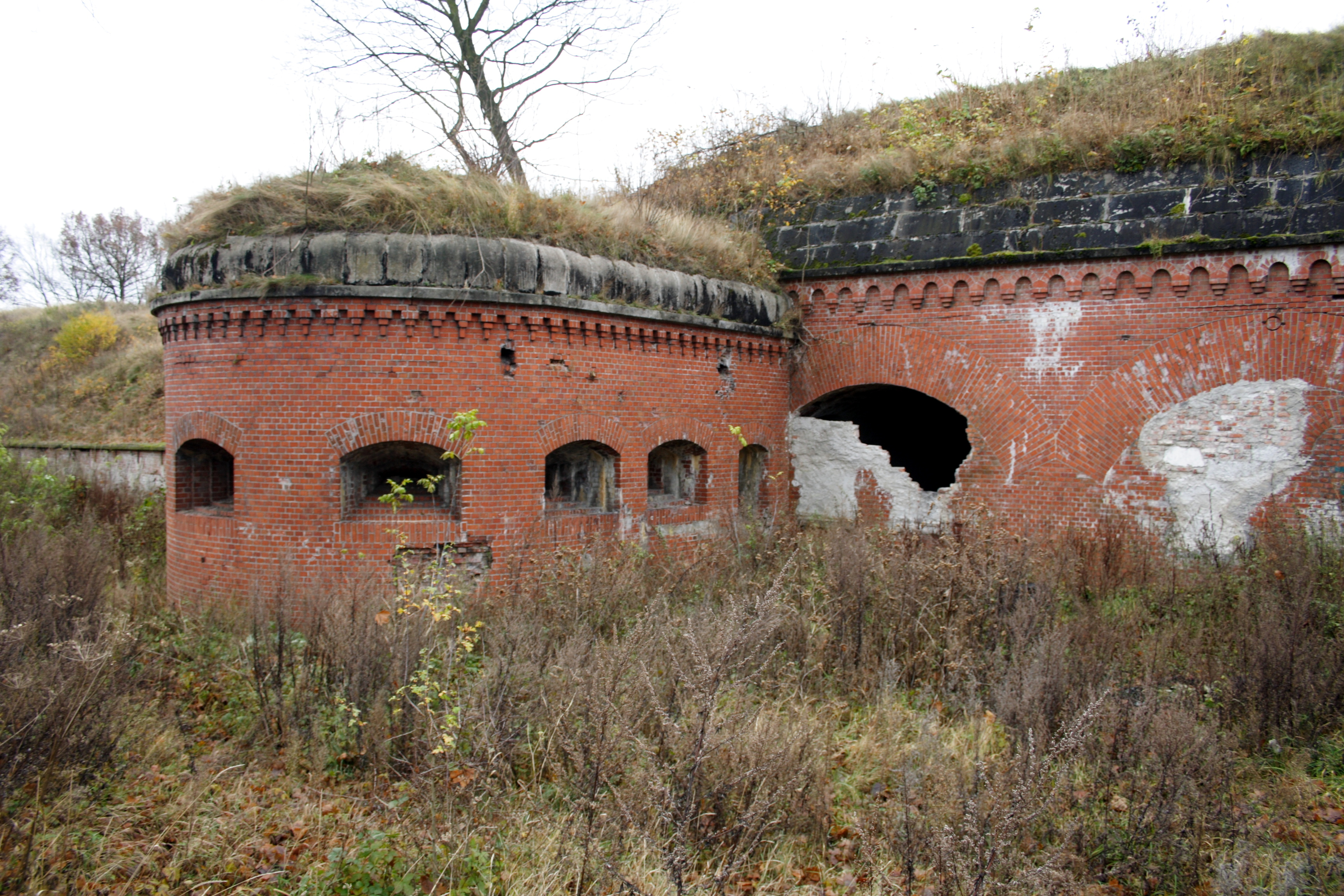
Contemporary view of Fort XII in Toruń, one of the buildings of Internment Camp No. 15

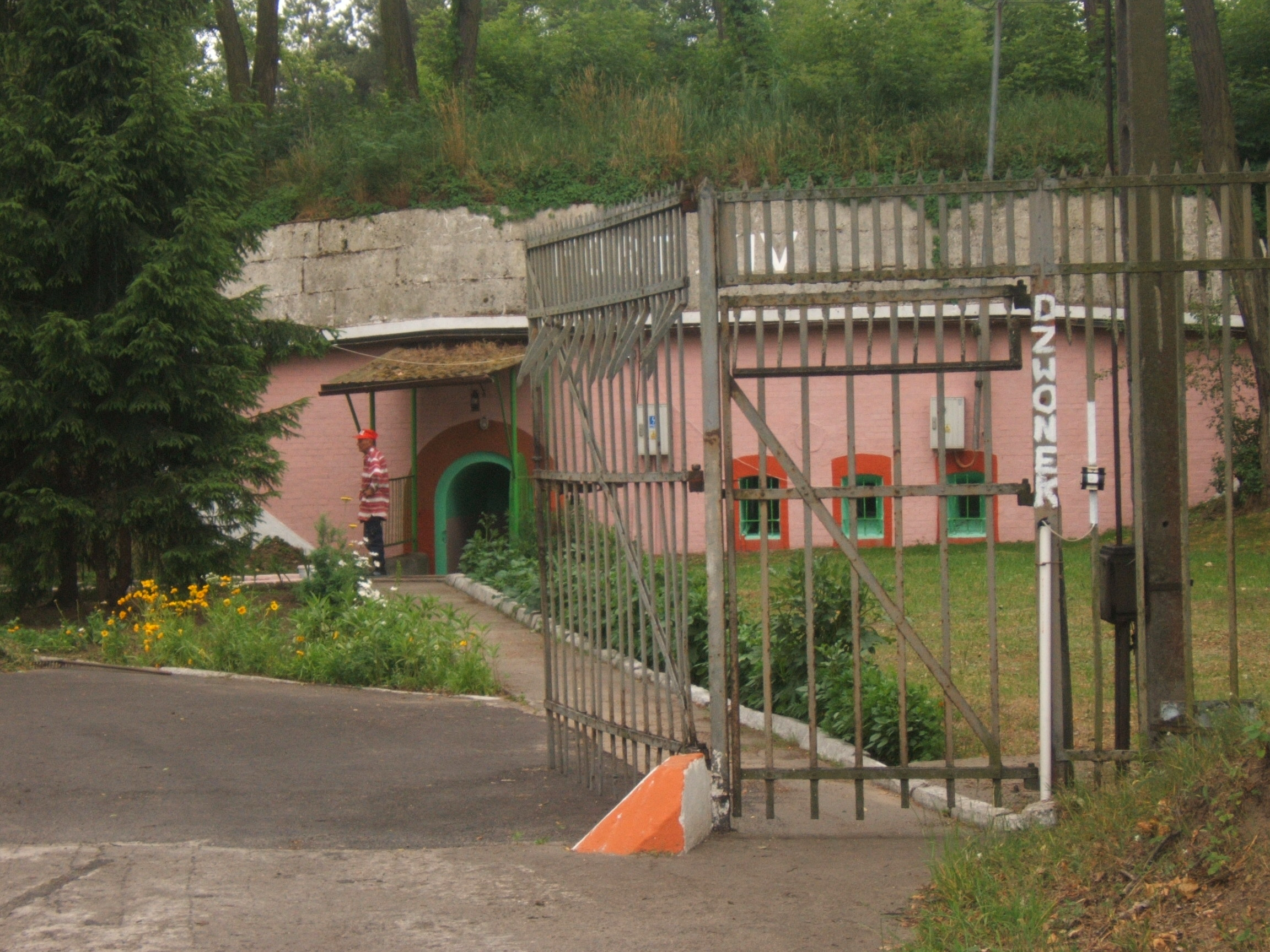
Contemporary view of Fort XIV in Toruń

After the conclusion of the Polish–Soviet War in December 1920, Internment Camp No. 15 was established in Toruń, located in selected structures of the Toruń Fortress: Forts XI, XIII, XV (residential buildings), XIV, XII (guard companies), and Fort II (hospital). The Russian internees were from the units of General Stanisław Bułak-Bałachowicz, former Cossack units commanded by Ataman W. Jakowlew, and the 3rd Russian Army under the command of General Borys Peremykin, which was part of the armed forces commanded by General Pyotr Wrangel.

The first transport of internees arrived in Toruń on 25 December 1920, followed by another group five days later. The first group consisted of 1,000 soldiers and officers from Bułak-Bałachowicz's units, and the second group was twice as large. In the camp, there were 591 officers and 857 soldiers from Peremykin's army, as well as 130 civilians associated with them. A smaller number of internees came from Cossack units, totaling 24 civilians, 570 soldiers, and 126 officers. Additionally, groups of former soldiers from other camps, such as 200 ex-soldiers of General Anton Denikin's army from the Tuchola camp, were temporarily sent to work in Toruń.

The camp operated until the fall of 1921. During this time, at least 300 people successfully escaped, likely due to the poor living and sanitary conditions in the camp. These escapees usually left Toruń, heading toward the eastern parts of Poland or larger cities. Conversely, other escapees from Internment Camp No. 7 in Tuchola arrived in Toruń. After the closure of the camp, some soldiers and officers were allowed to remain in the city legally. The condition for this was finding stable employment, after which an internment release card and residence permit were issued. To obtain the permit, many Russians resorted to temporary illegal work. Among those who stayed in Toruń were mostly officers and their families, who were employed in private businesses or assisted in the Polish Army's units. The number of this group is estimated at around 220 people.

Toruń also became home to part of a group of 400 Bolshevik prisoners of war from the Tuchola camp. After the closure of the camp in November 1922, they remained in the Pomeranian Voivodeship. Toruń, along with Grudziądz and Bydgoszcz, was considered one of the most attractive places for settlement due to opportunities for stable employment.

== Russian minority in the interwar period ==
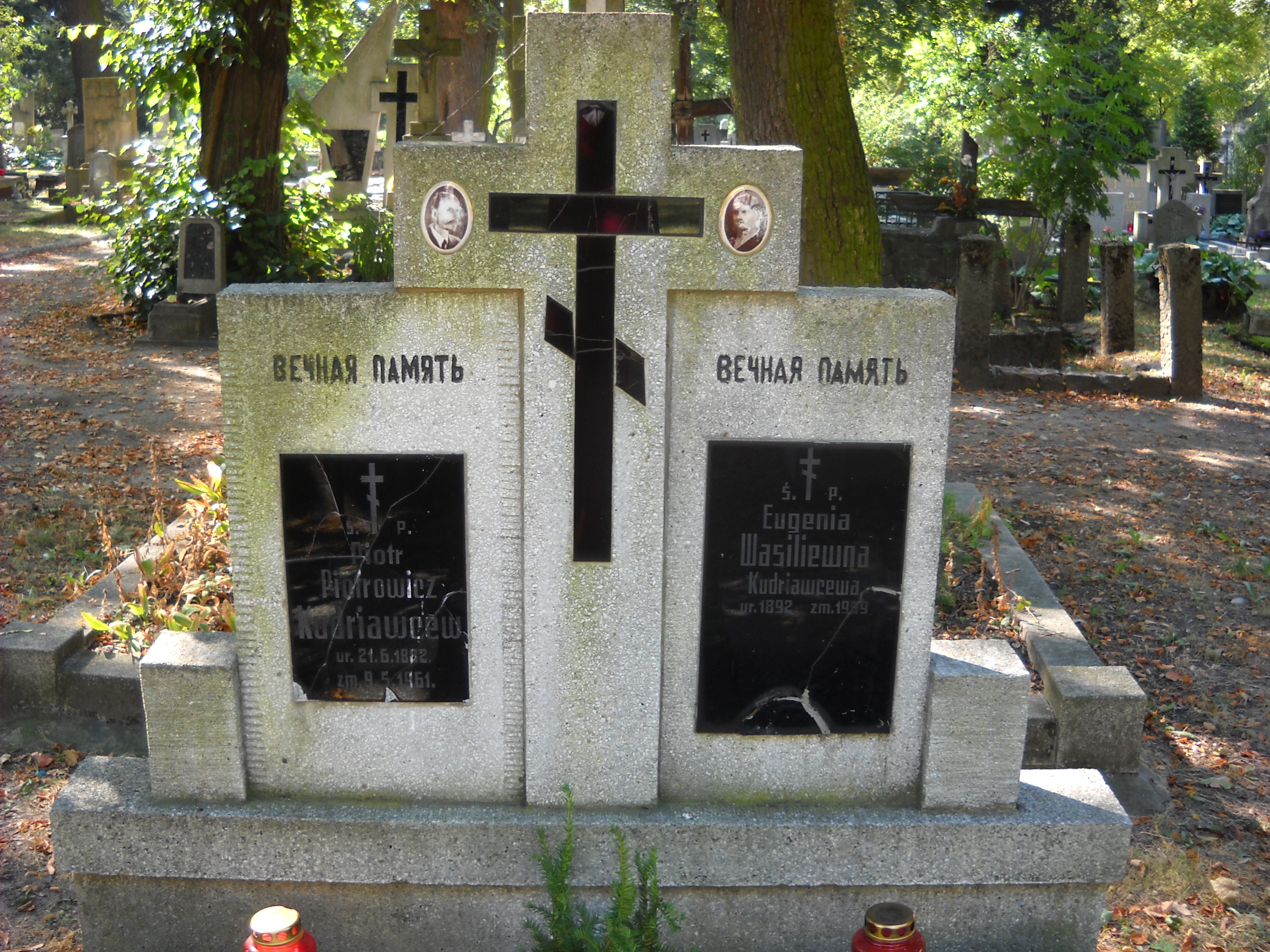
Grave of Piotr Kudryiavcev, activist of the Russian minority in Toruń before World War II, at the garrison cemetery in Toruń

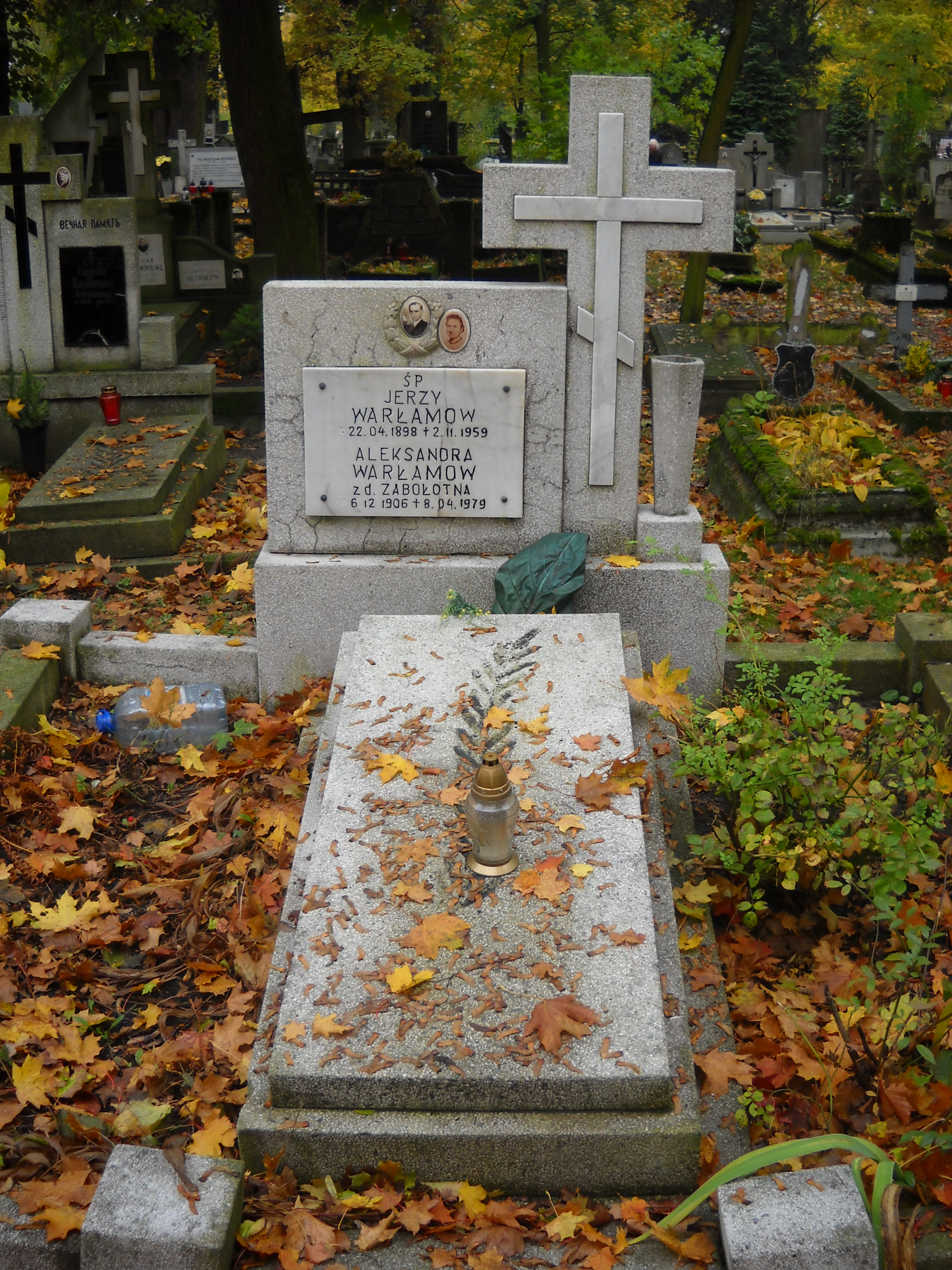
Grave of Jerzy Varlamov, prewar activist of the Orthodox Brotherhood in Toruń, at the garrison cemetery in Toruń

In 1923, the number of Russians permanently residing in Toruń stabilized at around 100. On 22 July 1924, the city began registering Russian and Ukrainian foreigners, who were required to declare whether they intended to stay in Poland or leave. Failing to comply with the registration order could result in expulsion from the Second Polish Republic. According to a 1923 census, most Russians who remained in Toruń worked as artisans in various trades, with smaller numbers employed as laborers, technicians, doctors, merchants, or clerks. Many were former officers, while rank-and-file soldiers represented the smallest group among those remaining in Toruń.

As of February 1922, most of the Russian community consisted of single men (156 individuals, compared to 23 men with families). In 1923, a Russian named Popov, along with a Jew named Alter and a German named Schulz, established a trading company called "Poppow i Ska".

Russians living in Toruń quickly began organizing cultural activities within their community. Even during their time in Internment Camp No. 15, they printed periodicals such as Nasza Gazeta, Donskij Kozak, and Otzwuki using duplicating methods. They also organized literacy courses for illiterate individuals and formed musical ensembles, theatrical groups, and choirs. These performances were open to the public. A group of Russians staged Giuseppe Verdi's operas La Traviata and Rigoletto in Toruń, receiving positive reviews in the local press. The YMCA played a role in organizing cultural life both in the camp and later in the Russian community of Toruń. Russians also established a football team that played matches against local clubs such as Czarni and Gryf.

In addition to civilian Russians who had settled permanently, Russian soldiers serving in the Polish Army were also present in Toruń. Due to a system that assigned conscripts to units far from their place of birth or previous residence, numerous groups of Ukrainians, Belarusians, and Jews from the country's eastern provinces were sent to Toruń during the 1922–1923 draft. Among these recruits were Polish citizens of Russian nationality, who constituted 0.97% of all soldiers as of February 1923.

| Date | Number of Russians |
|---|---|
| December 1920 | ~3,000 |
| April 1922 | ~400 |
| February 1923 | 114 |
| December 1928 | 100 |
| December 1929 | 105 |
| May 1930 | 112 |
| January 1931 | 116 |
| September 1931 | 116 |
| August 1932 | 98 |

=== Political activity ===
The Russian community in Toruń began forming political organizations early on. In the spring of 1921, they submitted a request to the city authorities to register the Committee of Citizens of Eastern Siberia and the Far East. The request was denied. The headquarters of this committee was intended to be located at 32 Główna Street in Podgórz. A year later, in June 1922, another application was submitted to register an association called the Russian Committee. Its proposed statutes stated that the committee's aim was to provide Russians with legal and material assistance and to address their cultural and religious needs. The association was to be open to Polish members of both genders, provided they paid an annual membership fee of 600 Polish marks. The authorities, however, also denied this request, citing that the group intended to unite supporters of restoring the Russian Empire to its pre-1914 borders, opposing Poland's independence. The main initiators of the committee, Lieutenant Colonel Sergiusz Glushkov and Colonel Borys Tymoshchenko, were subsequently interned at the camp near Strzałkowo. The decision of the Pomeranian Voivode was influenced by Tymoshchenko's known monarchist activities, his involvement in similar organizations in Gdańsk, and his connections to related groups in Paris and Berlin, as confirmed by a search of his residence.

Ultimately, no monarchist organization was ever established in Toruń. However, monarchist sentiments remained strong among members of the Russian minority. For example, they were expressed through memorial services held on anniversaries of the deaths of General Wrangel and Empress Maria Feodorovna.

On a smaller scale, some Russian émigrés showed communist sympathies. A shoemaker named Włodzimierz Ivanov organized meetings of this nature in the city, which were halted by police intervention in December 1921. Participants in the disrupted meeting were sent to camps in Tuchola and near Strzałkowo.

Despite the monarchist leanings of many Russian residents in Toruń, they did not engage in anti-Polish activities. On the contrary, they often emphasized their loyalty to the Second Polish Republic. In 1928, a service was held in Toruń's Orthodox church for the well-being of Poland, during which the church was adorned with white-and-red flags. Similar decorations appeared on the homes of Russian residents. The following year, they also participated in celebrations marking Marshal Józef Piłsudski's name day.

=== Social organizations ===
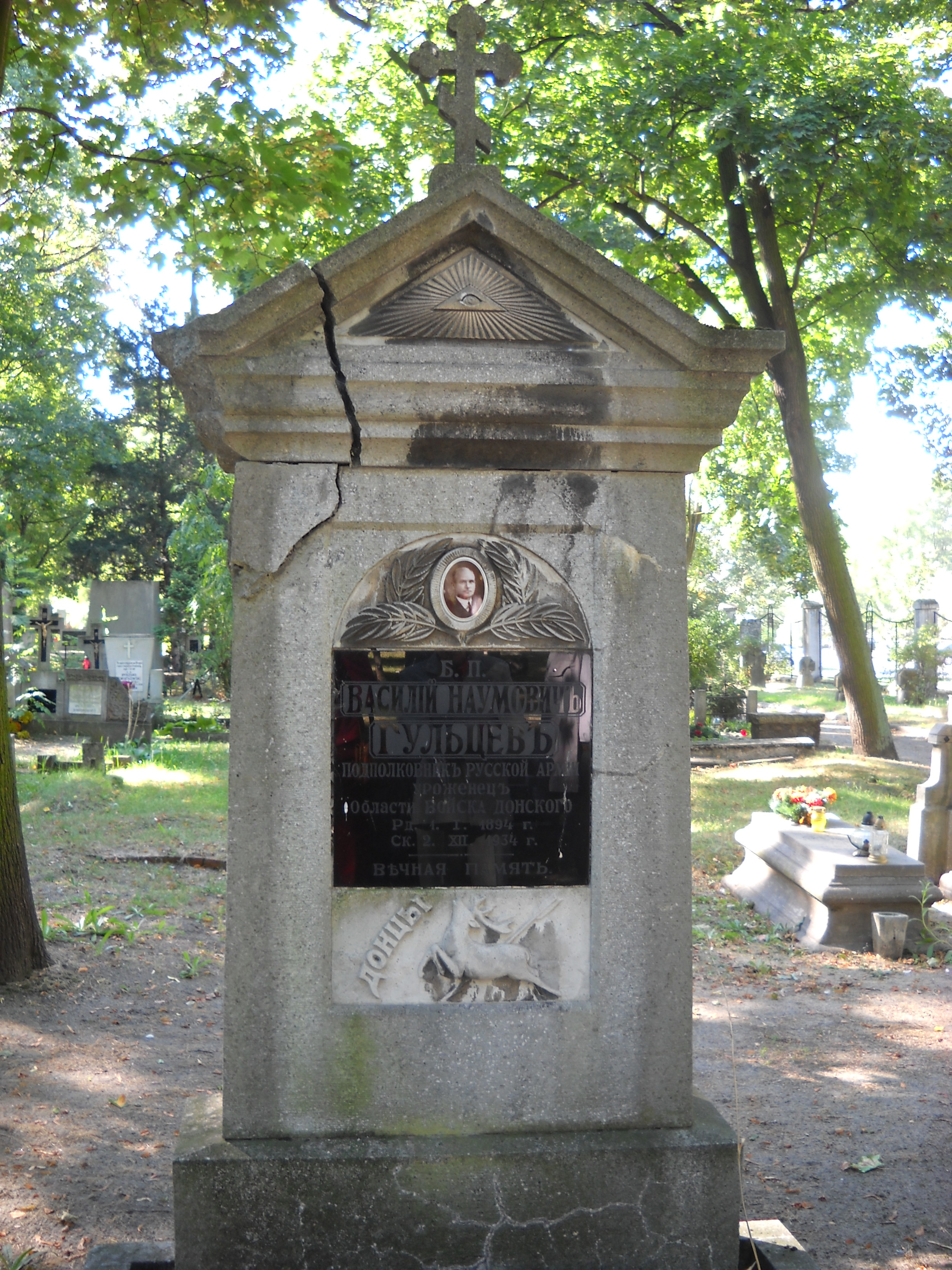
Grave of Lieutenant Colonel Vasiliy Gultsev, organizer and first president of the Toruń Branch of the Russian Relief Committee for Emigrants in Poland, at the garrison cemetery in Toruń

In January 1923, the Russian community in Toruń attracted the attention of the Russian Relief Committee, established in August 1921 and headquartered in Warsaw. One of its first projects in the city was organizing a Russian-language library, overseen by Vasiliy Gultsev, a representative of the committee. Toruń authorities approved the establishment of the library, which was located in a rented space at 116 Mickiewicz Street. Initially, the library held only between 80 and 90 volumes and lacked a reading room. Its services were free of charge, though city authorities viewed the library as a potential meeting place for émigrés and kept it under observation.

On 15 August 1926, the first meeting of the Toruń Branch of the Russian Relief Committee for Emigrants in Poland took place at 6 Mostowa Street. The branch aimed to implement the committee's statutory tasks locally, including providing assistance to Russian émigrants, refugees, and former prisoners of war in Poland, representing them before authorities, and fostering educational and cultural activities within their community. Specific tasks for the Toruń branch included managing the Russian library, offering material support to impoverished Russians in Toruń, and providing legal advice. The branch's first president was Vasiliy Gultsev, succeeded by S. Isayevich on 9 September 1928, and then by Gultsev again on 1 December 1929. Records from a general meeting in September 1928 show that the organization requested financial support from the city and permission for additional fundraising to assist the poorest Russian émigrants.

One of the most visible aspects of the committee's activities in Toruń was its cultural engagement, including organizing Russian music concerts and lectures. These events often addressed contemporary issues in the Soviet Union. For example, on 31 March 1928, attorney K. Nikolayev delivered a public lecture titled Russia's Path After the Revolution, and on 5 April 1930, journalist M. Donarski spoke about religious persecution in the Soviet Union. The latter event attracted about 100 attendees.

Both the Russian minority and the smaller Ukrainian minority in Toruń were generally viewed positively by the Polish majority. By 1932, any earlier suspicions towards the Russian community had largely subsided. Authorities ceased surveillance of this group, focusing instead on the much larger German minority in the city.

=== Religion ===
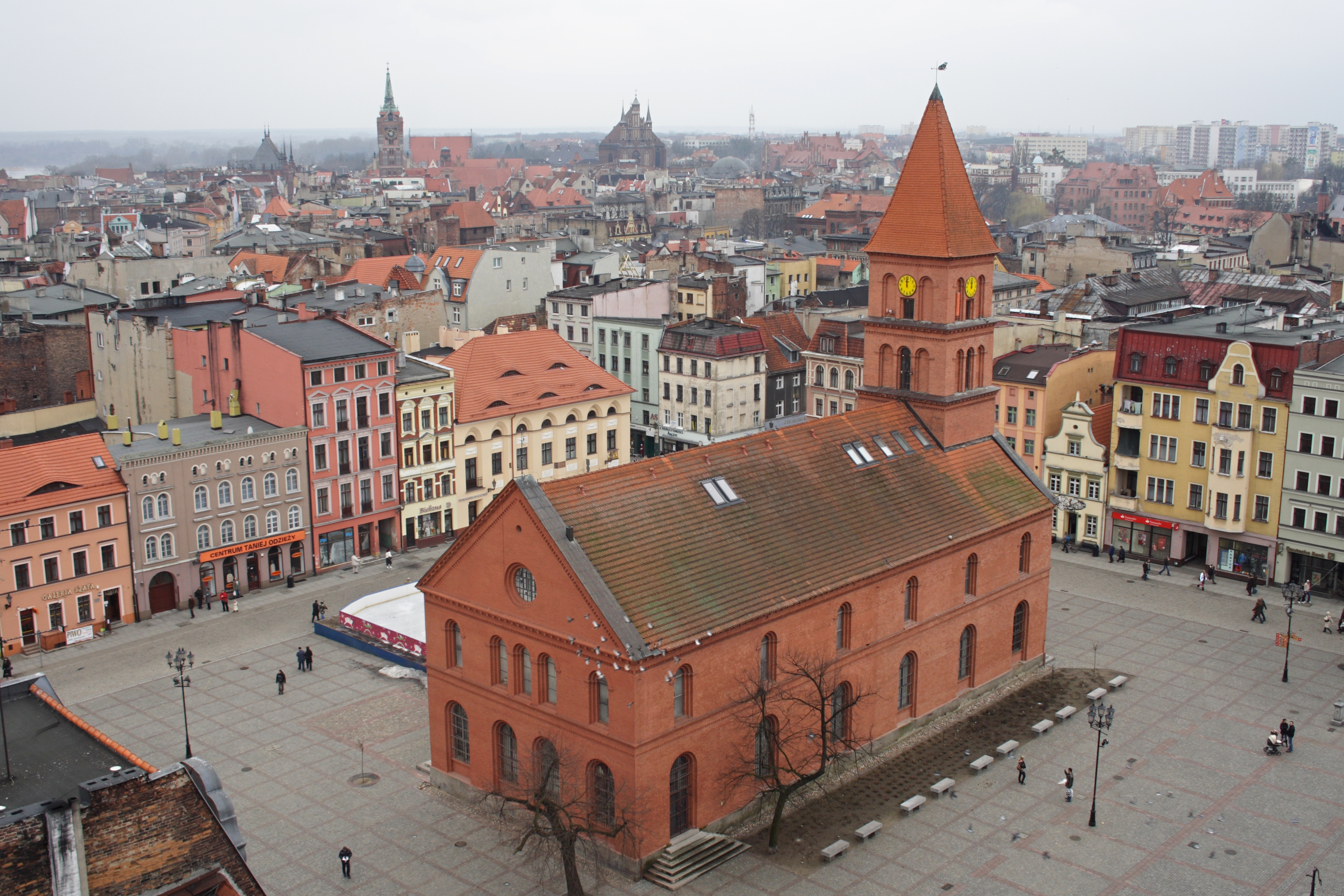
Building of the former Evangelical congregation on New Town Market Square in Toruń was used as a place for Orthodox worship during the interwar period

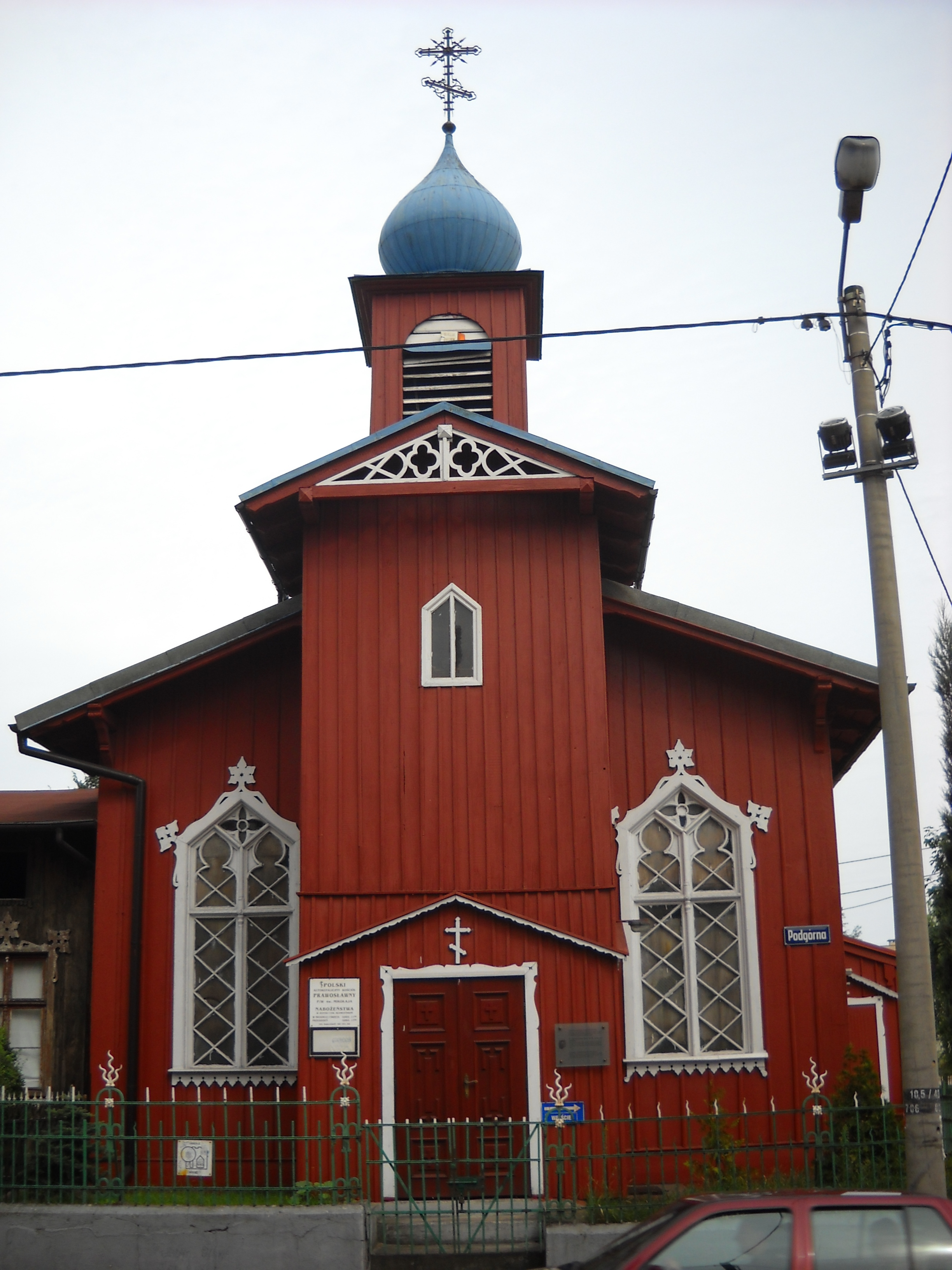
Church of St. Nicholas on Podgórna Street

The Russians permanently residing in Pomerania were followers of Orthodoxy, although there were occasional cases of conversion to Catholicism. A temporary Orthodox chapel dedicated to St. Nicholas operated in the Internment Camp. This parish remained active even after the formal closure of the camp until the status of Russian and Ukrainian emigrants was settled in 1924. Due to the lack of a church or even a domestic chapel, the Orthodox community rented various spaces: the Evangelical-Augsburg chapel on Strumykowa Street (March–October 1922) and the Evangelical-Reformed chapel on Dominikańska Street. On 6 January 1924, the Orthodox community took over the military chapel at the 8th Sanitary Battalion, which became the parish church. It served Orthodox soldiers stationed in Toruń as well as Russian and Ukrainian emigrants.

In 1927, the parish gained the right to use the former Evangelical Church of the Holy Trinity on New Town Market Square in Toruń, which was consecrated as the Church of St. Nicholas. This building served as a church until 1939, when the Nazi occupying authorities closed it. However, they allowed the establishment of a new, still-active Orthodox church in the former Old Lutheran church building at 69 Podgórna Street, which retains the same dedication.

The existence of the Orthodox parish played a crucial role in integrating the Russian minority and fostering its cultural life. A particularly significant figure for the community was the parish's first priest, Chaplain Stefan Rudyk, whose activities on behalf of the Russians raised concerns among military authorities, ultimately leading to his transfer to Grudziądz and later to Katowice.

On the initiative of the Russian community in Toruń, a request for the registration of the Orthodox Brotherhood in Toruń was submitted on 29 December 1925. The application included a draft statute stipulating that the brotherhood would be an association open to all Orthodox believers, regardless of nationality. It also made the establishment of the brotherhood conditional on the consent of the Metropolitan of Warsaw and all Poland. The municipal authorities registered the brotherhood on 26 January 1926, and a positive decision from the Warsaw Metropolis followed on May 12 of the same year. At its constitutional meeting held on 14 July 1926 in a venue at 6 Mostowa Street, the brotherhood had 104 members (not all were Russians).

The brotherhood was involved not only in religious activities but also organized amateur performances, concerts, lectures, and various gatherings. Membership fees amounted to 1 PLN per month. The brotherhood served as the main organizer of the choir singing in Toruń's Orthodox church and prepared annual Christmas celebrations open to all Russians. It also conducted cultural activities, including concerts of church music and lectures on related topics.

The brotherhood's activities complemented those of the Toruń Branch of the Russian Welfare Committee, and joint membership in both organizations was common. However, this cooperation ended after 1930 due to personal conflicts among Russian activists in Toruń. Until then, the two organizations had shared a venue at 66 Bydgoska Street and a joint library. After the split, the Toruń Branch of the Russian Welfare Committee relocated, along with its book collection, to rented premises at 26A Bydgoska Street.

The stance of the Russians living in Toruń regarding the outbreak of World War II and the Nazi occupation of the city has not yet been researched or documented.

== Russian minority after 1945 ==
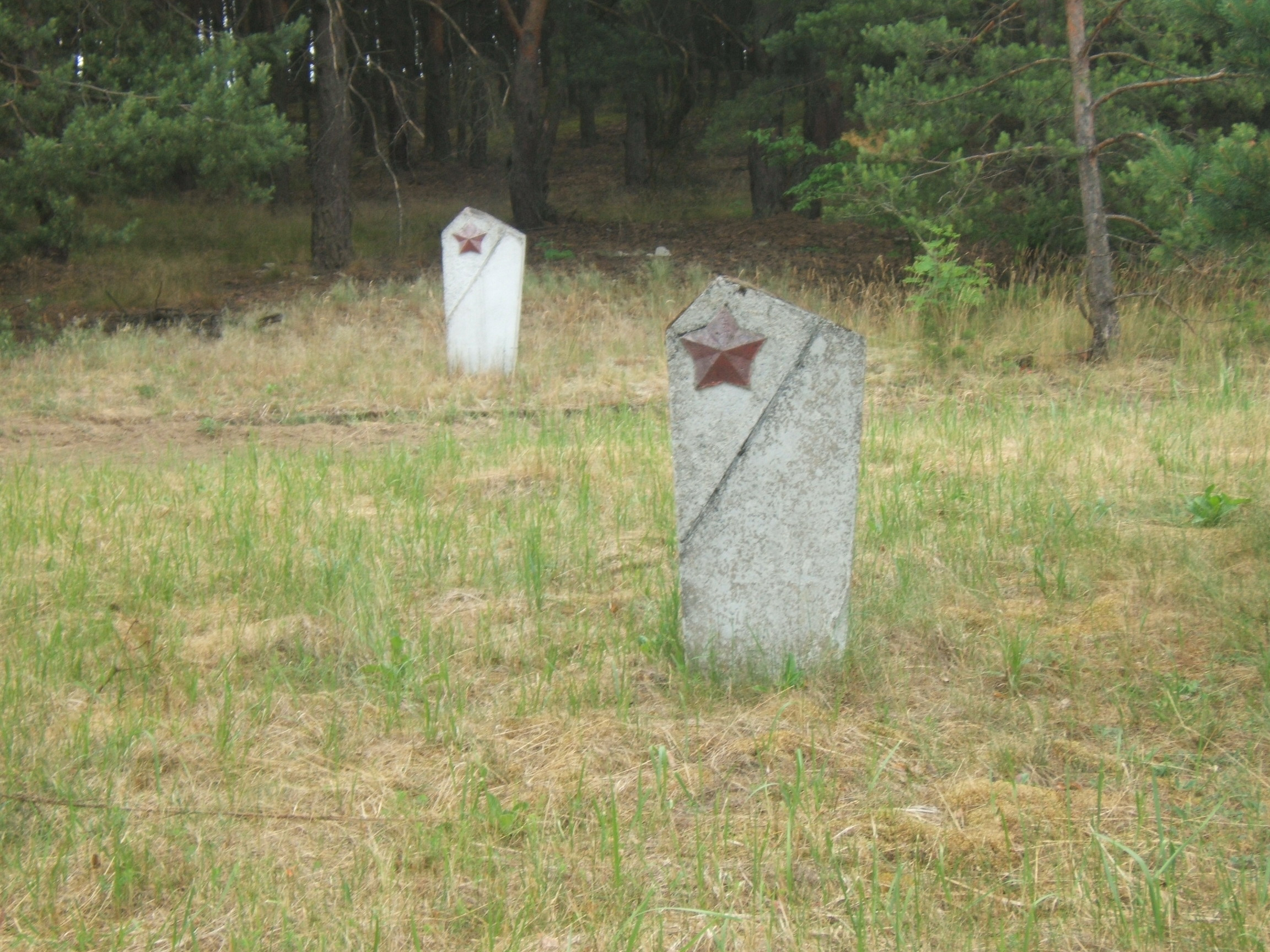
Graves of Soviet prisoners of war at the Nazi POW camp in Glinki, Toruń

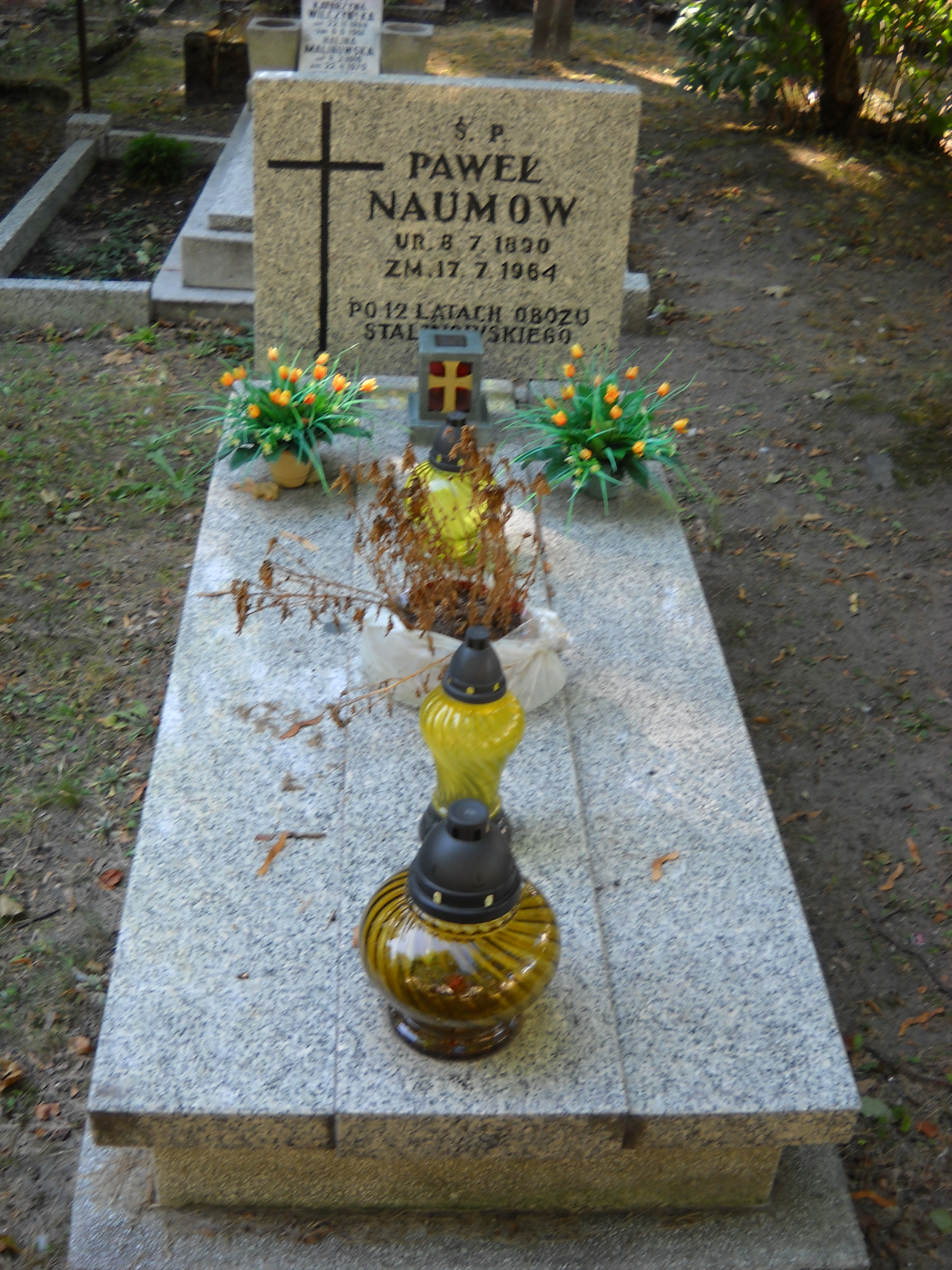
Grave of Pavel Naumov, a pre-war activist of the Orthodox Brotherhood in Toruń and a prisoner of Stalinist camps, at the garrison cemetery in Toruń

During World War II, the existing POW camp in Toruń was expanded in 1941 to include a section designated for captured soldiers of the Red Army. These prisoners were confined in an area near the Toruń-Bydgoszcz railway line in the Glinki district, housed in barracks or in dugouts they excavated themselves. The Soviet prisoners were subjected to forced labor in and around Toruń for between 10 and 12 hours daily. Combined with the camp's appalling sanitary conditions, this led to an exceptionally high mortality rate among the inmates. A total of 14,219 prisoners died in the camp, which operated until January 1945. They were buried in mass graves in the forest near the road to Cierpice. Today, the cemetery for these soldiers has been maintained, and a monument was erected at its entrance in 1969.

During the war, a group of refugees from the Soviet Union, including Russians, also reached Pomerania, including Toruń. After the war, the Soviet authorities pursued their repatriation vigorously. Between late 1945 and early 1946, 49 such individuals were in Toruń, though their nationalities were not specified. Most were forcibly repatriated. By 1951, however, 18 Russians who had arrived during the war remained in Toruń, having gone through the full process to obtain Polish citizenship.

After the Red Army entered Toruń, Russians associated with the white émigré were particularly vulnerable to persecution. According to historian Mirosław Golon, about 30 Russians and Ukrainians were deported from Toruń, accounting for nearly one-third of all Russian deportations from Pomerania. Some of those deported may have returned from the camps, though statistical data on their fate is unavailable. Among those deported who did not return to Toruń were the Orthodox parish priest, Father Vyacheslav Rafalski, and his daughter Natalia.

A document from the Toruń Security Service listed 11 Russians from Toruń deemed disloyal to the Soviet authorities and the new Polish government. According to M. Golon, this assessment may have been based on their remaining in Poland during the interwar period and their activities at that time. Despite these persecutions, documents from the Security Service confirm that the Russian minority maintained positive relations with Poles even after the war.

In the post-war years, detailed statistics on the number of individuals of specific nationalities in Toruń were not collected. In August 1945, the number of residents of non-Polish and non-German nationalities in Toruń was recorded at 121. This figure included Russians, as well as smaller numbers of Ukrainians and Belarusians. By 1948, the Russian population in the Pomeranian Voivodeship was estimated at 301, with most residing in larger cities like Toruń, Włocławek, Bydgoszcz, and Gdańsk – reflecting pre-war trends. The only more detailed data for Toruń was compiled in 1960 by the County National Council, which reported 28 Russians living in the Toruń area.

The deportations, arrests, and efforts to remain hidden disrupted the previous way of life for the Russian minority. M. Golon notes, however, that compared to other Pomeranian towns (excluding Gdańsk), the Russian community in Toruń was relatively well-organized, aided by the survival of the Orthodox parish. Pre-war associations, however, did not resume their activities.

The presence of Russian emigrants in Toruń is evidenced by Orthodox burial plots in the garrison cemetery (now Municipal Cemetery No. 1) and the St. George Cemetery. Additionally, graves of Red Army soldiers who died in the Toruń region in 1945 or were taken prisoner and subsequently died can be found in the Garrison Cemetery and Municipal Cemetery No. 2.

== See also ==
- Ukrainians in Toruń

== Bibliography ==
- Golon, Mirosław (1998). "Żydzi, Ukraińcy, Rosjanie, Białorusini i Cyganie na Pomorzu Gdańskim po II wojnie światowej" [Jews, Ukrainians, Russians, Belarusians, and Gypsies in Gdańsk Pomerania After World War II]. In Wojciechowski, M. (ed.). Mniejszości narodowe i wyznaniowe na Pomorzu w XIX i XX wieku [National and Religious Minorities in Pomerania in the 19th and 20th Centuries] (in Polish). Toruń: Wydawnictwo Uniwersytetu Mikołaja Kopernika. ISBN 83-231-0894-3.
- Karpus, Zbigniew (1983). "Emigracja rosyjska i ukraińska w Toruniu w okresie międzywojennym" [Russian and Ukrainian Emigration in Toruń during the Interwar Period]. Rocznik Toruński (in Polish). 16.
- Karpus, Zbigniew (1998). "Rosjanie i Ukraińcy na Pomorzu w latach 1920-1939" [Russians and Ukrainians in Pomerania from 1920 to 1939]. In Wojciechowski, M. (ed.). Mniejszości narodowe i wyznaniowe na Pomorzu w XIX i XX wieku [National and Religious Minorities in Pomerania in the 19th and 20th Centuries] (in Polish). Toruń: Wydawnictwo Uniwersytetu Mikołaja Kopernika. ISBN 83-231-0894-3.
- Karpus, Zbigniew (1993). "Rosjanie i Ukraińcy w Toruniu w latach 1920-1939" [Russians and Ukrainians in Toruń from 1920 to 1939]. In Wojciechowski, M. (ed.). Mniejszości narodowe i wyznaniowe w Toruniu w XIX i XX wieku [National and Religious Minorities in Pomerania in the 19th and 20th Centuries] (in Polish). Toruń: Wydawnictwo Uniwersytetu Mikołaja Kopernika. ISBN 83-231-0456-5.
