= Ukrainians in Toruń =

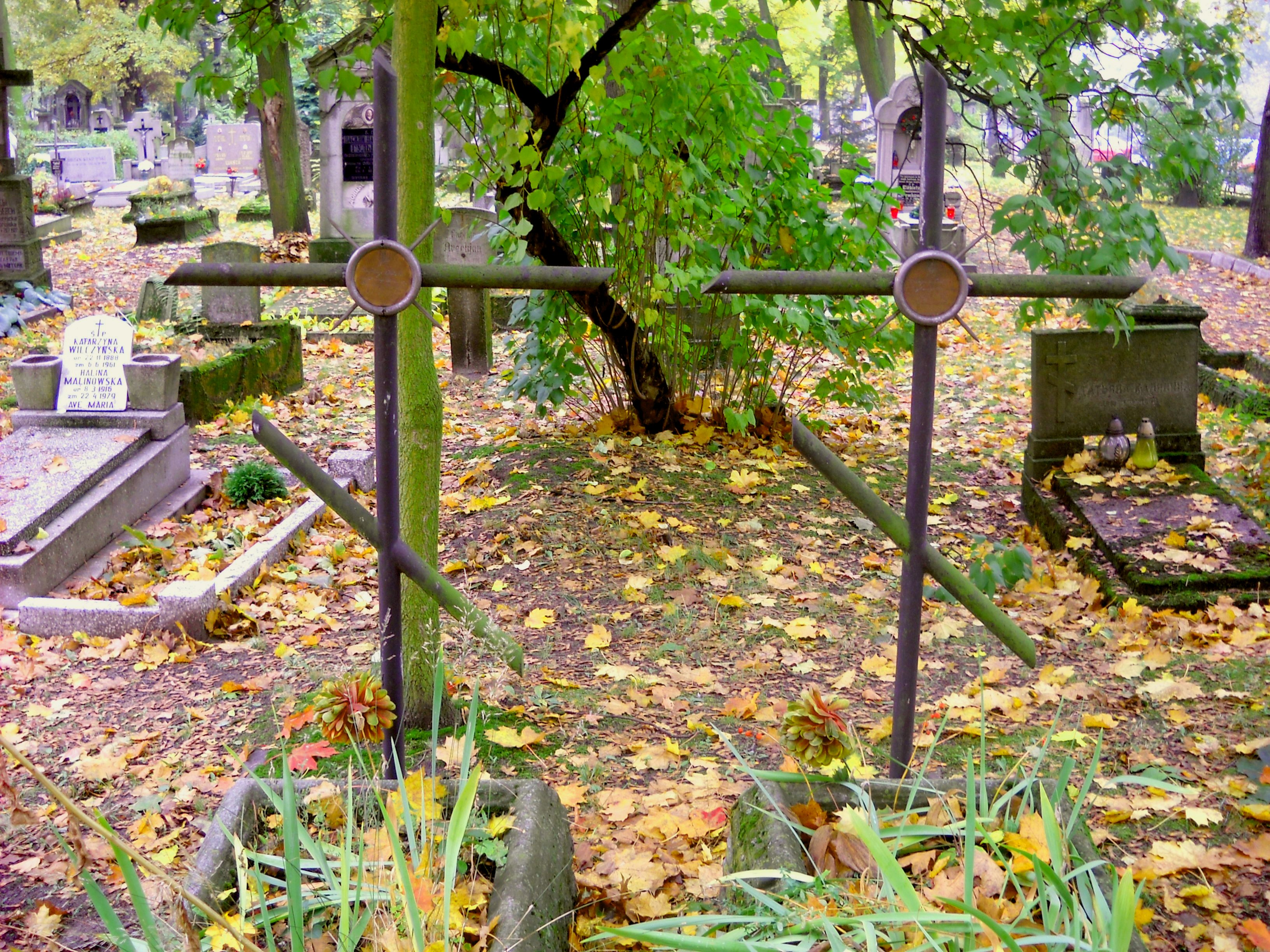
Graves of Ukrainians – Colonel Volodymyr Chahyn and Private Hryhoriy Ochota – are located at the military cemetery in Toruń on Grudziądzka Street

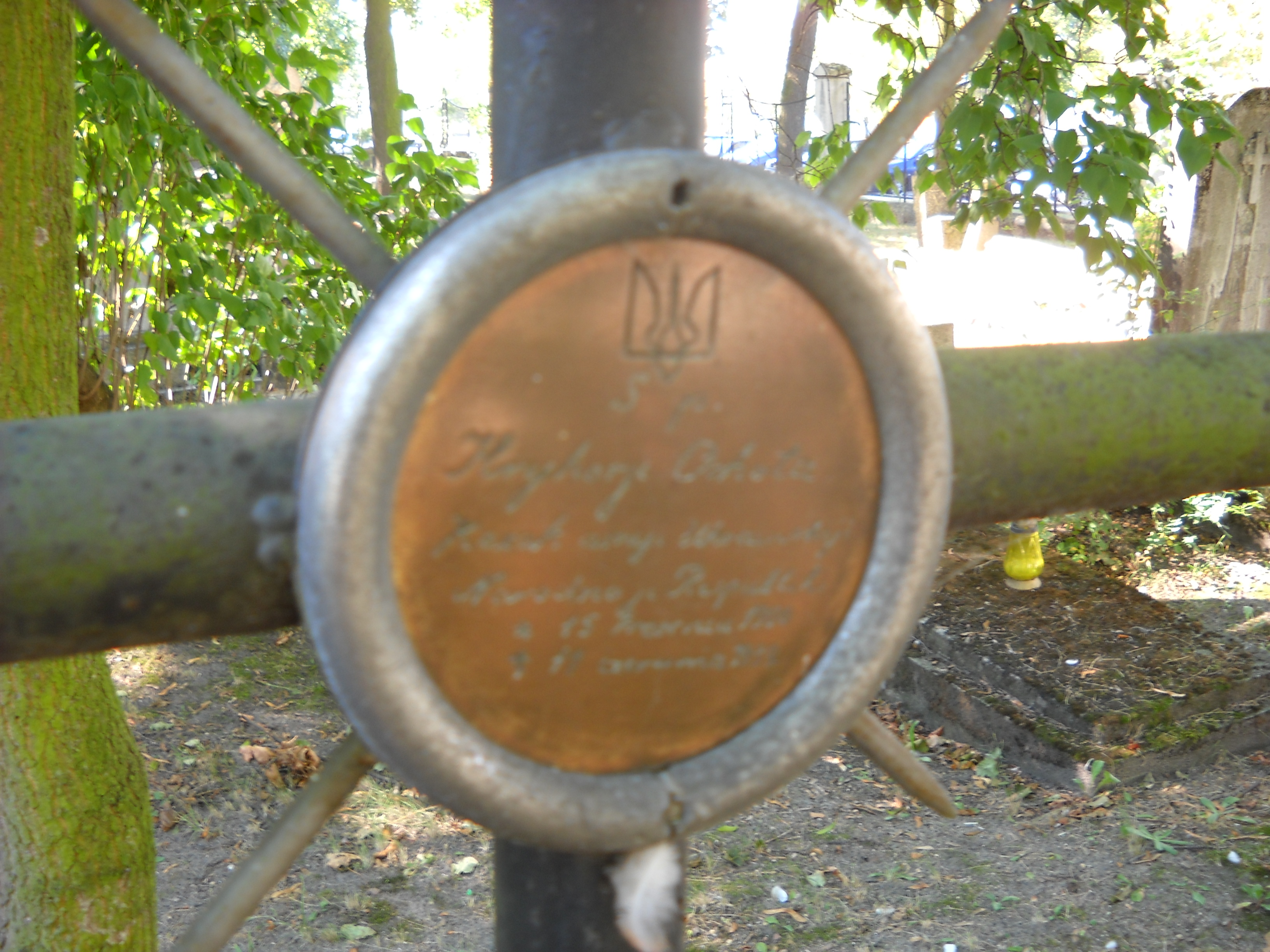
National symbol of Ukraine – the trident (tryzub) – is featured on a gravestone at the military cemetery in Toruń

Ukrainians are a national group present in Toruń since the interwar period. It consisted of former soldiers of the Ukrainian People's Republic, interned in Poland after the signing of the Treaty of Riga. After being released from the camps, some decided to settle permanently in Toruń. The second group of Ukrainians who arrived in Toruń during this period were citizens of Ukrainian nationality, mostly from Galicia. The Ukrainian community was well-integrated, and despite its small size (around 50 people), it was active in cultural activities and participated in the life of the local Orthodox parish. A separate group consisted of a small community of Ukrainian anarchists who arrived in Toruń with their leader, Nestor Makhno.

After World War II, Ukrainians, like the Russians living in Toruń, became targets of repression by the Security Service. As a result, their community did not revive in its former shape.

== Interwar period ==
The first group of Ukrainians arrived in Toruń after the closure of the internment camps for soldiers and officers of the Ukrainian People's Republic, which had been established following the signing of the Treaty of Riga. These were mostly former internees from camps in Strzałkowo and Aleksandrów Kujawski. The first numerical data regarding Ukrainians dates back to 1927, indicating that around 40 individuals of this nationality were permanently residing in Toruń. The number of Ukrainians fluctuated more significantly than that of the emerging Russian community, but eventually stabilized at between 40 and 50 people, mostly men working in free professions.

On 22 July 1924, the registration of foreign nationals of Russian and Ukrainian nationality began in the city. They were required to declare their intention to remain in Poland or leave. Ignoring the registration order was associated with expulsion from the territory of the Second Polish Republic.

Date	Number of Ukrainians
May 1927	~40
December 1929	50
May 1930	42
December 1928	100
January 1931	31
September 1931	30
August 1932	56
1937	55

The number was approximately twice as high when including those of Ukrainian nationality who held Polish citizenship before 1924. Ukrainians with Polish citizenship were mostly employed in government offices. The informal leader of this group was W. Zathaj.

== Social organizations ==
=== Cultural and social activities ===
Although Ukrainians settled in other cities in Pomerania after World War I, they were most organized in Toruń. In 1927, Wiktor Łotocki, a representative of the Central Ukrainian Committee based in Warsaw, arrived in the city. His mission was to establish a branch of the committee in Toruń, a proposal to which the city authorities agreed. The organizational meeting took place at the private residence of a Ukrainian, J. Melnik, located at 13 Sobieski Street. During this meeting, the branch's board was established, consisting of Michał Kaszczuk as president, Włodzimierz Czagin as treasurer, and Antoni Ptasznik as secretary.

The branch engaged in charitable work, providing material support to impoverished Ukrainians in the Toruń district, offering legal advice, and conducting cultural activities. Its funding came from membership fees and allocations from the Central Ukrainian Committee; in 1927, the organization received 1,500 PLN. As part of its cultural endeavors, the Toruń branch of the Central Ukrainian Committee created a choir, a drama troupe, an amateur ballet group, and a Ukrainian-language library. Ukrainians organized public performances and concerts, with proceeds directed to support their less fortunate compatriots in Toruń. The organization also established traditions such as annual Christmas celebrations and New Year's parties for Ukrainian children. At its inception, the association had 40 members. The membership fee was 1.5 PLN monthly, with an additional 50 gr registration fee. The Toruń group maintained especially close ties with the Lviv branch.

In 1930, the Toruń branch split into two rival factions due to financial disputes. One group was led by J. Sołowjew, while the other rallied around M. Kaszczuk. The immediate cause of the division was an accusation against Kaszczuk of embezzling funds from membership fees. When he refused to resign and disclose the association's records, the organization faced the threat of dissolution, as the Central Ukrainian Committee in Warsaw withdrew financial support. The schism was resolved the following year, with Sołowjew assuming the role of branch chairman. In 1935, he was succeeded by Bazyli Szewczuk.

Ukrainians in Toruń maintained positive relations with both the local Russian community and the Polish population. No instances of anti-state sentiment were recorded among them. Like the Russians, Ukrainians participated in services held at St. Nicholas Orthodox Church to commemorate Polish national holidays. This contributed to reducing local authorities' surveillance of the Ukrainian community. By the late 1930s, Toruń's authorities focused their attention entirely on the German minority, which exhibited a markedly different attitude. The Ukrainian community in Toruń distanced itself from radical Ukrainian nationalism, exemplified by its condemnation of the 1931 assassination of Tadeusz Hołówko.

=== Military activities ===
The organizer of the Toruń branch, Wiktor Łotocki, also established a self-education group composed of former Ukrainian officers and soldiers. The group aimed to enhance its military knowledge through regular courses, preparing for the possibility of a national uprising in Ukraine. Łotocki led these courses until 1934, when he was succeeded by J. Chmara. By that year, the group consisted of 28 members. Polish military authorities were aware of the association's existence.

=== Religious activities ===
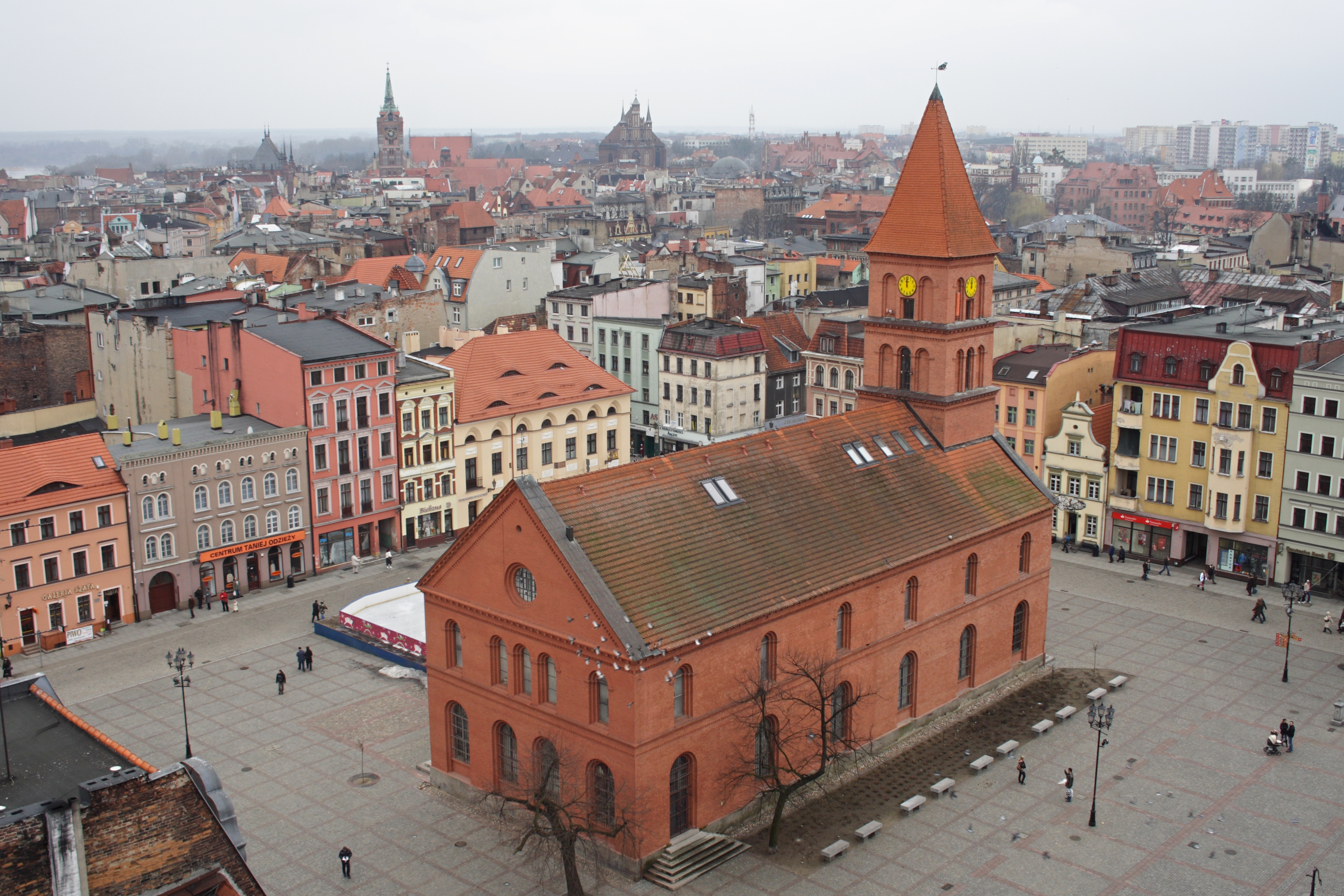
Building of the former Evangelical church on New Town Market Square in Toruń served as a venue for Orthodox services during the interwar period, attended by Ukrainians living in the city

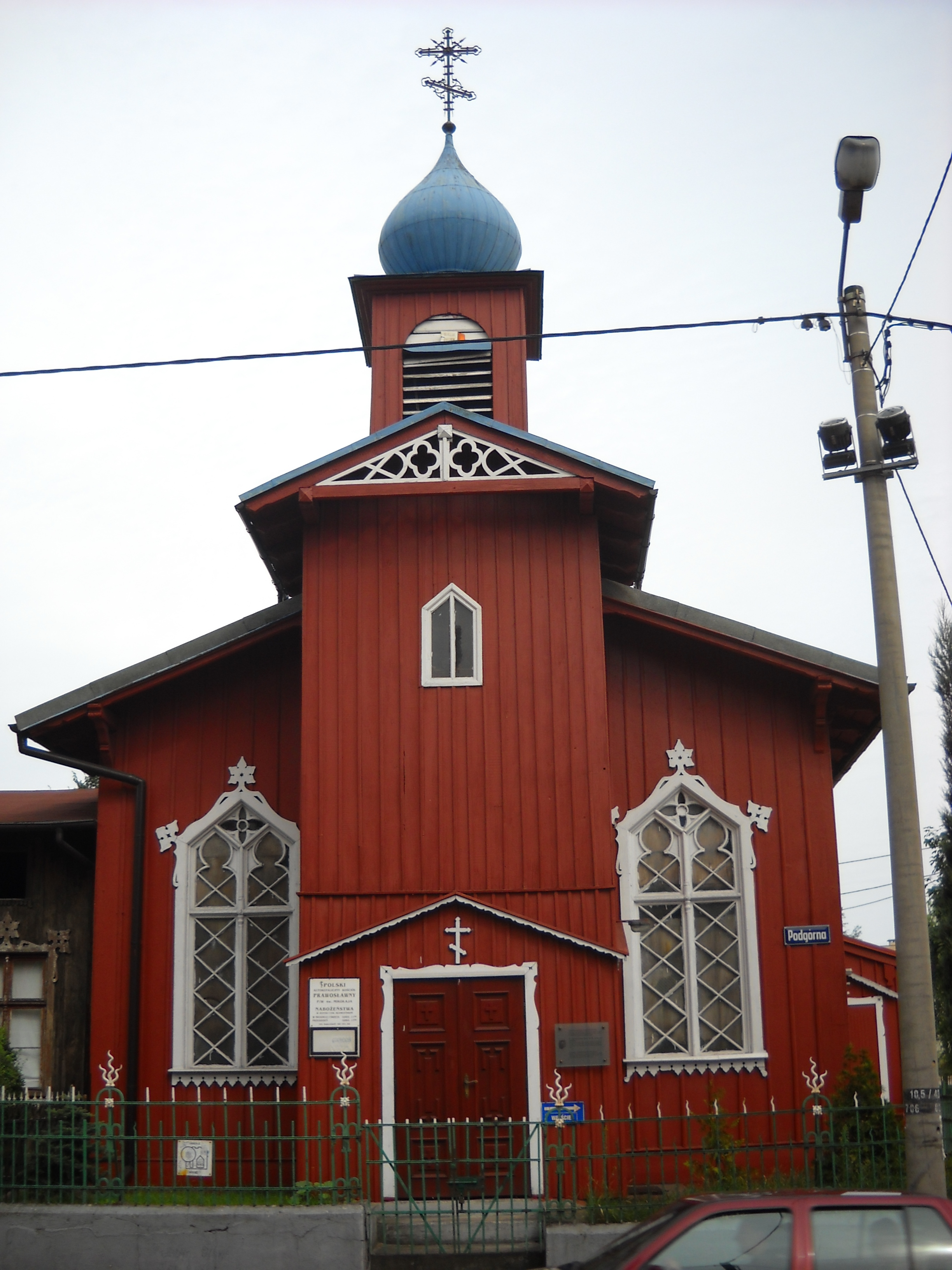
Orthodox Church of St. Nicholas on Podgórna Street

Ukrainians who settled in Toruń after World War I practiced Orthodoxy (those from the former Russian Empire) or Catholicism (Polish citizens). Among the latter, some were members of the Greek Catholic Church, while others followed the Latin rite. In 1935, Ukrainian Greek Catholics attempted to establish their own parish in Toruń, but this effort was thwarted due to a lack of support from Metropolitan Andrey Sheptytsky and opposition from Chełmno Bishop S. Okoniewski.

Since the arrival of Ukrainian internees in Toruń, an Orthodox parish dedicated to St. Nicholas existed, which Ukrainians shared with the Russian community. Initially, the parish operated in the St. Nicholas Chapel within Internment Camp No. 15 until 1924. Afterward, due to the absence of an Orthodox church or chapel, the parish rented various facilities: the Evangelical-Augsburg chapel on Strumykowa Street (from March to October 1922) and the Evangelical-Reformed chapel on Dominikańska Street. On 6 January 1924, the parish acquired the former military chapel of Sanitary Battalion No. 8, which became the parish's official place of worship. This church served Orthodox soldiers stationed in Toruń and emigrants of Russian and Ukrainian origin.

In 1927, the parish obtained the rights to use the former Evangelical Church of the Holy Trinity on New Town Market Square, which was consecrated as the Orthodox Church of St. Nicholas. Its first priest was a Ukrainian, Stefan Rudyk, succeeded by another Ukrainian cleric, Grzegorz Kuryłas. This church remained active until 1939, when it was closed by the Nazi authorities. However, they permitted the establishment of a new Orthodox church, still in operation today, at 69 Podgórna Street in a former Old Lutheran church, retaining the same dedication to St. Nicholas. Until the outbreak of World War II, Ukrainians also maintained a private chapel on Łazienna Street, where services were conducted in Church Slavonic with Ukrainian pronunciation.

On 29 December 1925, the Russian community in Toruń initiated the registration of the Brotherhood of Orthodox Christians. Its proposed statute stipulated that the organization would be open to all Orthodox believers, regardless of nationality, and its formation was subject to the approval of the Metropolitan of Warsaw and all Poland. Municipal authorities registered the Brotherhood on 26 January 1926, and the Warsaw Metropolis granted approval on May 12 that year. At its inaugural meeting on 14 July 1926 at 6 Mostowa Street, the Brotherhood had 104 members.

Although the Brotherhood's founders and leaders were Russian, many Ukrainians also participated. The organization's activities included cultural initiatives such as amateur performances, concerts, lectures, and various gatherings. Membership fees amounted to 1 PLN per month. Despite their collaboration within the Brotherhood, Ukrainians emphasized their distinct national identity, exemplified by an unsuccessful attempt to form a separate Ukrainian brotherhood in 1928. That same year, a mass was celebrated in the Toruń Orthodox church for the repose of Symon Petliura, reflecting the Ukrainian community's widespread support for his political program.

=== Anarchists ===
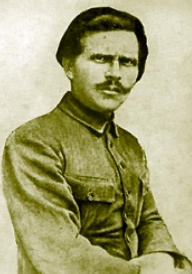
Nestor Makhno

A distinct group, separate from the broader Ukrainian community in Poland, briefly consisted of Ukrainian anarchists who came to Toruń following the enforced relocation of Nestor Makhno, a figure in the anarchist movement. Makhno, who had been residing illegally in Poland since 1922, was ordered to settle in Toruń.

Makhno arrived in the city accompanied by his wife Halyna, their child, his adjutant J. Chmara, and a small group of followers. Initially, he resided at the Mazowiecki Hotel before moving to a house at 29 Sienkiewicz Street. However, Makhno viewed his stay in Toruń – and in Poland more broadly – as temporary. Shortly after settling, he applied for permission to leave for Germany, but his visa request was denied.

During his time in Toruń, Makhno's mental state deteriorated. He attempted suicide and had to change residences twice due to assassination attempts by unknown assailants. Finally, on 2 July 1924, Makhno left Toruń for Gdańsk. Throughout his stay in Toruń, he was under surveillance by military intelligence.

=== Ukrainian soldiers ===
In addition to civilian Ukrainians who settled permanently, Toruń was also home to Ukrainian soldiers serving in the Polish army. Following the system of assigning conscripts to units far from their birthplace or previous residence, large groups of Ukrainians, Belarusians, and Jews from Poland's eastern voivodeships were directed to Toruń during the 1922 draft. On April 1 of that year, Ukrainians constituted 0.19% of conscripts in the Toruń-based 8th Corps District (35 individuals). Their numbers increased significantly in subsequent years, reaching over 6% of all conscripts by 28 February 1923. A report for the Independent Information Office of the 8th Corps District described Ukrainian conscripts as follows:

The influence of military service is positive, but not to the extent seen among Belarusians. A strong political and agitational mindset, coupled with national awareness, poses obstacles that are difficult to overcome. However, persistent efforts and the aforementioned conditions yield positive results in fostering their attitude toward the State.

The majority of Ukrainian soldiers hailed from Eastern Galicia. Serving in locations far from their birthplace was intended to instill a sense of loyalty toward the Polish state. The deputy commander of the 8th Corps District recommended to the Ministry of Military Affairs that targeted efforts be made to assimilate and foster loyalty among minority groups, including Ukrainians, within districts such as Toruń. These efforts were often tied to general education initiatives, as many conscripts from Poland's eastern regions were illiterate upon entering service. However, after 1924, Ukrainians were much less frequently assigned to Toruń. By 1933, only 45 Ukrainians were recorded in the 8th Corps District.

== Situation of Ukrainians after World War II ==
The attitude of Ukrainians living in Toruń toward the outbreak of World War II and the Nazi occupation of the city has not yet been thoroughly studied or documented. Emilian Wiszka references only the account of S. Dmytrenko regarding the arrest and shooting of W. Łotocki by the SS in 1945 after Ukrainians removed posters from their premises on Łazienna Street. These posters, imposed by the occupying authorities, encouraged cooperation in fighting the advancing Red Army.

During the war, additional groups of Russians, Belarusians, and Ukrainians arrived in Toruń, fleeing from the Eastern Borderlands. The exact size of this group remains undetermined, though a significant portion was forced to relocate to the Soviet Union immediately after Toruń's liberation. Moreover, around 30 Russians and Ukrainians were deported to labor camps following the Red Army's arrival in the city.

The fact that Ukrainians and Russians did not face severe repression under Nazi rule prompted the NKVD to scrutinize their political stances, both before and during the war. This led to the creation of a list of 11 individuals from Toruń of Russian, Ukrainian, and Belarusian origin who were deemed "hostile toward Poles". In reality, these evaluations were heavily influenced by the individuals' prior anti-communist or anti-Soviet activities. A report from the head of the Provincial Office of Public Security's First Department in September 1945 categorized all Russians and Ukrainians as adversaries of "the current state representatives and the Democratic Government".

All Ukrainians who had arrived in Pomerania during the war were classified as subject to repatriation. However, voluntary compliance with repatriation orders was rare. Most Ukrainians, like other ethnic minorities from the Soviet Union, avoided designated assembly points, opting instead to hide or flee to other regions of Poland. In 1945, the total number of Slavic minority members in Toruń was recorded at 121. By 1946, the Ukrainian population in the Toruń district had decreased to 34 individuals, with 21 residing in the city itself.

The presence of Ukrainian emigrants in Toruń is marked by a few graves in the Orthodox sections of the city's cemeteries. These include the Garrison Cemetery (now Municipal Cemetery No. 1) and St. George's Cemetery. Emilian Wiszka notes that, in 1934, the graves of Colonel Oleksa Łuszczenko, Colonel Volodymyr Chahyn, and Private Hryhoriy Okhota existed at the Garrison Cemetery. These graves were cared for by the Ukrainian community, which funded new monuments for them that year. However, these did not survive World War II. In 1998, new Orthodox crosses were erected over the burial sites of H. Okhota and W. Chahyn, thanks to E. Wiszka's initiative. The burial locations of other Ukrainians at the cemetery remain unknown.

== Bibliography ==
- Golon, Mirosław (1998). "Żydzi, Ukraińcy, Rosjanie, Białorusini i Cyganie na Pomorzu Gdańskim po II wojnie światowej" [Jews, Ukrainians, Russians, Belarusians, and Roma in the Gdańsk Pomerania After World War II]. In Wojciechowski, M. (ed.). Mniejszości narodowe i wyznaniowe na Pomorzu w XIX i XX wieku [National and Religious Minorities in Pomerania in the 19th and 20th Centuries] (in Polish). Toruń: Wydawnictwo Uniwersytetu Mikołaja Kopernika. ISBN 83-231-0894-3.
- Karpus, Zbigniew (1983). "Emigracja rosyjska i ukraińska w Toruniu w okresie międzywojennym" [Russian and Ukrainian Emigration in Toruń During the Interwar Period]. Rocznik Toruński (in Polish). 16.
- Karpus, Zbigniew (1993). "Rosjanie i Ukraińcy w Toruniu w latach 1920-1939" [Russians and Ukrainians in Toruń from 1920 to 1939]. In Wojciechowski, M. (ed.). Mniejszości narodowe i wyznaniowe w Toruniu w XIX i XX wieku [National and Religious Minorities in Pomerania in the 19th and 20th Centuries] (in Polish). Toruń: Wydawnictwo Uniwersytetu Mikołaja Kopernika. ISBN 83-231-0456-5.
- Rezmer, Waldemar (1998). "Problematyka narodowościowa i wyznaniowa w wojsku na terenie Dowództwa Okręgu Korpusu nr VIII w Toruniu (1920–1939)" [Ethnic and Religious Issues in the Military within the Area of the 8th Corps District Command in Toruń (1920–1939)]. In Wojciechowski, M. (ed.). Mniejszości narodowe i wyznaniowe na Pomorzu w XIX i XX wieku [National and Religious Minorities in Pomerania in the 19th and 20th Centuries] (in Polish). Toruń: Wydawnictwo Uniwersytetu Mikołaja Kopernika. ISBN 83-231-0894-3.
- Wiszka, Emilian (2005). Emigracja ukraińska w Polsce 1920–1939 [Ukrainian Emigration in Poland 1920–1939] (in Polish). Toruń: MADO. ISBN 83-89886-08-1.
