= Golon =

Golon is a surname. Notable people with the surname include:

- Anne Golon (1921–2017), French author
- MaryAnne Golon (born 1960), American photojournalist
- Mirosław Golon (born 1964), Polish historian
- Serge Golon (1903–1972), Russian-born French geochemist, writer, and artist
