= Treaty of Riga =

1921 treaty which ended the Polish-Soviet War

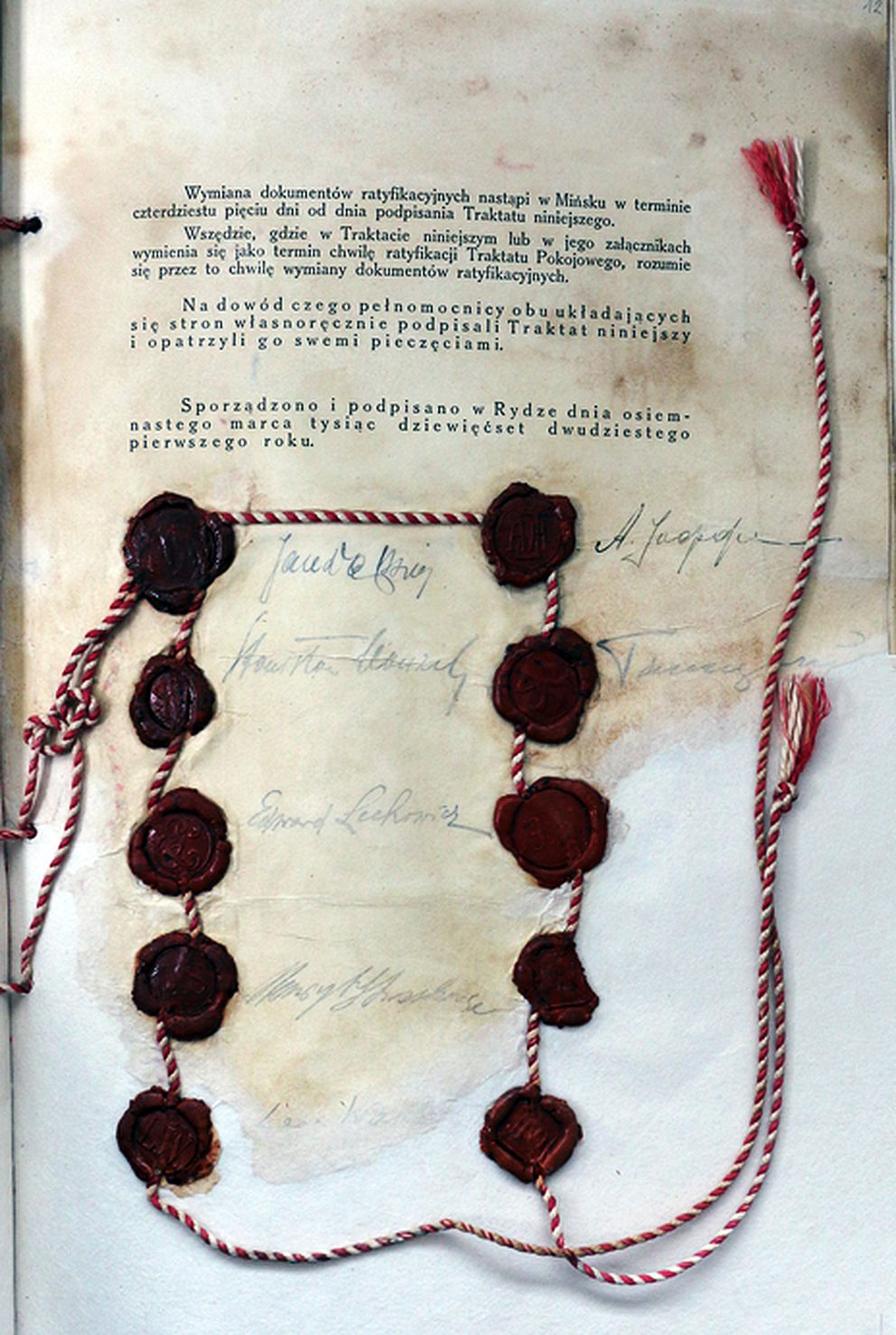
- Signed: 18 March 1921
- Location: Riga, Latvia
- Ratified: (Second Polish Republic) 15 April 1921 (Russian Soviet Federative Socialist Republic) 14 April 1921 (Ukrainian Soviet Socialist Republic) 17 April 1921
- Expiration: 17 September 1939
- Parties: Poland; Soviet Russia; (Ukrainian Soviet Socialist Republic) Soviet Ukraine
- Ratifiers: Sejm Russian Soviet; Ukrainian Soviet

The Treaty of Riga was signed in Riga, Latvia, on 18 March 1921 between Poland on one side and Soviet Russia (acting also on behalf of Soviet Belarus) and Soviet Ukraine on the other, ending the Polish–Soviet War (1919–1921). The chief negotiators of the peace were Jan Dąbski for the Polish side and Adolph Joffe for the Soviet side.

Under the treaty, Poland recognized Soviet Ukraine and Belarus, abrogating its 1920 Treaty of Warsaw with the Ukrainian People's Republic. The Treaty of Riga established a Polish–Soviet border about 250 kilometres (160 mi) east of the Curzon Line, incorporating large numbers of Ukrainians and Belarusians into the Second Polish Republic. Poland, which agreed to withdraw from areas further east (notably Minsk), renounced claims to the Polish–Lithuanian Commonwealth's border prior to the 1772 First Partition of Poland, recovering only those eastern regions (Kresy) lost to Russia in the 1795 Third Partition. Russia and Soviet Ukraine agreed to withdraw their claims to lands west of the demarcated border line. Poland, by recognising the Bolshevik-controlled Ukrainian and Belarusian states and simultaneously withdrawing recognition of the UPR (its only ally in the Polish–Bolshevik war), was in fact giving up on the federation programme, while Russia agreed to the whole of Galicia, as well as the territories of the former Russian Empire, inhabited largely by non-Polish people, being found within Poland's borders. The treaty also addressed matters of sovereignty, citizenship, national minorities, repatriation, and diplomatic and commercial relations. The Treaty lasted until the invasion of Poland by the Soviet Union in 1939, and their borders were redefined by an agreement in 1945.

== Background ==
World War I removed former state borders across Europe. Following the Russian Revolution which had renounced Tsarist claims to Poland, as well as the Central Powers provisions for Congress Poland in the March 1918 Treaty of Brest-Litovsk, The Great War had ended with the collapse of the Central Powers. The Treaty of Versailles had re-established Poland's independence after a century and a half of being divided by three empires.

The Russian Civil War presented an opportunity for Poland, under the leadership of Józef Piłsudski, to regain parts of the territories of the former Polish–Lithuanian Commonwealth that had been incorporated into the Russian Empire during the Partitions of Poland–Lithuania. In 1920, Piłsudski's initially successful military offensive into Ukraine, whose aim was to establish an independent Ukraine in alliance with Poland, was met with a Soviet counter-offensive into central Poland. Poland was seen by the Soviets, who intended to extend the revolution westwards, as a land bridge to Western Europe. The Polish–Soviet War culminated in the Battle of Warsaw, won by the Poles. Further military setbacks persuaded Soviet Russia to enter into peace treaty negotiations. This was a relief for the government of Poland, a country heavily damaged and exhausted by the war, who also wanted to conclude peace talks. Piłsudski and his supporters, however, having failed in their quest, opposed the peace process.

== Negotiations ==
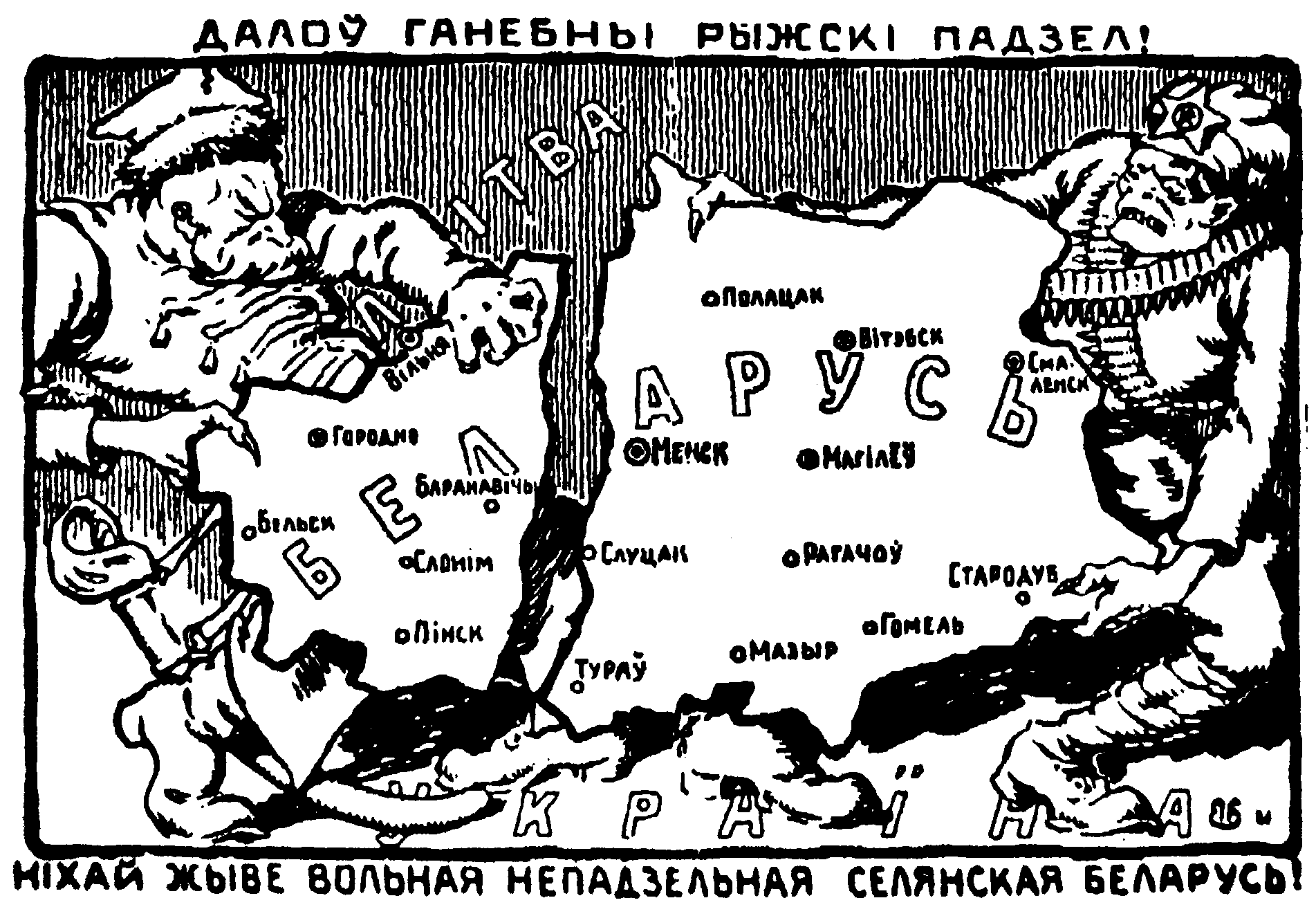
Belarusian nationalist caricature showing Poland and the Bolsheviks partitioning Belarus: "Down with the infamous Riga partition! Long live a free peasant indivisible Belarus!"

Peace talks began in Minsk on 17 August 1920, but the talks were moved to Riga, and resumed on 21 September. The Soviets proposed two solutions, the first on 21 September and the second on 28 September. The Polish delegation made a counter-offer on 2 October. Three days later the Soviets offered amendments to the Polish offer, which Poland accepted. An armistice was signed on 12 October and went into effect on 18 October 1920. The chief negotiators were Jan Dąbski for Poland and Adolph Joffe for the Russian Soviet Federative Socialist Republic. The Soviet side insisted, successfully, on excluding non-communist Ukrainian representatives from the negotiations.

The Soviets' military setbacks made their delegation offer Poland substantial territorial concessions in the contested border areas. However, to many observers, it looked as though the Polish side conducted the Riga talks as if Poland had lost the war. The Polish delegation was dominated by members of the National Democrats, who were Piłsudski's political opponents. The National Democrats did not want non-Polish minorities in the reborn Polish state to constitute more than one-third of the overall population, therefore, prepared to accept a Polish-Soviet border substantially to the west of what was being offered by the Soviets even though it would leave hundreds of thousands of ethnic Poles on the Soviet side of the border.

That decision was also motivated by political objectives. The National Democrats' base of public support was among Poles in central and western Poland. In the east of the country and in the disputed borderlands, support for the National Democrats was greatly outweighed by support for Piłsudski, and in the countryside, outside the cities, Poles were outnumbered by Ukrainians or Belarusians in those areas. A border too far to the east would thus be against not only the National Democrats' ideological objective of minimising the minority population of Poland but also their electoral prospects. Warweary public opinion in Poland also favoured an end to the negotiations, and both sides remained under pressure from the League of Nations to reach a deal.

A special parliamentary delegation, consisting of six members of the Polish Sejm, held a vote on whether to accept the Soviets' far-reaching concessions, which would have left Minsk on the Polish side of the border. Pressured by the National Democrat ideologue, Stanisław Grabski, the 100 km of extra territory was rejected, a victory for the nationalist doctrine and a stark defeat for Piłsudski's federalism.

Regardless, the peace negotiations dragged on for months because of Soviet reluctance to sign. However, the matter became more urgent for the Soviet leadership, which had to deal with increased internal unrest towards the end of 1920, such as the Tambov Rebellion and later the Kronstadt rebellion against the Soviet authorities. As a result, Vladimir Lenin ordered the Soviet plenipotentiaries to finalise the peace treaty with Poland.

The Treaty of Riga, signed on 18 March 1921, partitioned the disputed territories in Belarus and Ukraine between Poland and Russia and ended the conflict.

== Terms ==
The Treaty consisted of 26 articles. Poland was to receive monetary compensation (30 million rubles in gold) for its economic input into the Russian Empire during the Partitions of Poland. Under Article 14 Poland was also to receive railway materials (locomotives, rolling stock, etc.) with a value of 29 million gold roubles. Russia was to surrender works of art and other Polish national treasures acquired from Polish territories after 1772 (such as the Jagiellonian tapestries and the Załuski Library). Both sides renounced claims to war compensation. Article 3 stipulated that border issues between Poland and Lithuania would be settled by those states.

TREATY OF PEACE BETWEEN POLAND, RUSSIA AND THE UKRAINE
Riga, March 18, 1921
Article 3. Russia and the Ukraine abandon all rights and claims to the territories situated to the west of the frontier laid down by Article 2 of the present Treaty. Poland, on the other hand, abandons in favour of the Ukraine and of White Ruthenia all rights and claims to the territory situated to the east of this frontier.
Article 4. Each of the Contracting Parties mutually undertakes to respect in every way the political sovereignty of the other Party, to abstain from interference in its internal affairs, and particularly to refrain from all agitation, propaganda or interference of any kind, and not to encourage any such movement.

Article 6 created citizenship options for persons on either side of the new border. Article 7 consisted of a mutual guarantee that all nationalities would be permitted "free intellectual development, the use of their national language, and the exercise of their religion." In the treaty, it was agreed that Poland would refuse to form federations with Lithuania, Belarus and Ukraine.

== Aftermath ==
The Allied Powers were initially reluctant to recognise the treaty, which had been concluded without their participation. Their postwar conferences had supported the Curzon Line as the Polish-Russian border, and Poland's territorial gains in the treaty lay about 250 km east of that line. French support led to its recognition in March 1923 by France, the United Kingdom, Italy and Japan, followed by the United States in April.

In Poland, the Treaty of Riga was met with criticism from the very beginning. Some characterised the treaty as short-sighted and argued that much of what Poland had gained during the Polish-Soviet war was lost during the peace negotiations. Józef Piłsudski had participated in the Riga negotiations only as an observer and called the resulting treaty "an act of cowardice". Piłsudski felt the agreement was a shameless and short-sighted political calculation, with Poland abandoning its Ukrainian allies. On 15 May 1921, he apologised to Ukrainian soldiers during his visit to the internment camp at Kalisz. The treaty substantially contributed to the failure of his plan to create a Polish-led Intermarium federation of Eastern Europe, as portions of the territory that had been proposed for the federation were ceded to the Soviets.

Lenin also considered the treaty unsatisfactory, as it forced him to put aside his plans for exporting the Soviet revolution to the West.

The Belarusian and Ukrainian independence movements saw the treaty as a setback. Four million Ukrainians and over a million Belarusians lived within areas ceded to Poland. In one estimate, only 15% of the population was ethnically Polish. The Ukrainian People's Republic, led by Symon Petliura, had been allied with Poland under the Treaty of Warsaw, which was abrogated by the Treaty of Riga. The new treaty violated Poland's military alliance with the UPR, which had explicitly prohibited a separate peace. Doing so worsened relations between Poland and the Ukrainians who had supported Petliura. The supporters felt that Ukraine had been betrayed by its Polish ally, which would be exploited by the Organization of Ukrainian Nationalists and contribute to the growing tensions and eventual anti-Polish massacres in the 1930s and the 1940s. By the end of 1921, most Poland-allied Ukrainian, Belarusian and White Russian forces had been annihilated by Soviet forces or had crossed the border into Poland and laid down their arms.

According to the Belarusian historian Andrew Savchenko, Poland's new eastern border was "military indefensible and economically unviable" and a source of growing ethnic tensions, as the resulting minorities in Poland were too large to be ignored or assimilated and too small to win their desired autonomy.

== Further consequences ==
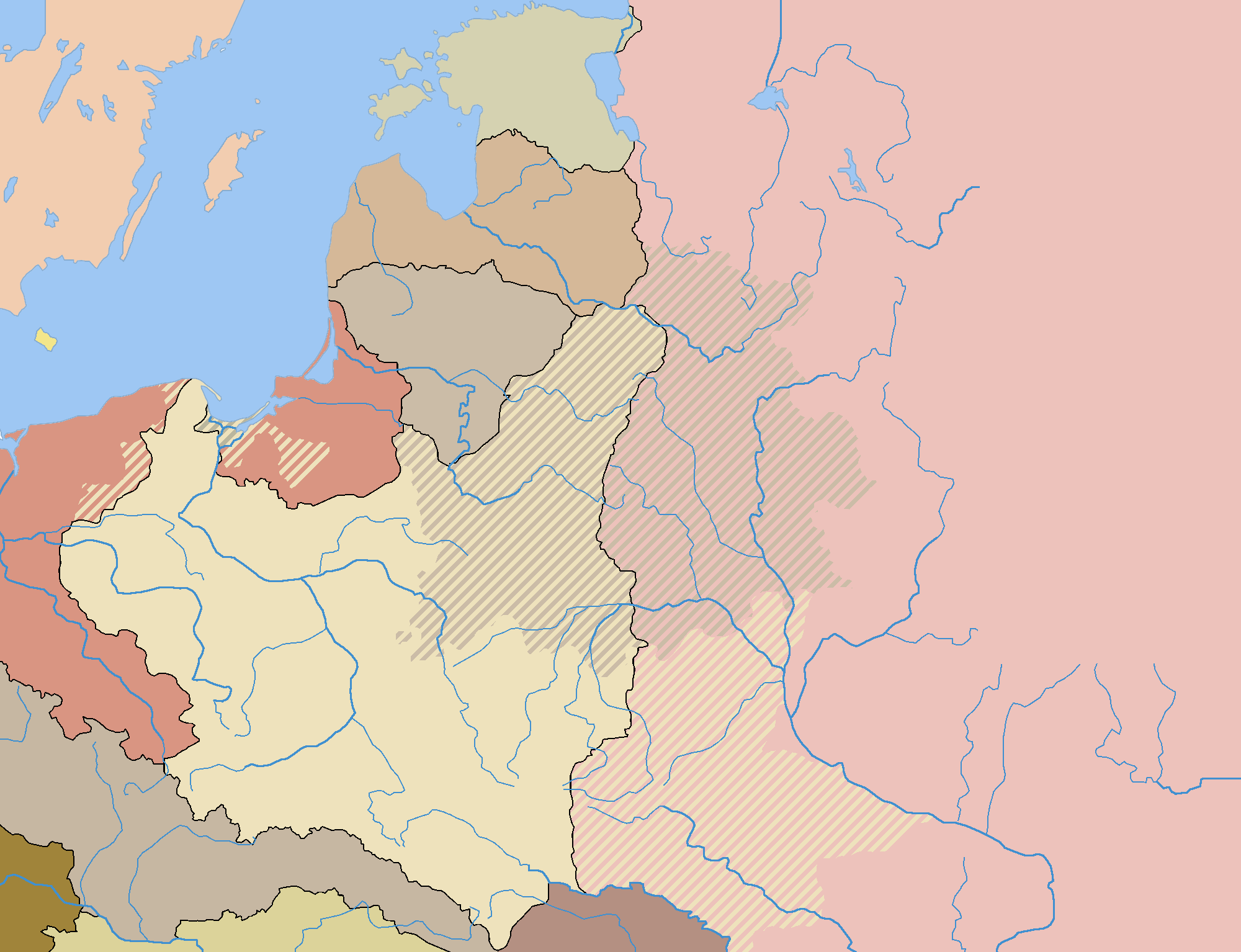
Poland after the Treaty of Riga with the pre-partition borders of the Polish–Lithuanian Commonwealth also indicated

While the Treaty of Riga led to a two-decade stabilisation of Soviet-Polish relations, conflict was renewed with the Soviet invasion of Poland during World War II. The treaty was subsequently overridden after a decision by war's Allied powers to change Poland's borders once again and transfer the populations.

In the view of some foreign observers, the treaty's incorporation of significant minority populations into Poland led to seemingly insurmountable challenges, because the newly formed organizations such as OUN engaged in terror and sabotage actions across ethnically mixed areas to inflame conflict in the region. Nevertheless, many groups representing national minorities welcomed Piłsudski's return to power in 1926 providing opportunities to play a role in the Polish government.

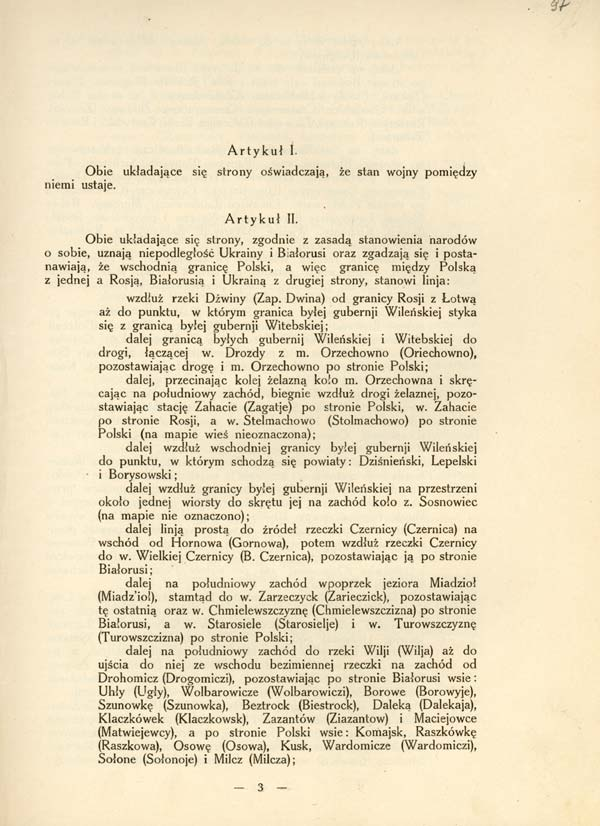
Second page of the treaty, Polish version

The populations separated from Poland by the new Polish-Soviet border experienced a different fate from their fellow citizens. Ethnic Poles left within Soviet borders were subjected to discrimination and property confiscation. At least 111,000 were summarily executed in the NKVD operation in 1937/38, preceding other ethnic repression campaigns perpetrated during World War II, while others were exiled to different regions of the Soviet Union.

Belarusians and Ukrainians, having failed to create their own states, were subjects of repression in the Soviet Union, and even liquidation e.g. Executed Renaissance or persecuted kobzars and bandurists. Belarusians and Ukrainians living on the Polish side of the border were subjected to Polonization; which contributed to the rise of Ukrainian nationalist organisations and the adoption of terrorist tactics by Ukrainian extremists.

The Soviet Union, although thwarted in 1921, would see its sphere of influence expand as a result of World War II. After the Soviet Union established its control over the People's Republic of Poland, the Polish-Soviet border was moved westwards in 1945 to roughly coincide with the Curzon Line. This shift was accompanied by large population transfers which led to the expulsion of the Poles living east of the new border, and also moved most of the Ukrainian minority remaining in Poland to the former German territories that were ceded to Poland in compensation. The unified Belarusian and Ukrainian territories were fully incorporated into the USSR.

However, in 1989, Poland would regain its full sovereignty, and soon afterwards, with the fall of the Soviet Union, Belarus and Ukraine would go on to become independent nations.

== See also ==
- Poles in the Soviet Union
- Belarusians in Poland
- Ukrainians in Poland
- Byelorussian Soviet Socialist Republic
- Ukrainian Soviet Socialist Republic
- Aftermath of the Polish–Soviet War
- Polish Operation of the NKVD
- Latvian–Soviet Peace Treaty
- Soviet–Lithuanian Peace Treaty
- Treaty of Tartu (Estonia–Russia)
- Treaty of Tartu (Finland–Russia)
- Ukrainians in Toruń
- Russians in Toruń
