= Zbigniew Karpus =

Polish historian and professor

Zbigniew Klemens Karpus (born 1954) is a Polish historian. Professor of Nicolaus Copernicus University in Toruń, where he is the director of Institute of International Relations, he is the author of several books and dozens of articles. He specialized in the relations between Poland and her eastern neighbours (Russia, Ukraine and others).

Among the specific areas of his interests is the fate of prisoners of war during the Polish-Soviet War, history of the political emigrés from Russia to Poland in the Second Polish Republic, history of interwar Pomorze and Kujawy and their local Jewish communities.

== Selected publications ==
- Tuchola. Obóz jeńców i internowanych 1914-1923
- Polska i Ukraina. Sojusz 1920 roku i jego następstwa
- Jeńcy i internowani rosyjscy i ukraińscy na terenie Polski w latach 1918-1924 (doctoral thesis)
- Zwycięzcy za drutami. Jeńcy polscy w niewoli (1919–1922). Dokumenty i materiały
- Wschodni sojusznicy Polski w wojnie 1920 roku.

== See also ==
- Camps for Russian prisoners and internees in Poland (1919–1924)
