= New Town Market Square, Toruń =

Square in Toruń, Poland

Coordinates: 53°00′42″N 18°36′40″E

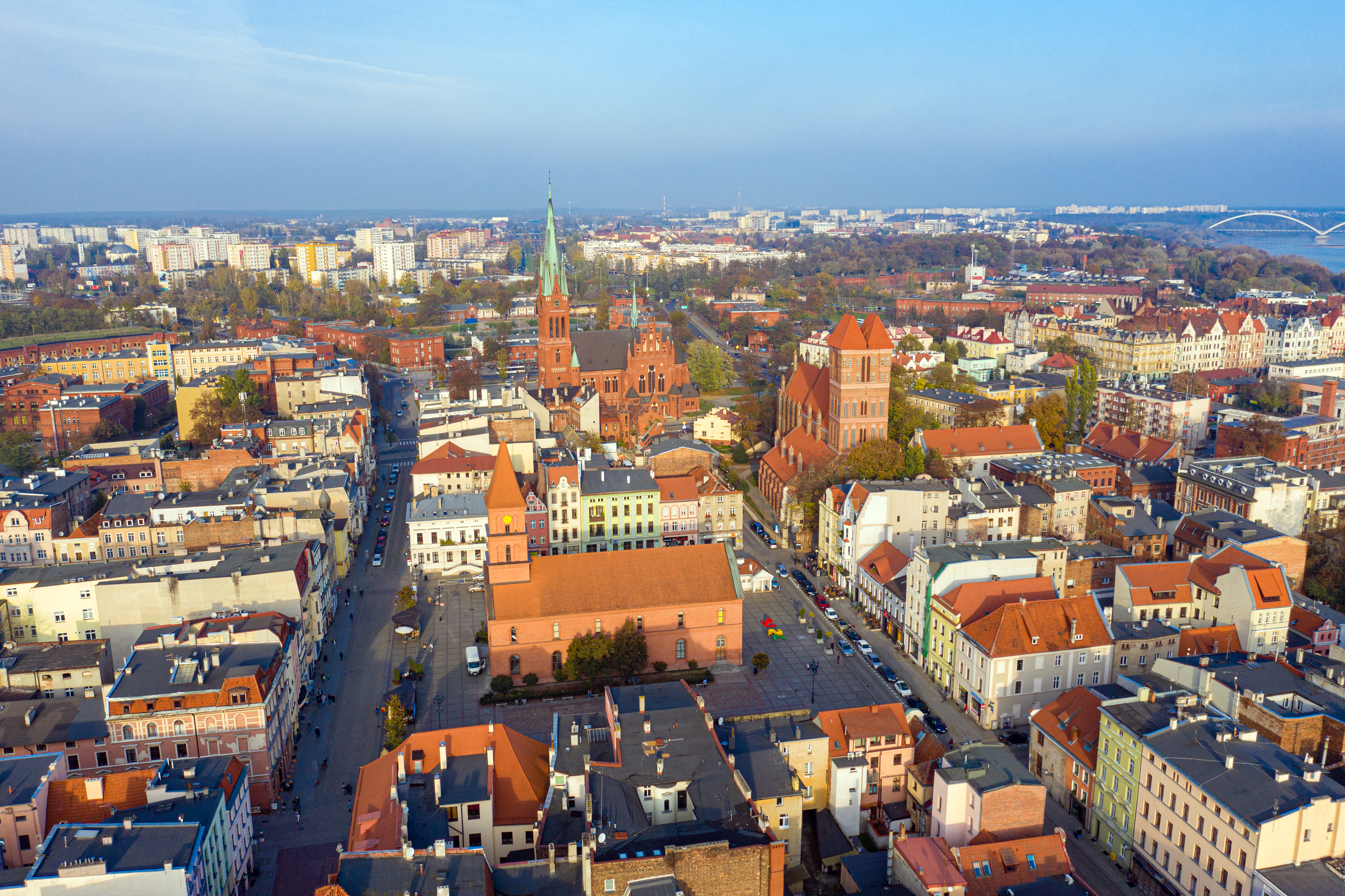
View from the west

The New Town Market Square is the central point of the New Town in Toruń, Poland, designed in 1264, when the city was founded.

== Location ==
The New Town Market Square is located in the eastern part of the Old Town Complex.

== Description ==
It is a rectangular square with dimensions of about 95 × 95 m, frontage is about 70 m long with sides located diagonally to the cardinal directions. There are two perpendicular streets starting from each corner: Szpitalna and Św. Jakuba Street in the east corner, Browarna and Ślusarska Street in the south, Królowej Jadwigi and Prosta Street in the west, and Sukiennicza and Św. Katarzyny Street in the north. St. James's Church is located at the eastern corner.

== Buildings ==
Since the beginning of the 14th century the centre of the square has been occupied by the New Town Hall, which housed the meeting room of the Town Council, the hall of the juror's court, the rooms of the chancellery and the chamberlain's, cloth halls, bread benches, and in the cellars (only rooms of the Gothic Town Hall preserved to this day) a beer cellar and a prison. After the merger of the Old Town with the New Town in 1454, the building became an auxiliary seat of the town authorities, and in time it was converted into a warehouse. Since 1668, after the evangelical community of the New Town lost the church of St. James and the necessary adaptation (including removal of the ceiling between the ground floor and the first floor), it was assigned as a Lutheran church of the Holy Trinity. Transformed into a church, the Gothic Town Hall managed to survive until the beginning of the nineteenth century. Due to its poor condition, it was decided to build a new building of the church of the Holy Trinity. The design of the church originally included the use of the existing perimeter walls together with the rear elevation; the front elevation was meant to be completely demolished. The Neo-Romanesque style building, designed by Karl Friedrich Schinkel, was finally completed in 1824. It served the Evangelicals until 1918, then from 1927 to 1939 served as an Orthodox church of the Toruń parish. Currently, it is the seat of the Tumult Foundation.

Surrounding the Market Square were tenement houses of the richest townsmen of the New Town. Due to the less mercantile and more craftsmanlike character of the New Town, the tenement houses were slightly more modest than their old town counterparts. There were meat tables in place of the present tenement house no. 10 at least since the 14th century. They occupied a plot of land about 4.6 m wide, stretching along the whole length of the block up to Wielkie Garbary Street. The square also had two of the more than twenty New Town taverns: Gospoda pod Modrym Fartuchem and the Gospoda Murarska. The New Town Wedding House was built in the place of the current tenement house No. 25 in the 16th century. As a result of numerous fires between 1413 and 1455, damages from the Teutonic wars in the fifteenth century, and later Swedish and Napoleonic wars, relatively few objects from the Middle Ages have survived. The shape of most of the tenement houses preserved today is a result of later transformations from the early modern period and from the 19th century.

All the frontages of the New Town Market Square and the facades of the corner houses have been listed in the register of real estate monuments under number A/1371 since 1961.

== Gallery ==
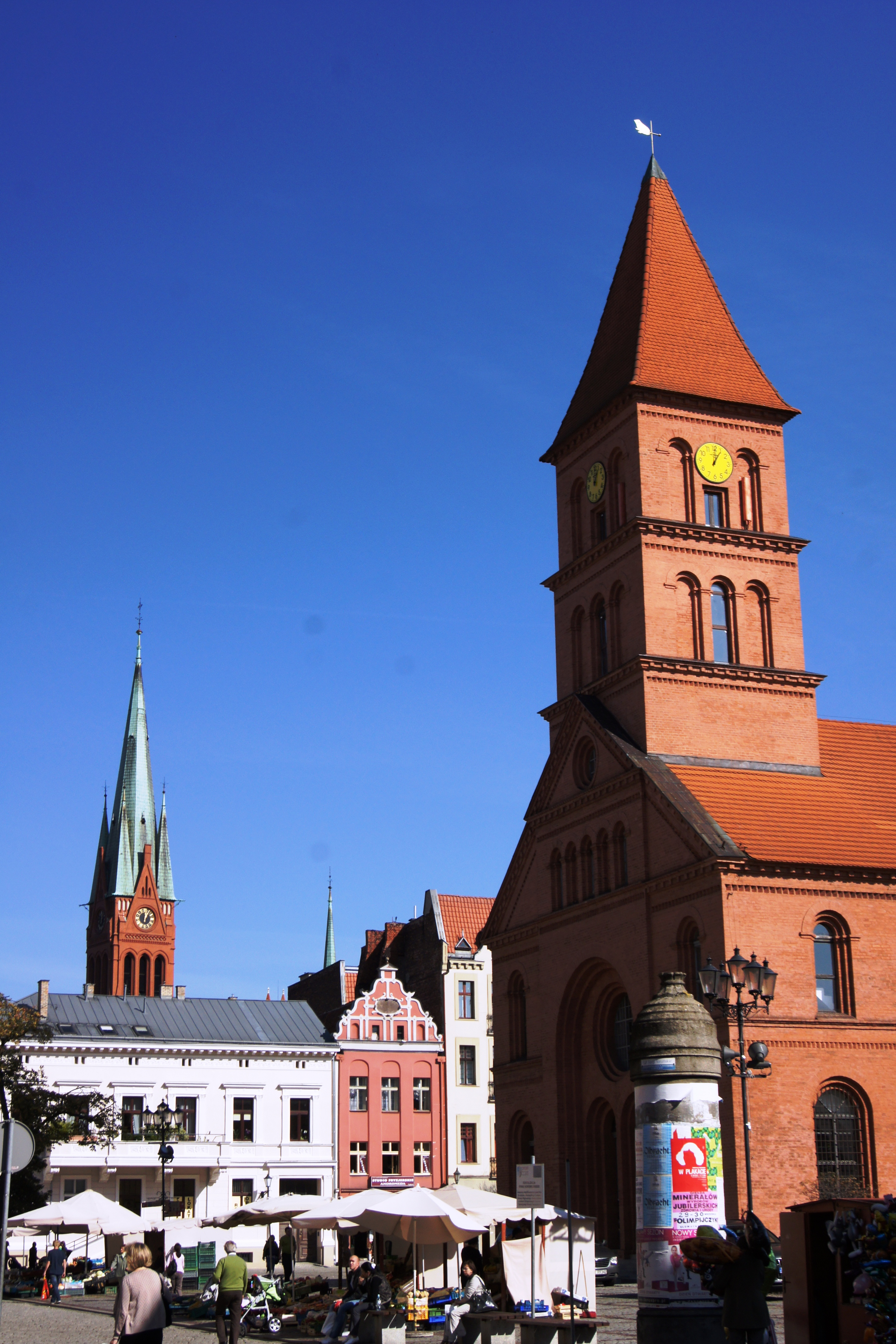

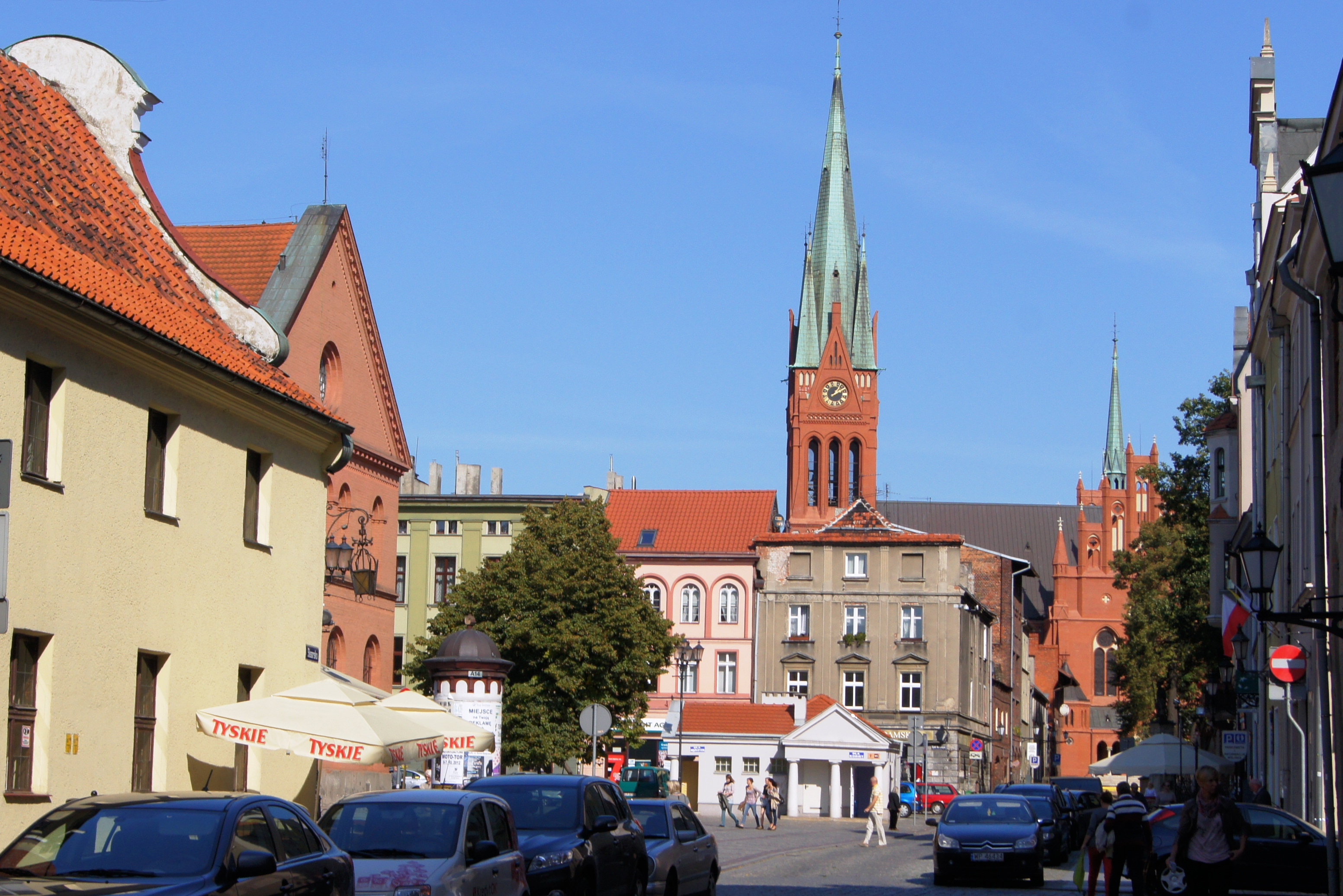

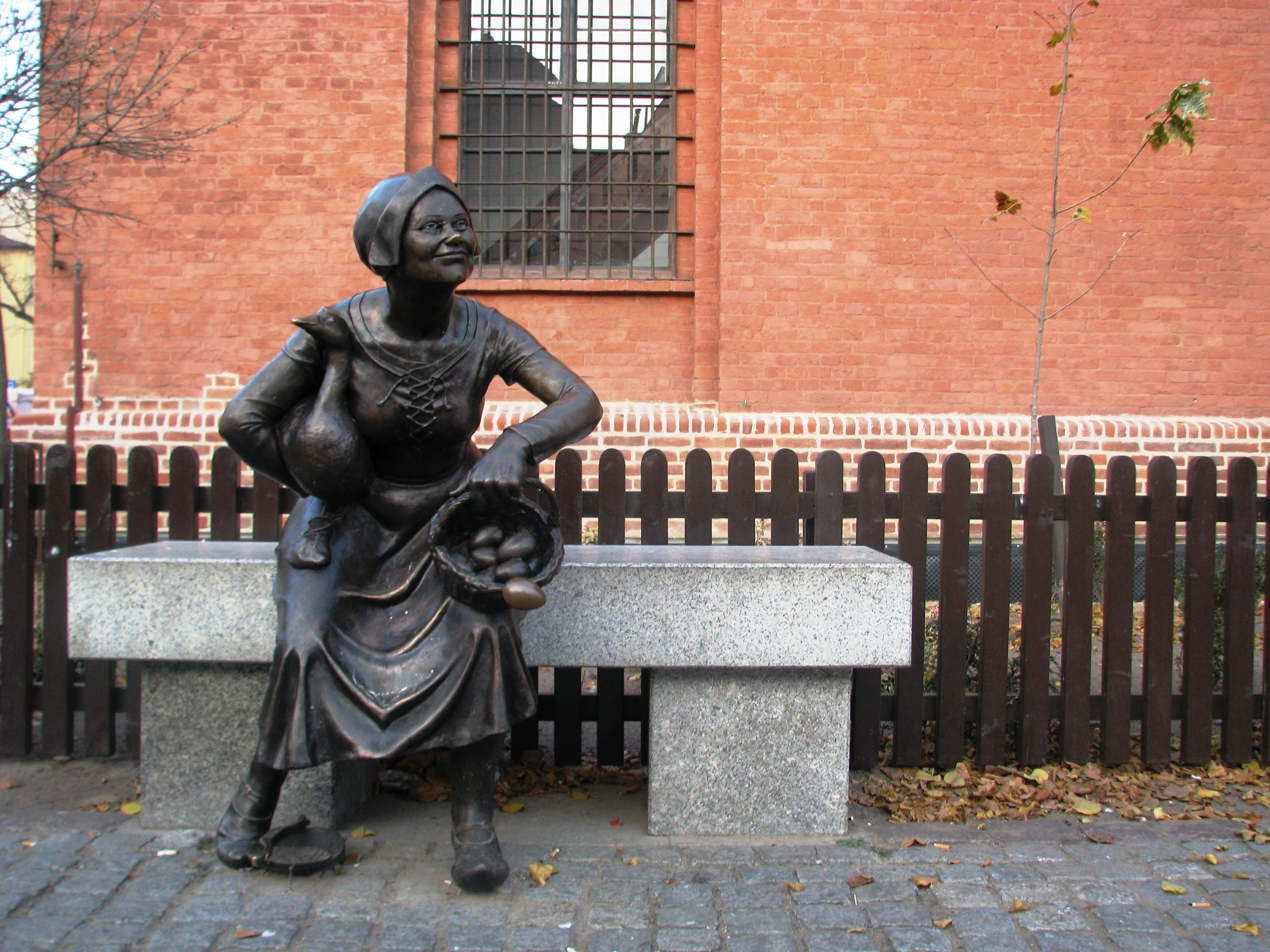

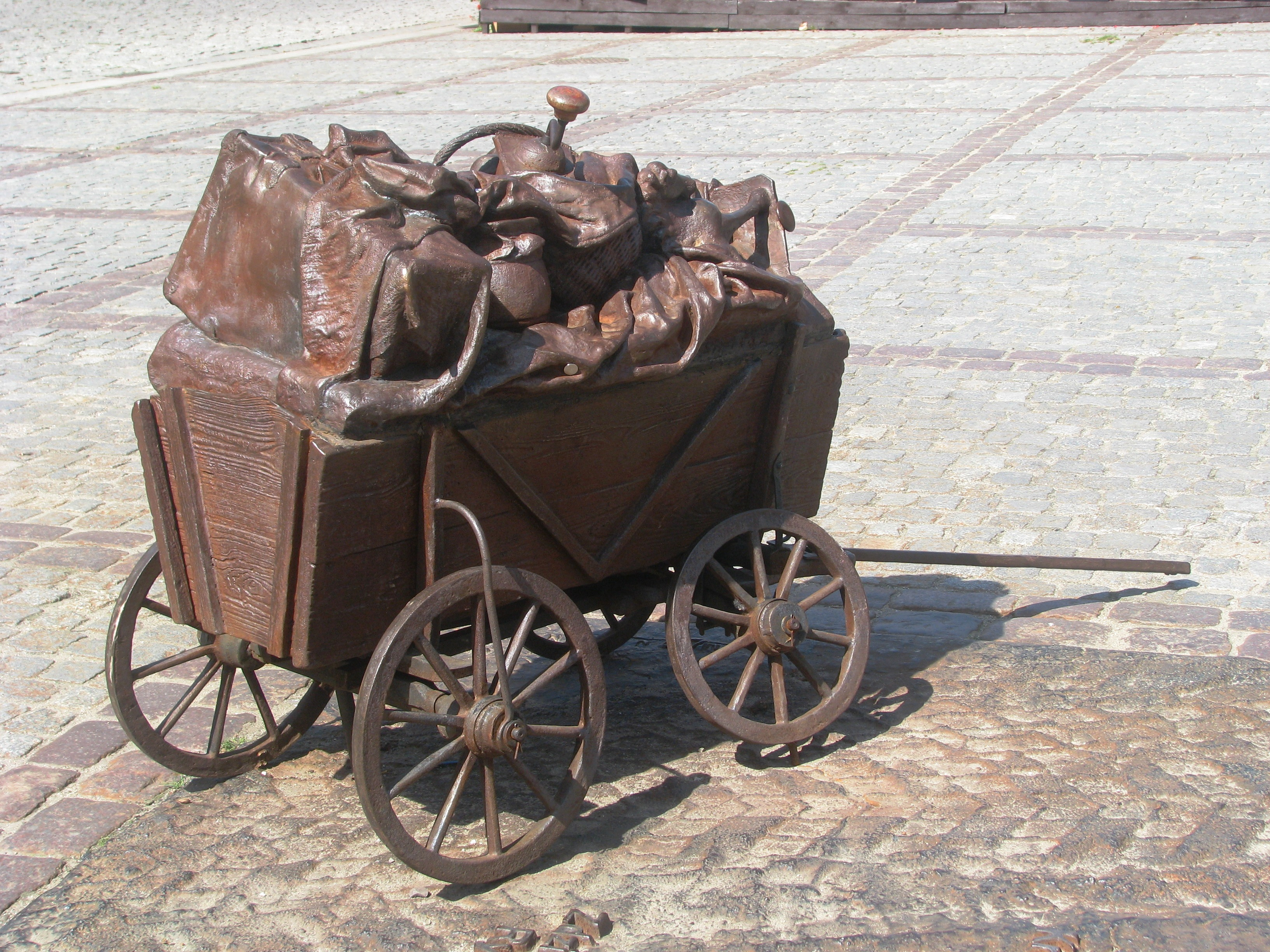

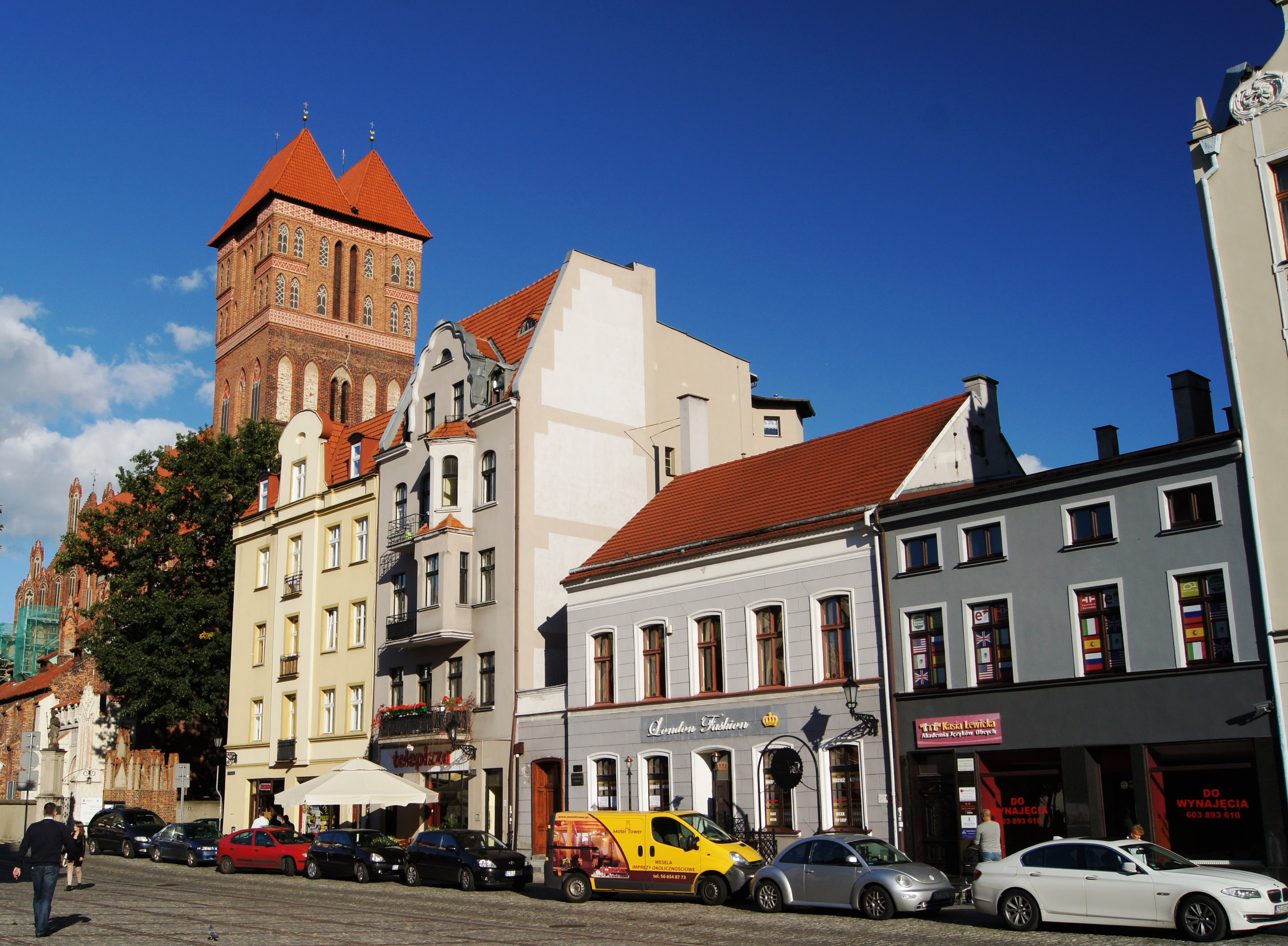

== Sources ==
- Joanna Szot, Pierzeje Rynku Nowomiejskiego w Toruniu – historia przekształceń [in:] "Rocznik Toruński" 2007 r., t. 34, p. 7-40
