= Mirosław Golon =

Polish historian (born 1964)

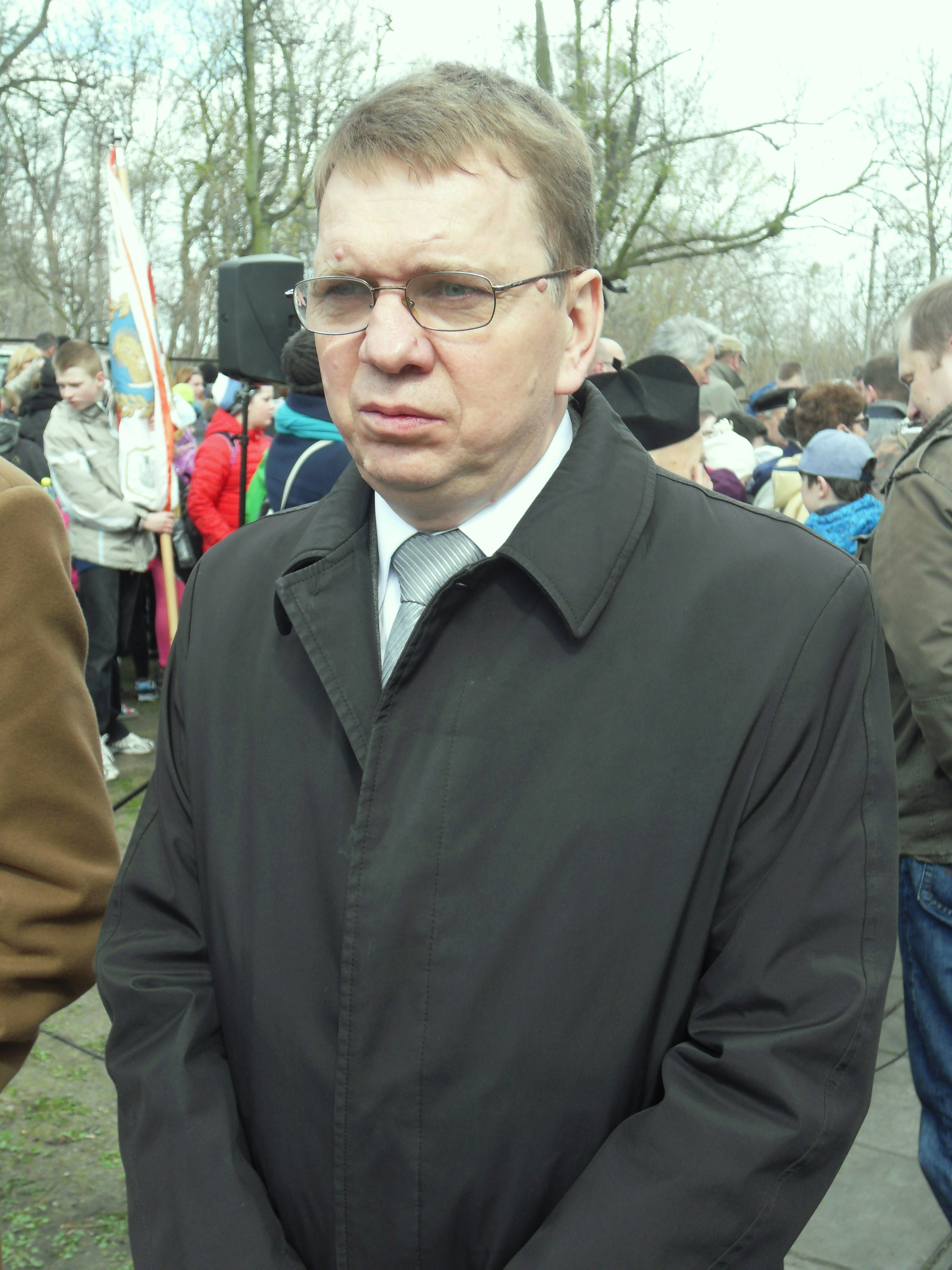
Mirosław Golon

Mirosław Golon (born 1964) is a Polish historian. Professor of Nicolaus Copernicus University in Toruń, member of Institute of National Remembrance, Polish Historical Society and Toruń Scientific Society.

Author of over 90 publications, his research interests center on the history of Poland during Stalinist period (1945–1956), Polish-Soviet relations of that period, history of minorities in Poland in the 20th century and history of Pomerania.
