= Battle of Vilnius (January 1919) =

- Part of Soviet westward offensive of 1918–1919
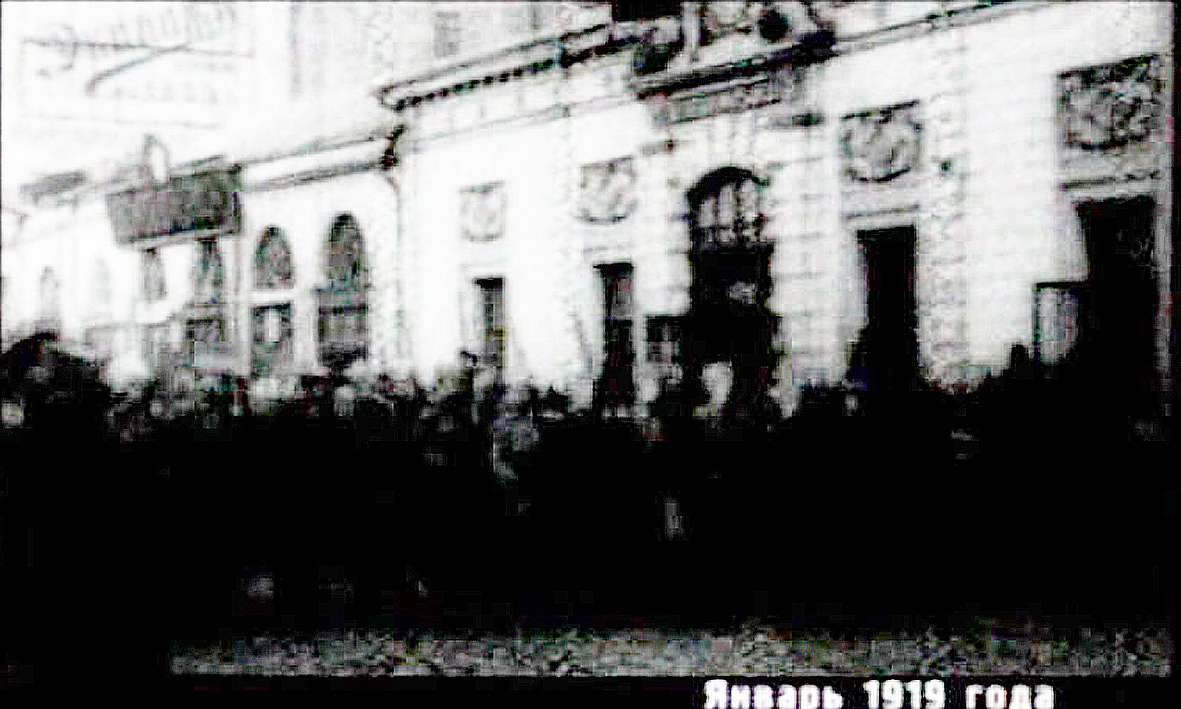
- The Red Army in Vilnius, January 6, 1919
Date	December 31, 1918 – January 5, 1919
Location	Vilnius (Wilno) and Naujoji Vilnia (Nowa Wilejka)
Result	Bolshevik victory

Belligerents
Polish self-defense	(Russian Soviet Federative Socialist Republic) Bolsheviks; Vilnius Soviet	(Weimar Republic) Germany

Commanders and leaders
Władysław Wejtko; Władysław Dąbrowski; Zygmunt Klinger	(Russian Soviet Federative Socialist Republic) Vladimir Olderogge; Kazimierz Cichowski (surrendered)	Unknown

Strength
~ 1,640	Red Army, unknown, but much bigger than the Polish forces. Vilnius Soviet,at least 84 people	Unknown

Casualties and losses
Unknown	Red Army: Unknown; Vilnius Soviet See Siege of the Vilnius Soviet	Unknown

The Battle of Vilnius in January 1919 (Polish: Walki o Wilno, Russian: Сражения за Вильно) were a series of battles fought in Vilnius between the pro-Polish Self-Defence of Lithuania and Belarus who were initially against the Imperial German Army retreating from the city and the Bolshevik paramilitaries (December 31, 1918 – January 3, 1919) and then against the attacking Red Army (January 4–5, 1919). The fighting resulted in the temporary capture of most of the city of Vilnius by the Poles, who eventually had to retreat before the Red Army came. Some historians consider this as the beginning of the Polish–Soviet War.

== Background ==
In the early 20th century, Vilnius (Polish: Wilno; Russian: Вильна, romanized: Vilna), was a part of the Russian Empire until 1915, when the city came under German occupation after a successful German offensive. In late 1918, German soldiers withdrew from the occupied lands of the former Russian Empire, and their place was taken by the Bolsheviks.

At that time, Vilnius was the subject of a territorial dispute between the newly emerging states of the region – Belarusian People's Republic, the Republic of Lithuania, and the Republic of Poland. From March 1918, the government of Lithuania resided in the city, and from early December also the government of the BPR. On December 15, the Vilnius Soviet of Workers Deputies was also established in the city. The Republic of Lithuania, which, considering it the heir to the Grand Duchy of Lithuania, claimed the right to include the city within its borders "for historical reasons". At the beginning of December, the government of the Belarusian People's Republic, headed by Anton Lutskevich, also arrived in Vilnius, forced to leave Minsk due to its occupation by the Bolsheviks. The Belarusian government also considered Vilnius as part of its territory, but at that time it sought strategic rapprochement with Lithuania, considering the Belarusian-Lithuanian territorial disputes as a matter to be resolved later.

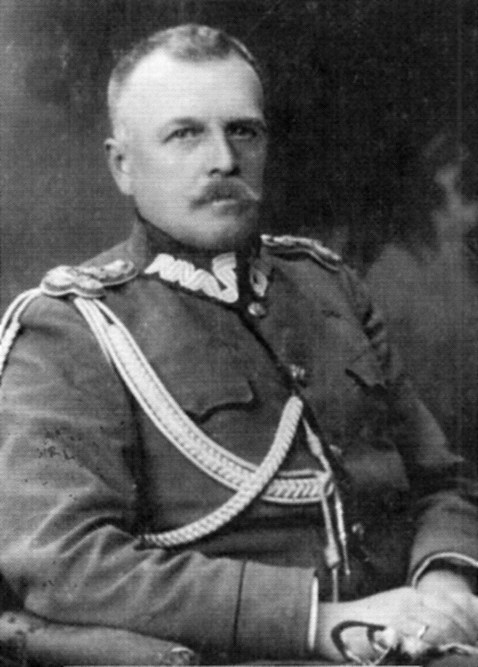
General Władysław Wejtko

The dominant national group living in Vilnius, apart from Jews, were Poles. Even before Poland gained independence, part of the Polish population of the Vilnius region was preparing to join these lands to the emerging country. The formation of Polish military formations in Vilnius began on September 10, 1918, under the patronage of the Union of Military Poles (ZWP). A Citizens' Committee was established, which in turn appointed a Public Safety Committee. Capt. Stanisław Bobiatyński participated in its work on behalf of the ZWP in Vilnius. An attempt was made to bring together the Polish, Lithuanian, Belarusian and Jewish people to defend themselves against the approaching Bolsheviks, but it failed. Therefore, the newly established Polish Self-Defense of Lithuania and Belarus intended to defend the city on its own. From December 8, this formation was commanded by General Władysław Wejtko, who attempted to transform it into a regular army. It included the Vilnius Self-Defense, commanded by General Eugeniusz Kątkowski.

At the end of December 1918, it numbered approximately 1,200 volunteers, residents of the city and surrounding areas, from whom two infantry regiments and one uhlan regiment were formed. The Polish Military Organisation (POW) in Vilnius was active under the leadership of Witold Gołębiowski.

On December 29, 1918, the Polish authorities in Warsaw, as part of the reorganization, dissolved the Self-Defense of Lithuania and Belarus and invited its members to join the ranks of the Polish Army. Władysław Wejtko was appointed commander of the Military District of Lithuania and Belarus, Adam Mokrzecki (Note: According to Dorota Michaluk it was Stefan Mokrzecki (his brother) but in fact Stefan Mokrzecki was still serving in the Ukrainian army during the battle for Vilnius.) – military commandant of Vilnius, Stanisław Bobiatyński – his deputy and Zygmunt Klinger – chief of staff. The Vilnius Self-Defense was transformed into the 1st Brigade, and General Bolesław Krejczmer became its commander. These formations, however, retained a character more similar to volunteer self-defence than a regular army. Polish troops in Vilnius were ordered to act independently in case the Red Army attempted to enter the city.

=== Preparation to the defense of Vilnius by Lithuanian-Belarusian forces ===
As the Bolsheviks were approaching Vilnius, Lithuanians and Belarusians made joint efforts to form troops to defend the city. The Lithuanian government appointed a Belarusian General Kyprian Kandratovich to the position of deputy minister of national defense, entrusting him with the task of creating a Lithuanian army with Belarusian troops in it. At the beginning of December, the formation of the 1st Belarusian Infantry Regiment (1 BPP) began in Vilnius, commanded by Col. M. Ławrentiew, battalion commanders – Col. Leniwow (a few days later dismissed from the 1st BPP) and Lt. Col. Uspensky, company commanders – Capt. Eugeniusz Hajdukiewicz, lieutenants Piatko, Żywotkiewicz and Talkowski. At the end of December, the following officers joined the regiment: Siatkowski, Hasan Konopacki, Dawid Jakubowski, Remiszewski and Łukaszewicz. The formation of the headquarters of the 2nd Belarusian Infantry Regiment also began. However, these actions turned out to be insufficient to defend Vilnius against the Bolsheviks. At the end of December, the Lithuanian army was just in the process of being formed, and its seeds were being formed in Kaunas, Alytus and Kėdainiai. The Belarusian troops in Vilnius had only officers and no privates. Therefore, on December 27, 1918, Belarusian military formations along with most members of the BRL government left Vilnius and evacuated to Grodno, which remained under German occupation.

=== Polish forces ===
At the end of December, the Polish 1st Brigade (self-defence) in Vilnius had the following structure:

- 1st Vilnius Uhlan Regiment (commander: Capt. Władysław Dąbrowski ; from November 30 to December 25, 1918, the Vilnius Self-Defense Uhlan Squadron)
- 1st Battalion (Commander: sub-captain (Note: Podkapitan is a military rank that existed for some time in Polish units created on the territory of Russia; it was above the rank of second lieutenant, but below the rank of captain) Witold Szczerbicki)
- 2nd Bn. (commander : Mikołaj Zujewicz)
- 3rd Bn. (commander: Lieutenant Edward Kaczkowski; composed of Poles – former German soldiers)
- 4th POW Bn. (commander: Lt. Jan Gołębiowski)
- Recruit Bn. (commander: Capt. Władysław Piasecki).

They were soon joined by the Officers' Legion.

== The Battle ==
=== The Polish capture of the city ===
December Coup in Vilnius 1918
Date	December 31, 1918
Location	Vilnius
Result	Polish victory: Disarmament of German units

Belligerents
Polish self-defense	(Weimar Republic) Germany	Vilnius Soviet

Commanders and leaders
Władysław Wejtko	unknown	unknown

Units involved
Vilnius self-defense	Ober Ost	Vilnius Soviet of Workers Deputies

By the end of 1918, regular Polish Army units failed to reach Vilnius. The reason was the difficulties created by the Germans in the territory they occupied, separating Vilnius from Poland. Polish self-defence units in Vilnius, anticipating that the Germans would hand over Vilnius to the Bolsheviks on January 5, decided to independently take control of the city and remove German troops from it. On December 31, 1918, the commander of the Military District of Lithuania and Belarus, General Władysław Wejtko, issued a mobilization order in which he said:

all Poles capable of arms, from the age of 17, immediately report to the recruitment office – Užupis (Zarzecze) 5, and all Lithuanians join the Lithuanian army. I leave it to Belarusians and Jews to choose the military formation they want to join.

On the same day, the first fighting broke out in Vilnius. The 3rd Bn. captured the Vilnius Town Hall. Skirmishes also took place in other parts of the city, in the area of the Gate of Dawn, where Polish soldiers began disarming German soldiers. As a result of the negotiations, the German command agreed to hand over part of the city to the Polish formations, while retaining control over the street Wielka Pohulanka (now Jono Basanavičiaus Street) and the Vilnius railway station. On January 1, 1919, the Polish-German demarcation line was established. On the same day, the Polish military commandant of Vilnius, General Adam Mokrzecki, who took power in the city, issued a proclamation to the inhabitants calling for order, and also:

guaranteeing the security of life and property of all people residing in Vilnius, regardless of nationality, ensuring freedom of existence for political parties.

The Lithuanian government limited itself to the symbolic gesture of hanging Lithuanian flag over the Vilnius Castle Hill, and then on January 1 it also evacuated with the Germans by train to Kaunas. The reason for the evacuation of the Lithuanian government was not only the approach of the Bolsheviks to the city but also the fear that after the Poles established themselves there, its further work would be very difficult or impossible.

Władysław Dąbrowski became the actual commander of the Polish self-defence forces on his initiative and only later formally received this position from General Wejtka. The Germans decided to evacuate the city and did not resist the Polish forces. On the night of January 2–3, Polish scouts, railway workers and POW members took over the Vilnius railway station.

=== Siege of the Vilnius Soviet on Jakšto Street ===
Siege of the Vilnius Soviet
Date	January 1, 1919
Location	Jakšto Street, Vilnius
Result	Polish victory: Surrender of the Vilnius Soviet

Belligerents
Polish self-defense	Vilnius Soviet

Commanders and leaders
Władysław Wejtko; W. Dąbrowski (Note: According to some sources it was Jerzy Dąbrowski)	Julius Simelevičius †; B. Verbickas †; Leonas Čaplinskis †; A. Liaudanskas †; Jankelis Šapira †; K. Cichowski (surrendered)

As German soldiers evacuated from Vilnius, the socialist movements attempted to take power in the city and held elections to the Vilnius Soviet of Workers Deputies in mid-December. In the last days of the German occupation, the Soviet held two sessions, and declared itself the only legal authority in the city and issued the first decrees; its headquarters was in a building at Wronia Street. The Soviet preparing for an armed confrontation with the Polish self-defence, proceeded to organize a workers militia. The chairman of the Council was Kazimierz Cichowski, former secretary of the Petrograd group of the Social Democracy of the Kingdom of Poland and Lithuania (SDKPiL), and the secretary of the praesidium was Jan Kulikowski, a Pole from Trakai County, member of SDKPiL and the Communist Workers' Party of Poland; its headquarters was in a building at Crow (now Jakšto) Street. The Soviet was of a mixed nature; the largest but not dominant faction was the Bolsheviks, balanced by Mensheviks, Bundists, Lithuanian Social Democrats and other groups.

On January 1, 1919, Polish self-defence units under the command of Capt. Dąbrowski (2nd Bn. and about 30 soldiers from the 3rd Bn.) surrounded the Soviet, which had barricaded the Workers' Club building at Jakšto Street 5. (Note: dubbed "Crow Nest" (Polish: Wronie Gniazdo)) At around 11 pm the leader of the Polish forces, General Władysław Wejtko, issued an ultimatum to surrender which the Soviet refused. The fight lasted for over twelve hours, which ended with the surrender of the Vilnius Soviet at 2 pm. As a result of the siege on the Polish side, 1 soldier was killed (Note: According to Wołłejko, 0 Poles were killed) and 4 were wounded. On the defenders' side, 3 combatants died, 5 committed suicide, and 76-100 were taken prisoner. The suiciders included: the commandant of the people's militia, Leonas Čaplinskis, Antanas Liaudanskas, Jankelis Šapira, Julius Simelevičius (Brother of Boris Shimeliovich) and the Vilnius shoemaker, Bonifacas Verbickas. Roman Pilar attempted to shoot himself, but survived. Moreover, Polish self-defence soldiers captured over 1,000 rifles and 600 grenades, mainly German ones. On January 9, 1919, after the Red Army captured Vilnius, a ceremonial burial for the deceased members of the Vilnius Soviet was organized at the Cathedral Square. During the post-World War II Soviet era, Wronia Street (Later Dąbrowski Street) was renamed Komunarų Street in memory of the five men.

=== The first attack of the Red Army on Vilnius ===
First Red Army attack on Vilnius
Date	January 4, 1919
Location	Vilnius and Naujoji Vilnia
Result	Polish victory

Belligerents
Polish self-defense	(Russian Soviet Federative Socialist Republic) Bolsheviks

Commanders and leaders
Władysław Wejtko	(Russian Soviet Federative Socialist Republic) Vladimir Olderogge

Casualties and losses
Heavy	Heavy

On January 2, the Soviet Western Army approached Vilnius from three directions: from Nemenčinė, Maladzyechna and Lida. The commander of the Polish self-defence forces, Władysław Wejtko, led some of the forces (part of the Vilnius Uhlan Regiment, the 3rd Bn. and the Officer's Legion) to the area of Naujoji Vilnia to block the enemy's movement there. Meanwhile, the rest of the Vilnius Uhlan Regiment, the 1st Bn., the 4th POW Bn. and other small units remained in Vilnius, under the command of Capt. Władysław Dąbrowski.

The order to capture Vilnius was given to the Pskov Rifle Division's 2nd Rifle Brigade, which was in Pabradė on January 1. For this task, it was reinforced with the Zienkowicz's 5th Vilnius Rifle Regiment. Simultaneously, the 144th and 146th Regiments of Grigory Borzinsky's 17th Rifle Division and a unit separated from the Vladimir Yershov's Western Rifle Division were heading from Molodechno to Vilnius. To complete the task of capturing Vilnius, the 2nd Rifle Brigade's command sent the 4th Regiment through Pabradė to Mickūnai, so that, together with the 1st Regiment, it occupied the railway station in Naujoji Vilnia. In turn, the 5th Vilnius Regiment was sent from Pabradė through Nemenčinė to Vilnius. Bolshevik troops were ordered to suppress Polish resistance by force.

On January 4, 1919, the first battles with the attacking Red Army took place near Naujoji Vilnia. The Bolsheviks sent there the 1st Bn. and, moving to the right of it, two companies of the 4th Bn. of the Pskov Regiment under Mokhnachev's command. The Polish cavalry suffered losses and was forced to withdraw. The infantry tried to counterattack Naujoji Vilnia, but this attempt failed. Regular units of the Red Army had a significant advantage over improvised, irregular Polish self-defence units. Moreover, the Poles had very limited supplies of ammunition and no prepared defensive positions on the approaches to the city or in the city itself.

At the same time, the Bolsheviks sent the 5th Vilnius Regiment to directly attack Vilnius. General Władysław Wejtko decided to withdraw Polish troops from Naujoji Vilnia to Vilnius. Shortly afterwards, they encountered German forces on Wielka Pohulanka Street, as a result of which the Poles suffered further losses, including officers. The Bolsheviks attacked the city mainly from the direction of Naujoji Vilnia and Nemenčinė. The self-defence formations were forced to retreat to the city centre, where, thanks to combining forces, they repelled the attack of the Red Army.

=== The second attack of the Red Army on Vilnius ===
Second Red Army attack on Vilnius
Date	January 5, 1919
Location	Vilnius and Naujoji Vilnia
Result	Soviet victory
Territorial changes	Vilnius is captured by the Red Army

Belligerents
Polish self-defense	(Russian Soviet Federative Socialist Republic) Bolsheviks

Commanders and leaders
Władysław Wejtko; Jerzy Dąbrowski	(Russian Soviet Federative Socialist Republic) Vladimir Olderogge

Units involved
1st Self defense battalion 2nd Self defense battalion 3rd Self defense battalion 4th Self defense battalion	Unknown

Casualties and losses
Heavy	Unknown

The Polish self-defence repelling the attack surprised the Bolsheviks. To better coordinate actions, the next day the Bolsheviks created a unified command. A second attempt was planned to take the city by a strong attack on the centre and then encircling the wing. However, the command of the 5th Vilnius Regiment accused the leadership of incompetence in planning and directing the attack and refused to participate in the action.

On January 5, the Bolshevik group concentrated in Naujoji Vilnia started attacking Vilnius. The Poles organized the defence as follows: the 1st, 2nd and 4th Bns. defended the city's southern part, including Užupis, while the 3rd Bn. and the Vilnius Lancers Regiment defended the approaches to Antakalnis. The 4th POW Bn. focused on defending the Vilnius defence headquarters building in Užupis. Meanwhile, from the southeast, the 17th Rifle Division's 146th Rifle Regiment attacked along the Ashmyany-Vilnius road. The fighting began in the suburbs, namely Antakalnis, where the Bolshevik 5th Vilnius Rifle Regiment broke through and occupied the Hill of the Three Crosses. From there, they started artillery bombardment of the city, especially Užupis, where the Polish headquarters were. Then the Soviet infantry attacked the center of Vilnius. Around 1:00 pm, the decisive assault on the city by Bolshevik forces from three sides began. After doing this the Soviets attacked the Gate of Dawn, capturing it successfully.

The Bolshevik advantage in this clash was very large. The Vilnius self-defence force received information from Warsaw that it would be impossible to provide it with help from regular Polish Army units. Therefore, City Council's civilian representatives suggested to General Wejtka to stop the fighting. They were afraid of reprisals from the Bolsheviks if they were forced to take the city by storm. On January 5, at 7 pm, the chief of staff, Capt. Zygmunt Klinger, decided to stop the fighting and leave Vilnius since there was no chance of staying in the city.

=== The Polish retreat from Vilnius ===
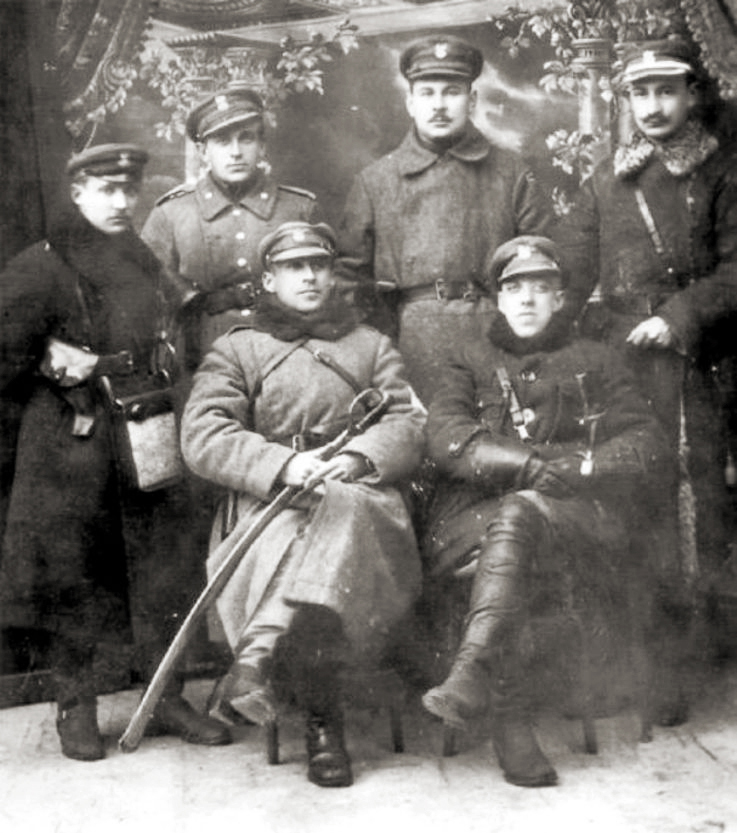
Command of the volunteer unit of the Dąbrowski brothers – February 1919. Seated from the left: Władysław and Jerzy Dąbrowski

The evacuation of the combat units and services took place in great chaos because it had not been planned beforehand. There was no detailed plan for the withdrawal of the Vilnius crew, and the whole complicated operation had to be improvised. The order issued by the Chief of Staff, Captain Klinger, only stated that the place where the troops were to assemble was the castle at Baltoji Vokė, about 8 km south-west of Vilnius. It was known that there were neither German nor Bolshevik troops there. The necessary number of transport vehicles was not available, so it was not possible to take all the food and weapons. Having received this order, General Wejtko and Captain Klinger set off by car in the direction of Lentvaris, near the town of Waka Tyszkiewiczowska, about 6 km north-west of Baltoji Vokė, where they encountered the German 101st Infantry Bn. and were interned. The Germans also controlled the railway station at Lentvaris.

In this situation, individual commanders made their own decisions. Most of them, according to the orders they received, directed their units towards Baltoji Vokė and nearby Khazbijevich and other places. There the Rifle Regiment and the 1st Vilnius Uhlan Regiment were present until 7.00 a.m. on January 6.

On the basis of the information received from the Germans and an analysis of the position of their own troops, General Wejtko and Captain Klinger came to the conclusion that an independent march to Podlasie was impossible. The units did not have the wagons left in Vilnius, there was no food and money, the soldiers did not have winter uniforms, the area of the eventual march, inhabited mainly by Byelorussians, was devastated by the war, making it impossible to resupply during the retreat. In this situation, through Captain Wenderlich of the 101st Bn., negotiations began with several German commands (Ober Ost in Kaunas, 10th Army in Grodno and one of the Reserve Corps). They ended with the signing of an agreement that the German military authorities would provide rail transport from Lentvaris to Lapy, including provisions for the duration of the transit. However, General Wejtko soldiers were to deposit their weapons (except white weapons) in one of the wagons and surrender their horses. Everything was to be returned to them in Lapy. On the basis of this agreement, Captain Klinger issued an order which read:

"During today's march to Vokė (Count Tyszkiewicz's castle). From there we will march at 8.30 AM to Lentvaris to the prepared train to Łapy. Provisions provided".

The troops largely obeyed the order; the 1st and 2nd Bns. of the Rifle Regiment marched to Lentvaris, where, after laying down their arms, they were loaded onto wagons and transported to Łapy. There, 154 officers and 1,035 non-commissioned officers and sergeants joined the Lithuanian–Belarusian Division that was being formed. Some Polish soldiers continued the fight while making the way through Paneriai, Rūdninkai, Eišiškės and Novy Dvor.

== Aftermath ==
The defense of Vilnius despite initial successes became a disaster for the outnumbered Polish self-defense. According to Leon Wasilewski Piłsudski broke into tears after hearing that Vilnius fell to the Bolsheviks. After the battle 500 men led by the Dąbrowski brothers decided on a cavalry march to Brest. The main goal of the march was to reach the Grodno self-defense commanded by Mikołaj Sulewski. During the campaign the Poles captured Różana and Prużany. For 5 Months the Dąbrowski brothers engaged in a guerilla war with the Bolsheviks, giving them high losses.

=== Reactions of the Belarusian government ===
On January 3, 1919, the Prime Minister of the BRL, Anton Luckievich, handed over a protest note to the Polish Minister of Foreign Affairs, Leon Wasilewski. His government was dissatisfied with the fact that General Władysław Wejtko announced mobilization in Vilnius, which also included Belarusians living there. In this way, he intended to make it clear that he treated the Vilnius region as part of the BRL and did not agree to any other country taking action there. According to historian Dorota Michaluk, this type of protest in the situation of the ongoing siege of Vilnius by the Bolsheviks could have been treated very unfavourably by a significant part of its inhabitants, because it could easily be misinterpreted as an expression of pro-Bolshevik sympathies or a call to abandon the defence.

== Historical dispute ==
The fighting between Polish and Bolshevik forces, which began on January 4, 1919, was the first fight in which units formally part of the Polish Army and the Red Army fought against each other. For this reason, some historians, including Waldemar Rezmer, accept this date as the beginning of the Polish-Bolshevik war. However, the Polish self-defence formations in Vilnius were improvised and irregular units, operating without specific orders from Supreme Command of the Polish Army. For this reason, most historians do not treat the above-mentioned fights as the beginning of a regular Polish-Bolshevik war, although they admit that it was an announcement of it in the near future.

== See also ==
- Żeligowski's Mutiny
- Vilna offensive
- Battle of Bereza Kartuska
- Nieśwież uprising

== Sources ==
=== Bibliography ===
- Jacobs, Jack (2022). The Bund in Vilna, 1918–1939. Liverpool. ISBN 9785420000359.
- Senn, Alfred Erich (1975). The Emergence of Modern Lithuania. Greenwood Press. ISBN 978-0-8371-7780-9.
- Sloin, Andrew (2017). The Jewish Revolution in Belorussia: Economy, Race, and Bolshevik Power. Indiana University Press. ISBN 978-0-253-02463-3.
- Balkelis, Tomas (2018). War, Revolution, and Nation-making in Lithuania, 1914-1923. Oxford University Press. ISBN 978-0-19-966802-1.
- Vileikis, Algirdas (1988). Вильнюс - столица советской Литвы (in Russian). Mintis. ISBN 9785417000409.

==== Lithuanian-language sources ====
- Vaitkevičius, Bronius (1967). Socialistinė revoliucija Lietuvoje 1918-1919 metais (in Lithuanian).
- Vaitkevičius, Bronius (1998). Pirmoji darbininkų ir valstiečių valdžia Lietuvoje: Monografija skiriama LKP įkūrimo ir Tarybų valdžios paskelbimo Lietuvoje 70-mečiui (in Lithuanian). Vilnius. ISBN 978-5-420-00035-9.
- Saldžiūnas, Vaidas (December 29, 2017). "Detektyvas: kodėl nuo Gedimino kalno dingo pagrindinis valstybės simbolis ir kuo čia dėtas Kaunas?" (in Lithuanian). Delfi.lt.
- Rimkė, Edita (November 25, 2014). "Vilniaus senamiesčio gatvių pavadinimai sovietinėje Lietuvoje" (in Lithuanian). Bernardinai.lt.

==== Polish-language sources ====
- Łatyszonek, Oleg (1995). Białoruskie formacje wojskowe 1917–1923 (in Polish). Białystok. ISBN 83-903068-5-9.
- Michaluk, Dorota (2010). Białoruska Republika Ludowa 1918–1920: U podstaw białoruskiej państwowości [The Belarusian People's Republic 1918–1920: At the foundations of Belarusian statehood.] (in Polish). Toruń: Wydawnictwo Naukowe Uniwersytetu Mikołaja Kopernika. ISBN 9788323124849.
- Wyszczelski, Lech (2010). Wojna polsko-rosyjska 1919–1920 (in Polish). Warsaw. ISBN 9788311119345.
- Filipow, Krzysztof (1988). Samoobrona polska na Kresach Wschodnich 1918-1919 (PDF) (in Polish).
- Wołłejko, Michał (November 8, 2012). "Droga do zwycięstwa zaczęła się w Wilnie". Wilnoteka.lt (in Polish).
- Rezmer, Waldemer (2010). Walki o Wilno w styczniu 1919 roku. ISSN 2081-8742.
- Aleksandrowicz, Stanisław (1929). "Zarys historji wojennej 13-go pułku ułanów wileńskich". PAN Biblioteka Kórnicka.
- Waligóra, Bolesław (1938). Walka o Wilno: okupacja Litwy i Białorusi w 1918–1919 r. przez Rosję Sowiecką (in Polish). Wydawnictwo Zarządu Miejskiego w Wilnie.
