= Battle of Vilnius =

Battle of Vilnius may refer to:

- Siege of Vilnius (1390), unsuccessful siege by the Teutonic Order
- Battle of Vilnius (1655), Tsardom of Muscovy captures the city during the Russo-Polish War (1654–1667)
- Battle of Vilnius (1660), Grand Duchy of Lithuania recaptures the city from Muscovy
- Battle of Vilnius (1702), Grand Duchy of Lithuania unsuccessfully attempts to capture the city from Sweden during the Great Northern War

== 19th century ==
- Battle of Vilnius (1812): Part of French invasion of Russia
- Battle of Paneriai (1831): part of uprising of 1831, ended with Russian victory

== 20th century ==
- Battle of Vilnius (1915), Imperial German Army defeats the Imperial Russian Army and captures the city during World War I
- Battle of Vilnius (January 1919), The Polish Self-Defence of Lithuania and Belarus fails to defend Vilnius against the Red Army
- Vilna offensive (1919), Poland captures the city during the Polish–Soviet War
- Battle of Vilnius (1920), Soviet Union captures the city during the Polish–Soviet War

=== World War II ===
- Battle of Wilno (1939), Soviet Union captures the city during the Invasion of Poland
- Battle of Vilnius (1941), Lithuanian insurgents of the June Uprising take over Vilnius before the German Wehrmacht arrives in the city during Operation Barbarossa
- Operation Ostra Brama (1944), the Polish Home Army fails to capture the city from the Wehrmacht by itself during the Operation Tempest
- Vilnius offensive (1944), Soviet occupation of the city
