= Self-Defence of Lithuania and Belarus =

Self-Defence of Lithuania and Belarus (Polish: Samoobrona Litwy i Białorusi) comprised voluntary paramilitary units formed in late 1918, in the aftermath of World War I, in Lithuania and Belarus. They were mostly composed of Poles in Lithuania and Belarus loyal to the nascent Second Polish Republic formed after over a century of the Partitions of Poland. Their actions centered around Vilnius (Wilno), Minsk (Mińsk), and Grodno.

These territories were once the Grand Duchy of Lithuania (itself part of the Polish–Lithuanian Commonwealth during 1569-1795), which had then become the Russian Empire's Western Krai. During the interwar period, those areas became the Second Polish Republic's Eastern Borderlands.

Besides fighting for Poland, the Self-Defence units sought to protect local populations against marauders and fight the Soviet Russian Red Army that pursued the retreating Germans.

In January 1919, Polish Self-Defence was officially organized as the 1st Lithuanian–Belarusian Division, which took part in the Polish–Soviet War of 1919–1920.

== 1918 ==
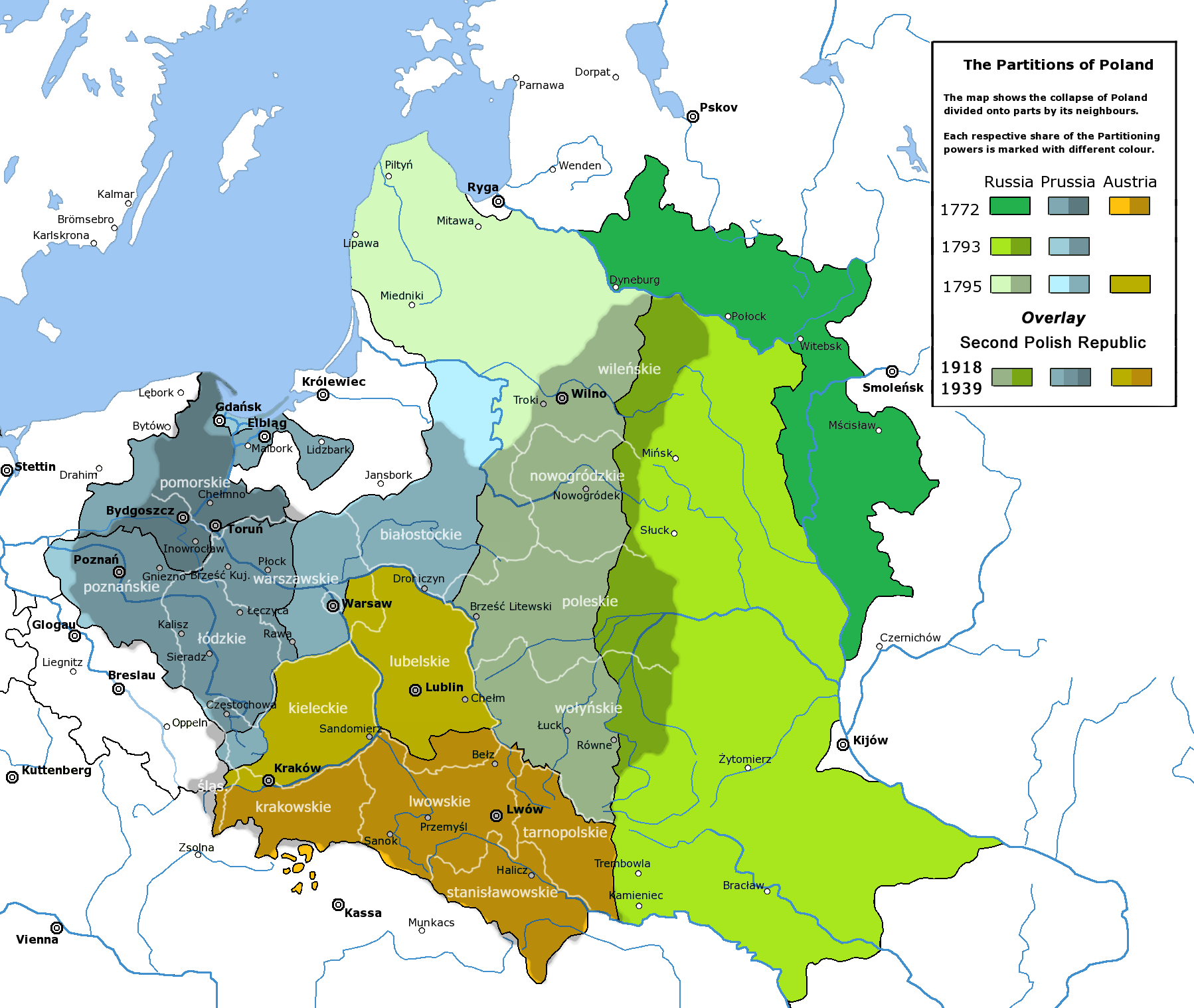
Location of Wilno and Grodno on the map of Partitioned Poland overlaid (in gray) with the reconstituted sovereign Poland of 1919

The Self-Defence of Lithuania and Belarus was created by a group of officers of the former Polish I Corps in Russia, which initially formed the Union of Military Poles in Vilnius. At the end of October 1918, the chief of the Polish General Staff, General Tadeusz Rozwadowski, appointed General Władysław Wejtko as the "head of all self-defence formations in Lithuania and Belarus". While Wejtko failed to establish self-defence in Belarus due to unfavourable conditions and a lack of time, the situation was better in Vilnius, where many Polish officers gathered and there were ties with the Polish Committee.

There were also cells of Polish Military Organisation (POW) in Vilnius and Minsk. The POW was partially liquidated in Minsk after the evacuation before the Soviet occupation and so it did not engage in any serious actions, while the Vilnius POW was crushed by the occupying Imperial German Army in 1918. In mid-November, when Witold Gołębiowski arrived in Vilnius, his work was complicated by the very fragmentation of the organization and in his own words:

"The area was undeveloped in the terms of the Polish Military Organisation, I found 12 former members in the city of Vilnius, and absolutely nothing in the rural province."

On December 8, 1918, General Władysław Wejtko, formerly of the Imperial Russian Army and one of the Self-Defence's organisers, arrived in Warsaw, Poland's capital. Józef Piłsudski, the Chief of State of Poland, confirmed his military rank of lieutenant general in the newly-formed Polish Army and appointed him the leader of all Polish voluntary forces in present-day Lithuania and Belarus. Wejtko received 375,000 marks from the Borderlands' Defence Committee for Self-Defence's needs, including provisions, pay, firearms, and horses.

These militias were soon overwhelmed by numerically superior Bolshevik armies. In December 1918, 1,500 Self-Defence Poles and Belarusians attempted to defend Minsk against advancing Soviet Russian forces. Russian numerical superiority, and lack of support from the short-lived Belarusian National Republic, forced them to withdraw toward Poland.

When Minsk fell to Soviet troops on December 10, 1918, this greatly affected the morale of Self-Defence activists, and even their commander did not expect to successfully defend Vilnius against the invading Bolsheviks. Thus, he presented the situation to Piłsudski in Warsaw, asking for help. Help was promised, but Piłsudski emphasized that it would not be immediately available. General Wejtko was then appointed "commander of all national self-defence formations in Lithuania and Belarus". Also, General Mikołaj Sulewski was made commander of the self-defence in Grodno that he began organizing.

=== Organisation of the Self-Defence of Lithuania in December 1918 ===
In December 1918, the Self-Defence of Lithuania was divided into two groups: Vilnius and Lida, which were to constitute a Self-Defence Brigade led by Col. Borodzicz, who was headquartered in Vilnius.

Col. Zubrzycki's Vilnius group
Battalion	Commander	Location(s)
1st	Lt. Col. Jankowski	Vilnius
2nd		Šumskas, Nemenčinė, Širvintos, and Molėtai
3rd	Captain Benedykt Matarewicz	Pabradė, Švenčionys, Soly, and Lyntupy

Gen. Adam Mokrzecki's Lida group
Battalion	Commander	Location(s)
1st		Ashmyany
2nd	Captain Zagórski	Stakliškės, Naujieji Trakai, Varėna and Kaišiadorys
3rd	Captain Mienicki	Lida, Radun, Shchuchyn and Belitsa

The battalions consisted of companies, more often called teams (drużyna), which were formed in various towns in the designated area.

=== Self-Defence in Grodno ===
The Grodno Self-Defence began to be organised on November 12, 1918 at an organizational meeting in Grodno. At the second meeting on November 15, the composition of the command staff and the staff of local commands (komendantura) in the provinces was established. Polish commands were established in Adamavichy, Sapotskin, Zhytomlia, Indura, Vyalikaya Byerastavitsa, Kapciouka, Porechcha, Novy Dvor, Hozha, and later in Kuźnica, Aziory, Talochki, and Skolabava.

=== Plan for relief from Poland ===
Although there was no confidence to defend Vilnius after the fall of Minsk, but enthusiasm in the ranks was increased due to speeches about relief from Poland by Capt. Zygmunt Klinger, who just arrived from the Polish–Ukrainian War. This relief was intended to come and Piłsudski initiated negotiations for this purpose, sending delegates to Kaunas. The idea was for Ober Ost to agree to allow the transportation of Polish military units to Vilnius. However, the negotiations on this matter dragged on and were ultimately fruitless.

=== Preparation for battle ===
Meanwhile, the command of the Self-Defence of Lithuania and Belarus, taking into account the possible relief from Poland, intended to act against the approaching Russian troops, whose arrival was expected around January 5, 1919, because the Germans announced they would end their occupation of Vilnius that day. The Poles were deciding on when to launch an armed uprising to seize Vilnius, because there was the threat that control of the city could be taken by the control of Bolsheviks and their militias, reinforced by Soviet soldiers. To prepare for combat, the Self-Defence's Command issued an order to concentrate both the Vilnius and Lida groups in Vilnius by the end of December. Ultimately, only the 1st and 3rd battalions from this last group arrived, while the rest remained in place.

On December 29, 1918, the Self-Defence organization was dissolved by order No. 1, and the "Military District of Lithuania and Belarus" was created instead.

Newly-organized units in Vilnius from those gathered
Unit	Commander	Notes
1st Vilnius Uhlan Regiment	Capt. Władysław Dąbrowski	
1st Battalion	Capt. Szczerbicki	
2nd Battalion	Capt. Zujewicz	Surplus officers formed the Officers' Legion incorporated into the 2nd Battalion
3rd Battalion	Lt. Kaczkowski	
4th Battalion POW	Lt. Gołębiowski	
Recruit Battalion	Capt. Piasecki	

== 1919 ==
In early January 1919, a 2,500-man Self-Defence force was created to defend the Vilnius Region against the Red Army. In a four-day battle for Vilnius lasting till 5 January, Polish forces were pushed back near Naujoji Vilnia. They retreated south toward what had been the Regency Kingdom of Poland (1917–1918).^{[Part 1]} The area changed hands several times during the Vilna offensive of 19–21 April 1919 and Operation Minsk in early August.

In January 1919 most of the Self-Defence was organized as the 1st Lithuanian–Belarusian Division under the command of General Wejtko and officially became part of the Polish Army.

== Sources ==
=== Bibliography ===
- "1. Samoobrona kresów (IX 1918 – I 1919)." Koło Kombatantów przy AGH. Kraków, 2017.
- "2. Początkowy etap wojny polsko-bolszewickiej (II - XII 1919)." Koło Kombatantów przy AGH. Kraków, 2017.
- Short entry from Encyklopedia Interia (in Polish)

==== Books ====
- Waligóra, Bolesław (1938). Walka o Wilno: okupacja Litwy i Białorusi w 1918–1919 r. przez Rosję Sowiecką [The Fight for Vilnius: the Soviet Russian Occupation of Lithuania and Belarus in 1918–1919] (in Polish). Vilnius.
