= Michał Stanisław Kossakowski =

Polish diplomat (1883–1962)

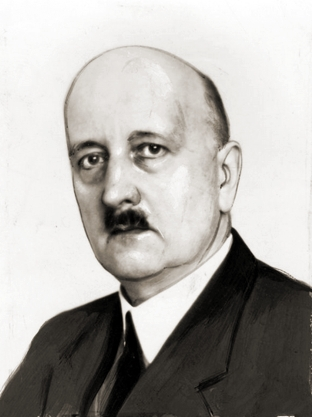
- Kossakowski in 1932

- Coat of arms
- Born: November 26, 1883; Warsaw, Congress Poland
- Died: January 23, 1962 (aged 78); Brwinów, Polish People's Republic
- Noble family: Kossakowski
- Spouse: Elżbieta Galen-Bisping (1882–1975)
- Issue: Maria, Jadwiga, Elżbieta, Józef, Anna, Michalina, Jan, Stanisław
- Father: Stanisław Kazimierz Kossakowski
- Mother: Michalina z Zaleskich

Michał Stanisław Kossakowski (born November 26, 1883 in Warsaw, died January 23, 1962 in Brwinów) – Polish–Lithuanian landowner, diplomat, banker.

== Early life (1883–1915) ==
=== Family and studies ===
The son of Stanisław Kazimierz Kossakowski and Michalina née Zaleska, he graduated from a secondary school in Warsaw. After graduating from the Władysław IV Gymnasium in Warsaw, he studied at the Faculty of Agriculture at the Riga Polytechnical Institute. During his studies, he became a member of the Arkonia Academic Fraternity. He continued his studies at the University of Fribourg, Switzerland (political economy and legal studies), but did not complete them because he had to attend to his estate and family matters.

Owner of the Lyduokiai estate in the Kaunas Governorate. From 1906, honorary justice of the peace of the Ukmergė County and a member of numerous charitable organizations.

== 1915–1920 ==
In 1915, he worked for the Central Citizens' Committee and the Polish Committee for Sanitary Aid in Kyiv and Minsk. In the latter, he was a member of the Polish Council of the Minsk Region, served as administrator of the Emilia Plater School, the Association of Enthusiasts of the Polish Stage, the Literary Society, and the Polish Daily. He also organized the Society of Friends of the Polish Soldier, the Society of Scientific Knowledge, and the "Kościuszko Commemoration."

=== 1918 ===
After the Imperial German Army entered Minsk, he organized the repatriation of refugees on behalf of the Ministry of Internal Affairs. In 1918, he organized landowners' meetings in Vilnius.

In December 1918, he participated in the Vilnius Self-Defence, and later headed the Borderlands' Defence Committee, was a delegate of the Polish National Council in Lithuania, and a member of the united Delegations of National Councils in Lithuania and Belarus.

=== 1919 ===
In 1919, he served as commissioned representative of the Civil Administration of the Eastern Lands, its deputy, and head of the Warsaw branch. He then served as delegate to negotiations with representatives of Soviet Russia regarding the exchange of prisoners of war, political prisoners, and hostages.

=== 1920 ===
In 1920, he served as delegate of the Ministry of Foreign Affairs to Riga. He volunteered in the Polish Army, then served as delegate of the Ministry of Foreign Affairs to General Lucjan Żeligowski, and as head of the Central Lithuanian Affairs Office at the Polish Ministry of Foreign Affairs.

== Interwar ==
After leaving the civil service, he served as director and vice-president of Bank Zachodni and chairman of the Council of the United Landowners' Bank in Warsaw. From 1935, director of the Kraków branch, and from 1938, director of the Poznań branch of Bank Polski SA.

Author of the "Diary," covering the period from 1915 to 1922, a valuable source of socio-political facts for researchers of that period. The first volume (two parts) of the Diary was published with historical commentary, edited by M. Mądzik, by the Maria Curie-Skłodowska University Press in 2010. The second and third volumes were edited by M. Korzeniowski, D. Tarasiuk, and K. Latawiec in 2016.

== Orders and decorations ==
- Commander's Cross of the Order of Polonia Restituta (November 7, 1925)
- Cross of Independence (December 29, 1933)
- Cross of Valour (May 12, 1921)
- Golden Cross of Merit (January 13, 1939)

== Bibliography ==
- Wojciech Morawski, Słownik Historyczny Bankowości Polskiej, Muza S.A., 1998.
- Cieślak, Tadeusz (1969). "Michał Stanisław Kossakowski". Polski Słownik Biograficzny. Vol. XIV. p. 282.
- „Księga Pamiątkowa Arkonii 1879–1979”
- Diariusz 1915–1922, Michał Stanisław Kossakowski, maszynopis w Archiwum Polskiej Akademii Nauk, Warsaw.
- Diariusz 21 maja - 31 sierpnia 1915, Michał Stanisław Kossakowski, Wydawnictwo UMCS, 2010 r., ISBN 978-83-227-3005-8.
- Diariusz 1 września 1915 - 4 lutego 1916, Michał Stanisław Kossakowski, Wydawnictwo UMCS, 2010 r. ISBN 978-83-227-3240-3.
- Diariusz 29 kwietnia - 31 grudnia 1917, Michał Stanisław Kossakowski, Wydawnictwo UMCS, 2016 r. ISBN 978-83-7784-877-7.
- Diariusz 1 stycznia - 31 grudnia 1918, Michał Stanisław Kossakowski, Wydawnictwo UMCS, 2016 r. ISBN 978-83-7784-878-4.
