= Mikhanavichy =

Mikhanavichy (Belarusian: Міханавічы, romanized: Michanavičy) or Mikhanovichi (Russian: Михановичи) may refer to the following places in Belarus:

- Mikhanavichy (agrotown), agrotown in Minsk District, Minsk Region
- Mikhanavichy (village), village in Minsk District, Minsk Region
- Mikhanavichy (station), railway station in Minsk District
- Mikhanavichy (cemetery), cemetery in Minsk
