= Hozha =

Agrotown in Grodno Region, Belarus

Hozha Гожа
- Agrotown
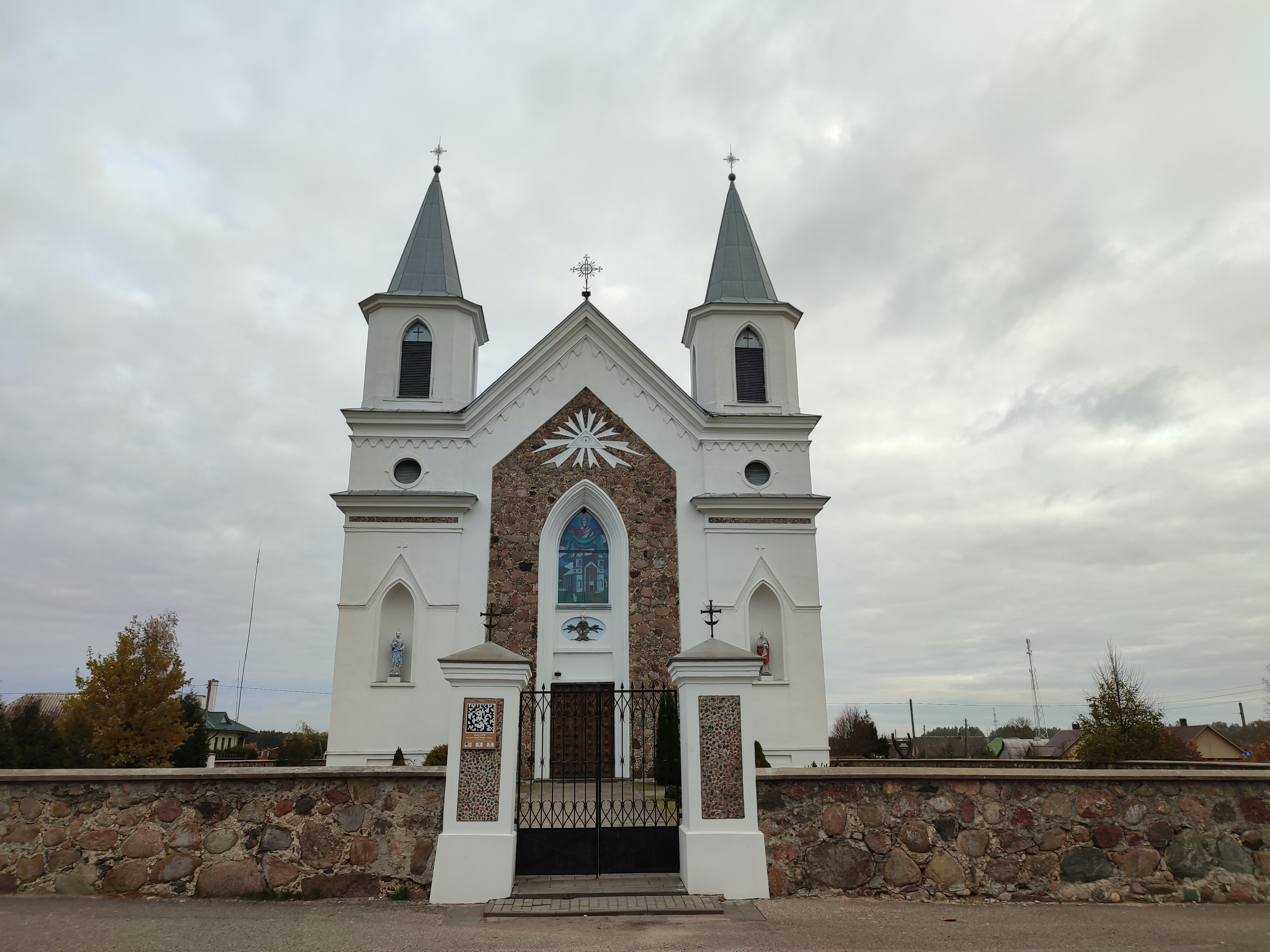
- Saints Peter and Paul church

- Location within Belarus
- Coordinates: 53°48′52″N 23°51′32″E
- Country: Belarus
- Region: Grodno Region
- District: Grodno District
- Time zone: UTC+3 (MSK)

Hozha (Belarusian: Гожа; Russian: Гожа, romanized: Gozha; Polish: Hoża) is an agrotown in Grodno District, Grodno Region, in western Belarus.

== History ==
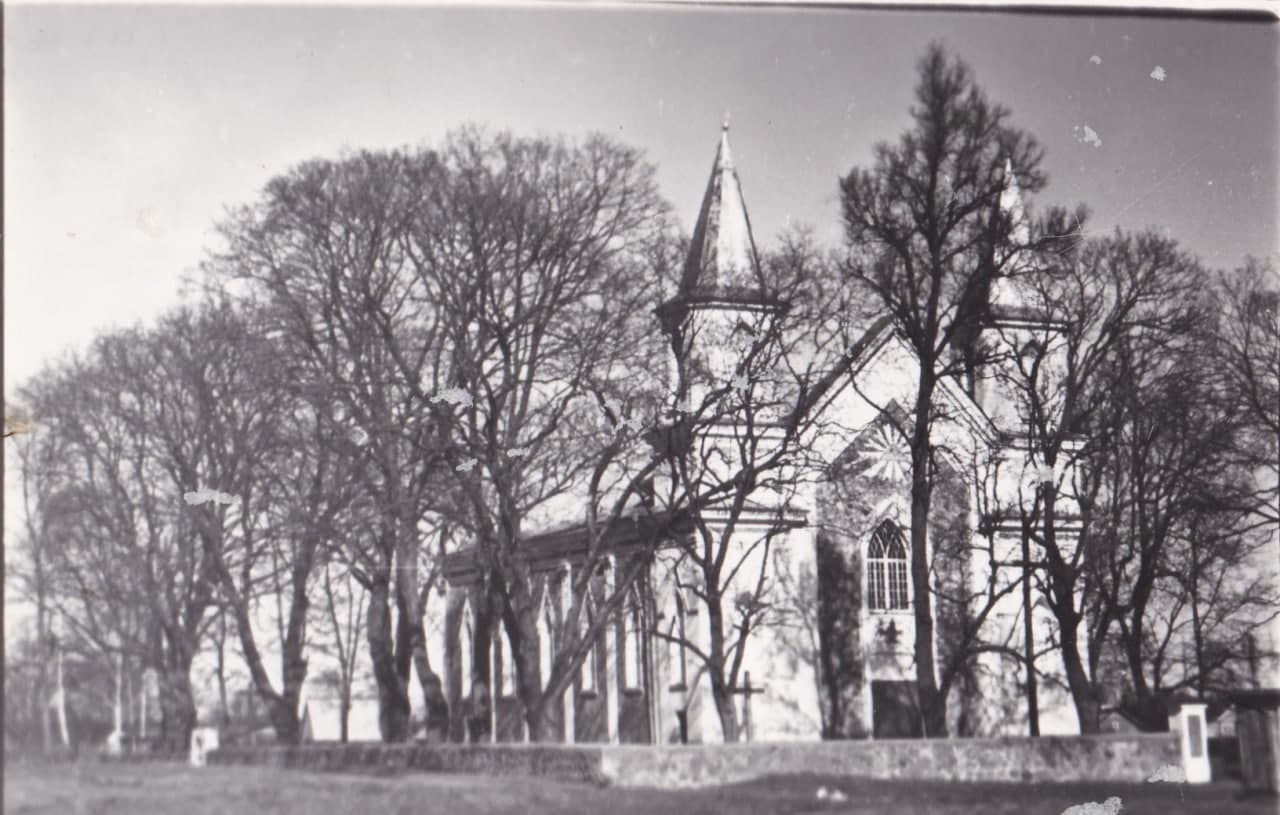
Saints Peter and Paul church in the 1930s

In the interwar period, Hoża, as it was known in Polish, was administratively located in the Grodno County in the Białystok Voivodeship of Poland. According to the 1921 census, the village with the adjacent manor farm had a population of 556, entirely Polish by nationality, and 99.1% Catholic, 0.54% Orthodox and 0.36% Jewish by confession.

Following the invasion of Poland in September 1939, Hoża was first occupied by the Soviet Union until 1941, then by Nazi Germany until 1944, and then re-occupied by the Soviet Union, which eventually annexed it from Poland in 1945. A local Polish forester was murdered by the Russians in the Katyn massacre in 1940.
