= Borderlands' Defence Committee =

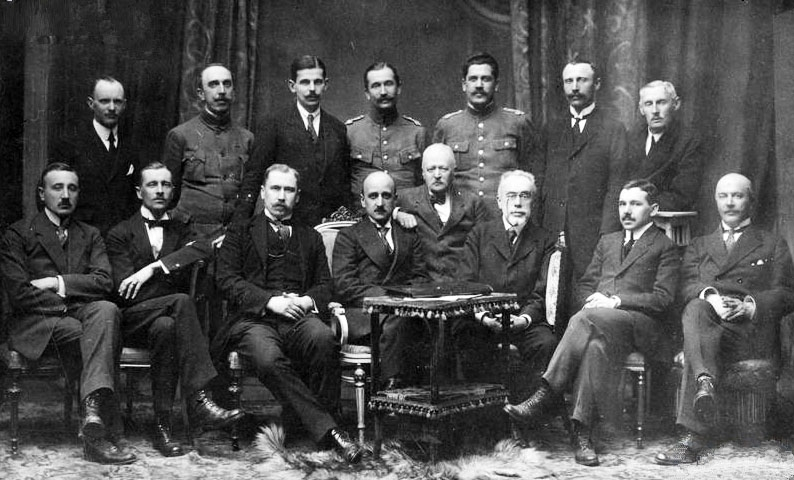
Borderlands' Defence Committee. Seated from left: Olgierd Gordziałkowski, Władysław Raczkiewicz, Mirosław Obiezierski, Michał Kossakowski. Also visible: Michał Obiezierski, Czesław Krasicki, Ignacy Witkiewicz, Władysław Marian Zawadzki (sitting 2nd from right), Wacław Wasilewski, Antoni Jundziłł, Marjan Parafianowicz, Czesław Krupski, Mieczysław Boguszewski, Witold Pusłowski, Emanuel Obrąpalski

The Borderlands' Defence Committee (Polish: Komitet Obrony Kresów Wschodnich also known as Komitet Obrony Kresów, abbr. KOK) was established in late November 1918 in Warsaw. It emerged from the so-called Lithuanian Committee, established in the same city in early 1917. The committee's office was in the Długa Street, Warsaw.

It provided political patronage for the emerging volunteer military self-defense units of the pro-Polish Self-Defence of Lithuania and Belarus. The incorporation of the division into the Polish Army was achieved on November 26, 1918, when Chief of State Józef Piłsudski agreed to the creation of such a division.

Together with the Polish National Council of White Ruthenia and Livonia, the Borderlands' Defence Committee sent a thank-you address to Piłsudski for the Polish victory during the Vilnius offensive in April 1919.

Władysław Raczkiewicz was the committee's chairman.

== Bibliography ==
- Wyszczelski, Lech (2010). Wojna polsko-rosyjska 1919–1920 (in Polish). Vol. 1 (1 ed.). Warsaw: Bellona. p. 696. ISBN 978-83-11-11934-5.
- Filipow, Krzysztof (1988). "Samoobrona polska na Kresach Wschodnich 1918-1919" (PDF). Zeszyt Naukowy Muzeum Wojska (in Polish). 2.
