= Mikhanavichy (village) =

Village in Minsk Region, Belarus

Mikhanavichy Міханавічы (Belarusian) Михановичи (Russian)
- Village
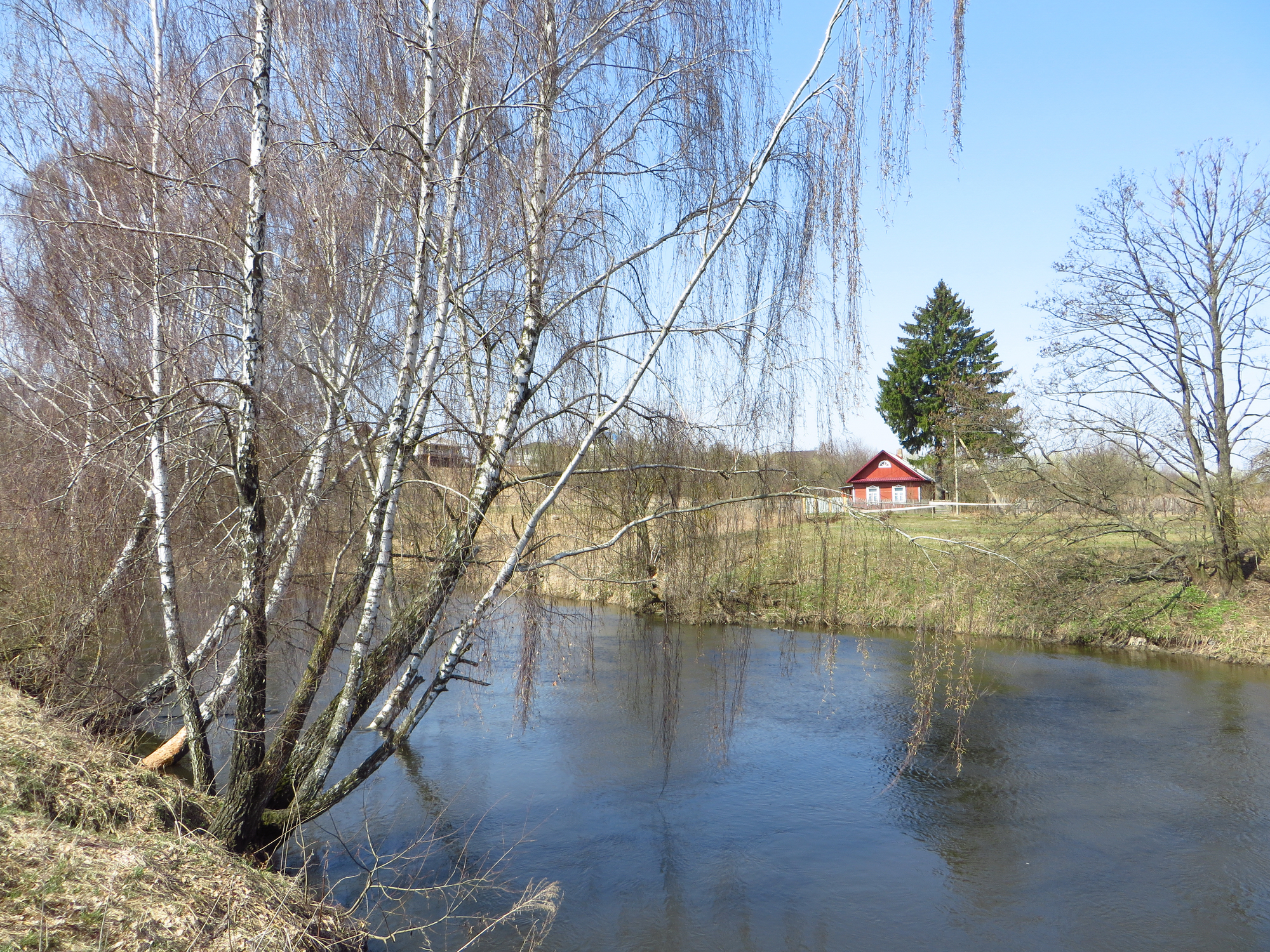

- Location within Belarus
- Coordinates: 53°45′25″N 27°43′43″E
- Country: Belarus
- Region: Minsk Region
- District: Minsk District

Population (2010)
  - Total: 331
- Time zone: UTC+3 (MSK)

Mikhanavichy (Belarusian: Міханавічы, romanized: Michanavičy; Russian: Михановичи, romanized: Mikhanovichi) is a village in Minsk District, Minsk Region, Belarus. It is administratively part of Mikhanavichy rural council. It is located 11 kilometres (6.8 mi) south of the capital Minsk and three kilometres (1.9 mi) away from the agrotown of Mikhanavichy. In 2010, it had a population of 331.
