= Mikhanavichy rural council =

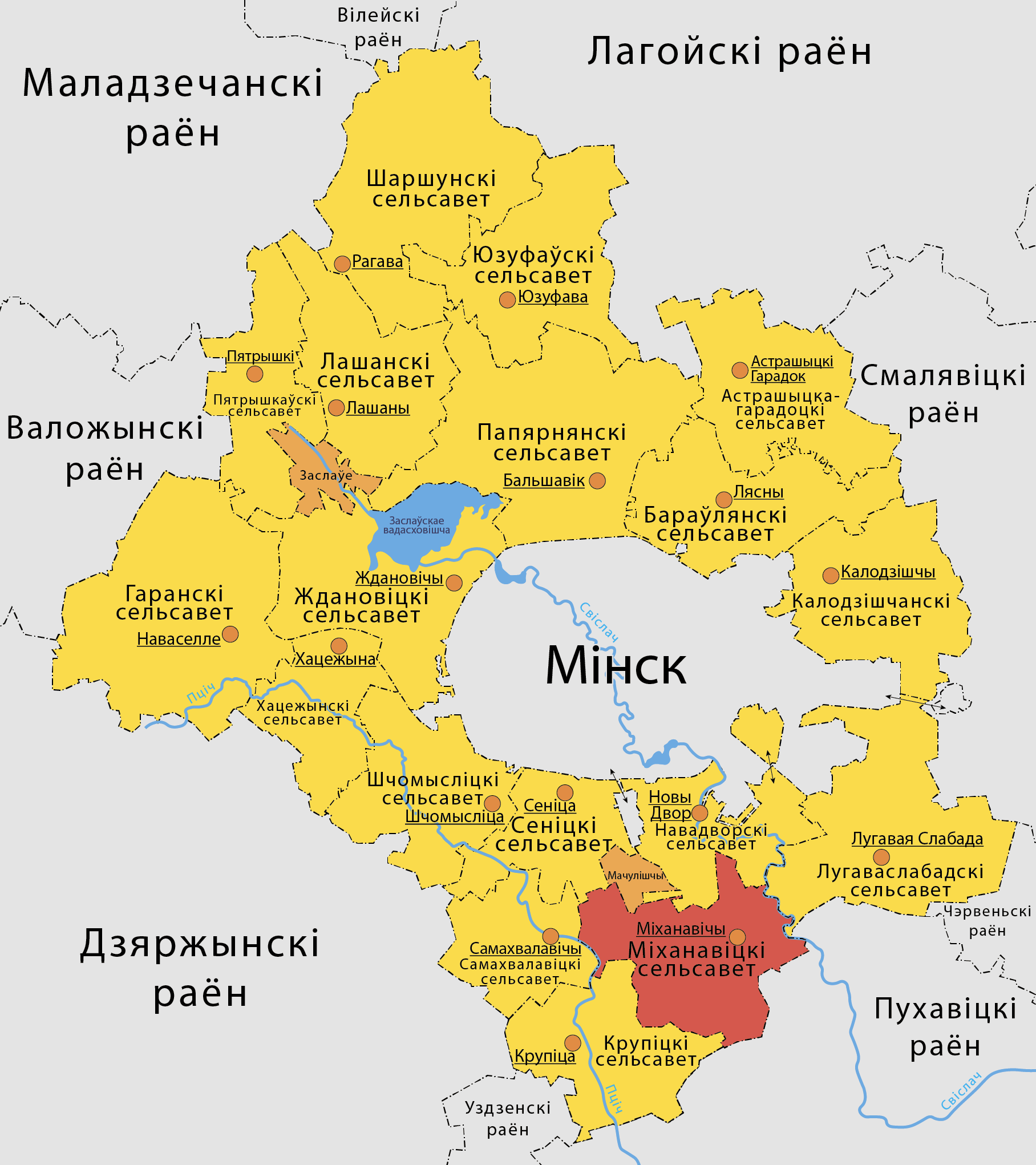
Map of Minsk District

Mikhanavichy rural council (Belarusian: Міханавіцкі сельсавет; Russian: Михановичский сельсовет) is a lower-level subdivision (selsoviet) of Minsk district, Minsk region, Belarus. Its administrative center is the agrotown of Mikhanavichy.

== Rural localities ==
The populations are from the 2009 Belarusian census (7177 total) and 2019 Belarusian census (9576 total)

Russian name	Belarusian name	Pop. 2009	Pop. 2019
д Алексеевка	в Аляксееўка	89	90
д Березина	в Беразіна	9	19
д Бордиловка	в Бардзілаўка	172	205
д Гребенка	в Грэбенка	21	46
п Дачный	п Дачны	-	278
д Дубовый Лес	в Дубовы Лес	41	43
д Кайково	в Кайкава	199	238
д Калинино	в Калініна	62	73
д Котяги	в Кацягі	247	331
д Михановичи (Mikhanovichi)	в Міханавічы (Mikhanavichy)	154	198
аг Михановичи (Mikhanovichi)	аг Міханавічы (Mikhanavichy)	4844	6572
д Пересека	в Пярэсека	13	14
д Плебанцы	в Плябанцы	175	169
д Серафимово	в Серафімова	485	430
аг Чуриловичи	аг Чурылавічы	666	870
