= Agro-town =

Town whose workforce's main occupation is agriculture

An agro-town is an agglomeration in a rural environment with a population of several thousands but whose workforce's main occupation is agriculture. An agro-town also lacks the administrative, commercial and industrial functions that are usually common in the centers of such size. This type of agglomeration is particularly present around the Mediterranean Sea, in West Africa, and in the Americas.

== Structure ==
The population of agro-towns are commonly very poor; most workers do not own the land and are employed seasonally as wage labour. This also explains why these populations are often very fluctuant, with a large immigration during harvest and a significant emigration during the low season or in case of crises. The concentration of the land in the hands of a small elite of often absentee landlords commonly leads to tensions within the towns, leading in the 20th century to a prevalence of the communist vote in many agro-towns in Mediterranean Europe.

Large landlords are typically absent and leave the management of their estates to agents who seldom live in the town but rather in large and prosperous farmhouses in the countryside (known as masia). On the other hand, landless wage labourers often travel large distances to reach the location of their employer. Despite the relative abundance of labour, the surrounding exploitations tend to concentrate in non-labour-intensive cultures due to the supervision issue that arises with large labour forces. Consequently latifundia tend to specialize in capital-intensive cash crops, which often require the edification of large specialized buildings such as windmills or oil presses.

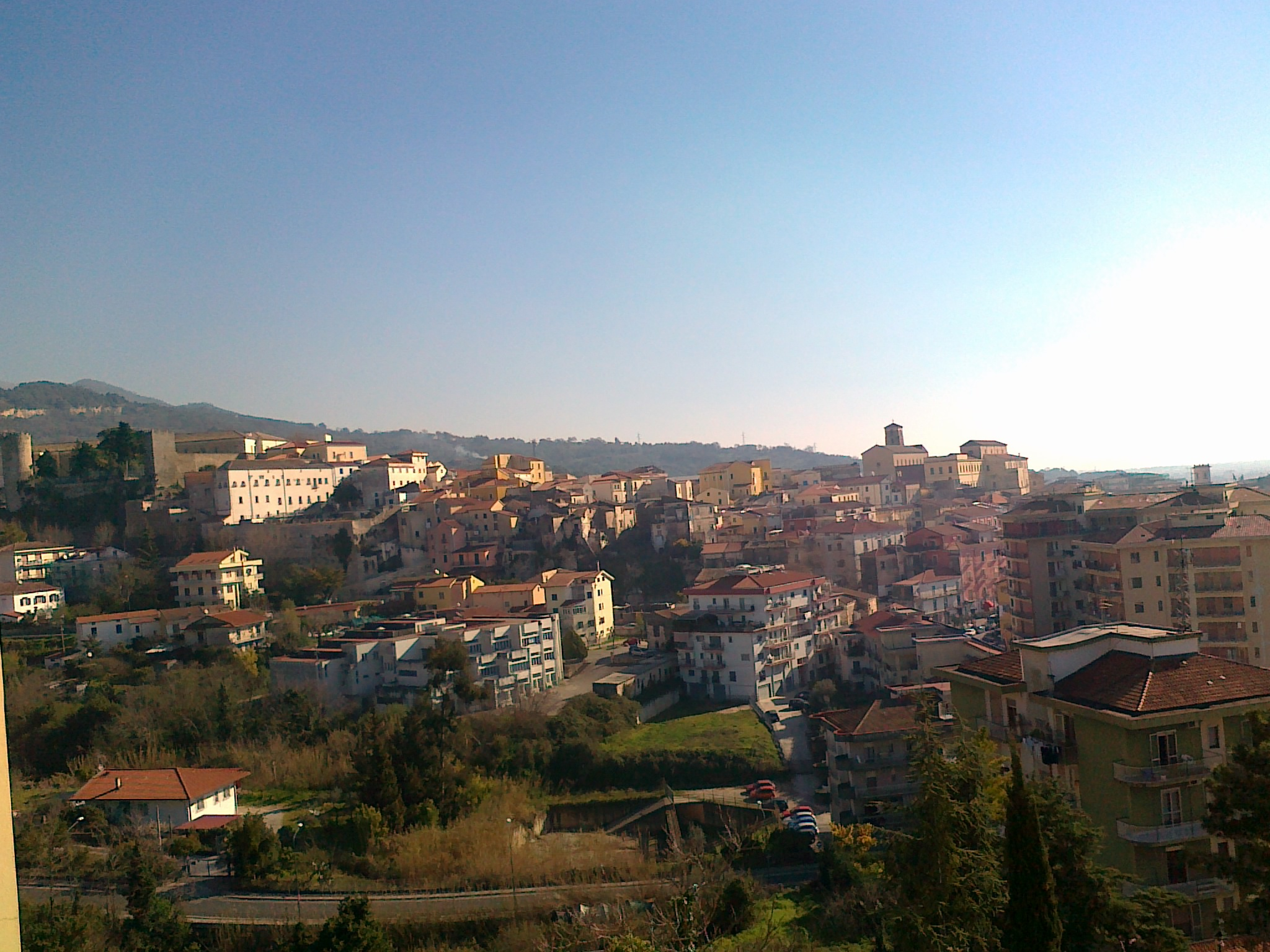
The center of Eboli

== Environmental causes ==
Such a peculiar and somewhat counter-intuitive type of agglomeration has led to a lot of speculation regarding their origin. Among the main theories regarding their emergence, the most common are related to their environment. Agro-towns being prevalent in warm environments, it's been pointed out that they tended to emerge where water was rare and the population had to cluster around a well. Another factor that is commonly mentioned to explain the rise of agro-towns is the higher salubrity of the site of the agglomeration. The prevalence of malaria in wetlands implied that it was healthier to live in higher ground, which may have led to a concentration of the population on some hills. Incidentally, higher ground and concentrated habitat also provide good defensive positions, which may have played a role in regions where marauders and pirates were a threat to isolated farms.

== Economic causes ==
In some regions agro-towns were close to broader habitats and that consequently environmental causes could not alone explain the emergence of agro-towns; instead there was a historical evolution which led to the concentration of the population into a few urban centers. In this view, small farmers were gradually driven off their land by larger landowners and had to seek refuge in towns, where they became wage labourers for those same large landowners. This process would explain why agro-towns are mostly in regions dominated by latifundia and the high level of tension between the town residents and the landlords. As the most fertile lands are the most likely to attract large investors, agro-towns may be seen as a version of the resource curse, as more productive lands lead to a high level of misery among the population.

== Examples of agro-towns ==
=== Italy ===
- Eboli
- Trapani
- Pisticci

=== Portugal ===
- Alvito

=== Spain ===
- Alcala

=== Belarus ===
- Mikhanovichi
