= Proclamation to the inhabitants of the former Grand Duchy of Lithuania =

1919 proclamation by Polish leader Józef Piłsudski

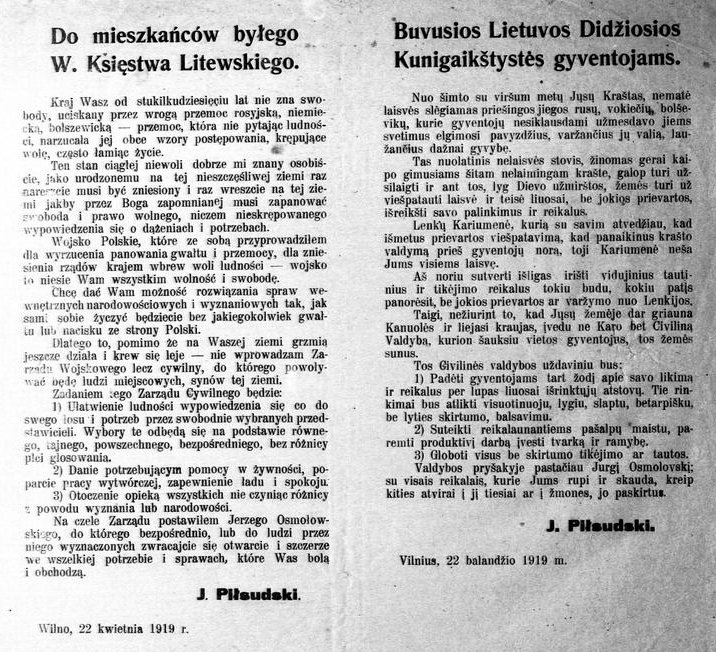
Piłsudski's bilingual proclamation To the Inhabitants of the Former Grand Duchy of Lithuania (April 22, 1919)

The Proclamation to the Inhabitants of the Former Grand Duchy of Lithuania was a bilingual proclamation, formulated by Józef Piłsudski and distributed mainly in Vilnius (Wilno) on April 22, 1919. The proclamation was printed in the Polish and Lithuanian languages after Polish forces captured Vilnius in the Vilna offensive during the Polish–Soviet War. It was a statement of Piłsudski's political intentions, and contained a blueprint for his Międzymorze federation. The declaration was sharply criticized by both Polish and Lithuanian nationalists.

In issuing the proclamation bilingually, Piłsudski was appealing to the Lithuanians, hoping to recreate the Polish–Lithuanian Commonwealth. The style of the proclamation, the ideas contained within it, and the dramatic turn of phrase were definitely Piłsudski's, and reflected his position on the political and military situation he wished to resolve. Piłsudski pledged to ordain "elections which would take place on the basis of secret, universal and direct voting, without distinction between the sexes" and to "create an opportunity for settling your nationality problems and religious affairs in a manner that you yourself will determine, without any kind of force or pressure from Poland."

Piłdudski's proclamation was aimed at showing good will both to Lithuanians and international diplomats. It succeeded with the latter, as the proclamation dealt a blow to the image of 'Polish conquest' and replaced it with the image of 'Poland fighting with Bolshevik dictatorship and liberating other nations'. However, the Lithuanians who demanded exclusive control over the city saw the proclamation as a facade for Polish imperialism. Piłsudski's words also caused much controversy on the Polish political scene as they were not debated in the Sejm. This caused much anger among Piłsudski's opponents from the National Democracy faction. Deputies from Polish People's Party demanded incorporation of the Vilnius Region into Poland, and even accused Piłsudski of treason. However Piłsudski's supporters in the Polish Socialist Party managed to deflect those attacks.

== See also ==
- 1919 Polish coup d'état attempt in Lithuania
- Republic of Central Lithuania
