= Waldemar Rezmer =

Polish historian and professor

Waldemar Rezmer (born 1949) is a Polish historian. A professor at the Nicolaus Copernicus University in Toruń, he specializes in modern military history, particularly Polish, Lithuanian and Soviet.
