= 1st Lithuanian–Belarusian Division =

1918–1923 Polish Army combat formation

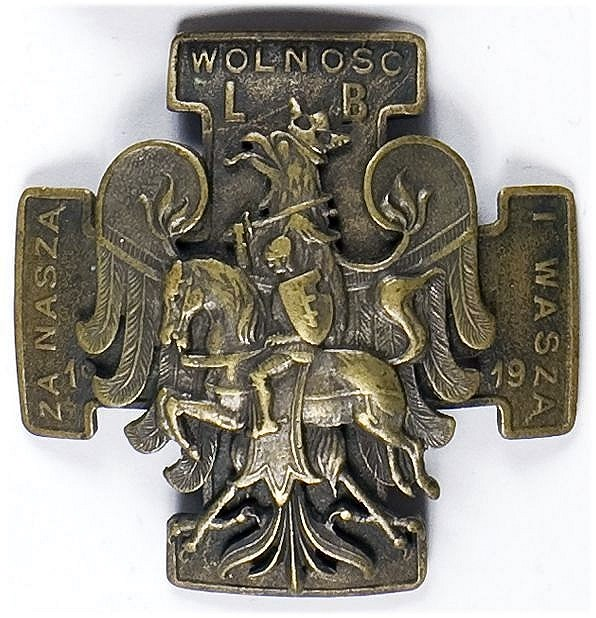
1st Lithuanian–Belarusian Division

The 1st Lithuanian–Belarusian Division (Polish: 1. Dywizja Litewsko-Białoruska, 1.DL-B; Belarusian: 1-ая Літоўска-Беларуская дывізія; Lithuanian: 1-oji Lietuvos-Baltarusijos divizija) was a volunteer unit of the Polish Army formed around December 1918 and January 1919 during the Polish–Soviet War. It was created out of several dozen smaller units of self-defence forces composed of local volunteers in what is now Lithuania and Belarus, amidst a growing series of territorial disputes between the Second Polish Republic, the Russian SFSR, and several other local provisional governments. The Division took part in several key battles of the war. According to Lithuanian intelligence gathered in summer 1920 from questioning soldiers from the Polish army, around 15-18% of some units in the division's were possibly composed of ethnic Lithuanians.

== History ==
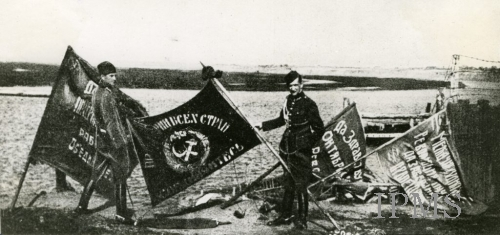
The Battle of Warsaw, the most important battle of the war, was one of the battles the 1st Lithuanian-Belarusian Infantry Division took part in.

With the end of the World War I in the West, a growing series of territorial disputes between Poland, Soviet Russia and several other local provisional governments erupted in a series of wars in Central and Eastern Europe, the most prominent of these being the Polish–Soviet War. Starting in the last years of the First World War, many smaller units of self-defence forces were created out of local volunteers in those areas, among them likely the best known being the Lithuanian and Belarusian Self-Defence (Samoobrona Litwy i Białorusi). Self-Defence units were organized in the areas of the Kresy region with Polish majorities or significant minorities – usually urbanized areas like the cities of Vilnius, Minsk, Hrodna, Lida and Kaunas, or towns like Ašmiany, Wilejka, Nemenčinė, Świr and Panevėžys; until December 1918 those units had no central command or organization and many of them were named after the local cities or regions (like Samoobrona Lidy). The first task of those units was curbing the crime wave by German deserters, and later, defence from the pro-Bolshevik groups. Despite its name, most of the members of that organization were either Poles or polonized, and therefore supported the cause of attaching those territories with the newly recreated Polish state.

Regarding the division, Michał Pius Römer wrote in his diary on December 9, 1918, that:

the "Lithuanian-Belarusian" division, which is being formed and supposedly intended to eventually "rescue" Lithuania, in reality, harbors the seeds of a military annexation.

=== Operational history ===
The initial core of the division was formed in December 1918 in Minsk, where a group of roughly 1,500 Poles and Belarusians rose to arms to defend the city against the advancing forces of Soviet Russia. In June 1919, the Bolsheviks deployed the Jewish 1st Guard Battalion from Minsk (at the insistence of its own members) against the Polish Army which included the 1st and the 2nd Lithuanian–Belarusian Divisions. The pro-communist Jews had won the first skirmish, forcing the Poles and Belarusians to retreat several kilometers. On August 8, 1919, Polish troops recaptured Minsk from the Bolsheviks. The main attack was in the direction of Maladzechna, Minsk, and Polatsk along the railroad lines. However, due to Russian numerical superiority and lack of support from the side of the short-lived Belarusian People's Republic, the group withdrew towards central Poland. Other such self-defence groups, resistance organizations, and veterans of the Green Army of the Russian Civil War also reached Poland, where they were reformed into a single unit under the command of general Władysław Wejtko formerly from the Imperial Russian Army.

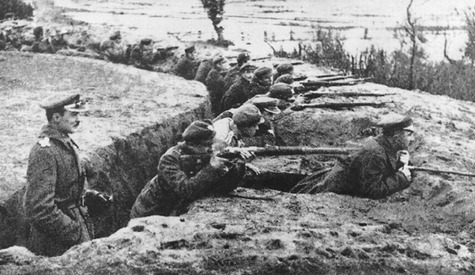
1st Lithuanian-Belarusian Infantry Division suffered heavy losses in the Battle of Niemen.

Another large group of volunteers to join the division were the remnants of roughly 2,500 men strong force created in Vilnius to defend it against the Reds in January 1919. In the effect of four-day-long fights for the city and the area of Naujoji Vilnia, the Polish forces were pushed back and the city had to be abandoned. The newly formed division took part in the Battle of Brześć Litewski of January 8 of that year, one of the first battles of the Polish–Soviet War.

The division, commanded by Gen. Jan Rządkowski, took part in many of the largest battles of that conflict. Among others, it played a major role in the Battle of Radzymin, a part of the Battle of Warsaw, the decisive struggle of the war. It also took part in the Battle of the Niemen, where it suffered heavy losses. Finally, after the League of Nations-brokered Suwałki Agreement, the units of the division – then commanded by Gen. Lucjan Żeligowski – occupied the Vilnius Region from the Lithuanian forces and formed the core of the armed forces of the disputed Republic of Central Lithuania.

Following the elections held in Polish-occupied Vilnius and the state merger with Poland in 1923, the division was partially demobilized, while its remnants were incorporated into the Polish 19th Infantry Division stationed in Vilnius.

=== Composition ===
- 81st Grodno Rifles Regiment
- 10th Lithuanian Uhlan Regiment

== 2nd Lithuanian–Belarusian Division ==
Parts of the 1st Lithuanian–Belarusian Division (1.DL-B) were transferred, in July 1919, to form the parallel 2nd Lithuanian–Belarusian Division (Polish: 2. Dywizja Litewsko-Białoruska, 2.DL-B) of the Polish Army. The division suffered heavy casualties during the Soviet invasion in summer 1920; some soldiers were forced to retreat into Lithuanian territory where they were interned by the Bolsheviks. The division was soon reinforced and renamed as the 20th Infantry Division. It temporarily returned to the old name of the 2nd Division after Żeligowski's Mutiny, when it became part of the Army of Central Lithuania.

== Citations and references ==
=== Cited sources ===
- Pacevičius, Paulius (2014). "Lietuvos kariuomenės dezertyrai nepriklausomybės kovų ir valstybingumo įtvirtinimo laikotarpiu 1918–1923 m. [Chapter: Dezertyrai svetimų valstybių kariuomenėse, veikusiose Lietuvoje 1919–1920 m.]". Karo Archyvas (in Lithuanian). XXIX. Vilnius: Generolo Jono Žemaičio Lietuvos Karo Akademija. ISSN 1392-6489.
