= Operation Minsk =

1919 battle of the Polish–Soviet War

- Part of Polish–Soviet War
- Polish-Soviet War & Lithuanian-Soviet War of 1919: map showing Polish & Lithuanian counterattacks.
Date	Early August, 1919
Location	Near Minsk, modern Belarus
Result	Polish victory
Territorial changes	Poles take Barysaw and Babruysk

Belligerents
Poland	Russian SFSR

Commanders and leaders
Stanisław Szeptycki	Vasily Glagolev

Strength
14,000 men 40 guns	Unknown

Casualties and losses
Unknown	Unknown but heavy

Operation Mińsk was a military offensive of the Polish Army during the Polish–Soviet War. It resulted in the capture of Minsk from the Red Army around 8 August 1919. The victory allowed the Polish troops to advance further into Russian-controlled Lithuania and Belarus and thus to present the Bolsheviks with a military fait accompli. The main Polish attack was toward Maladzyechna, Minsk, and Polotsk along the railroad lines. On 6 August, the Polish Army took over Slutsk and Minsk was taken two days later. The Polish units fought under command of General Stanisław Szeptycki. Polish control over the railway lines prevented the Russians from bringing in reinforcements. By the end of August, the Polish forces had taken Barysaw and Babruysk.

The main military campaigns of the Polish–Soviet War took place in 1920.

== Background ==
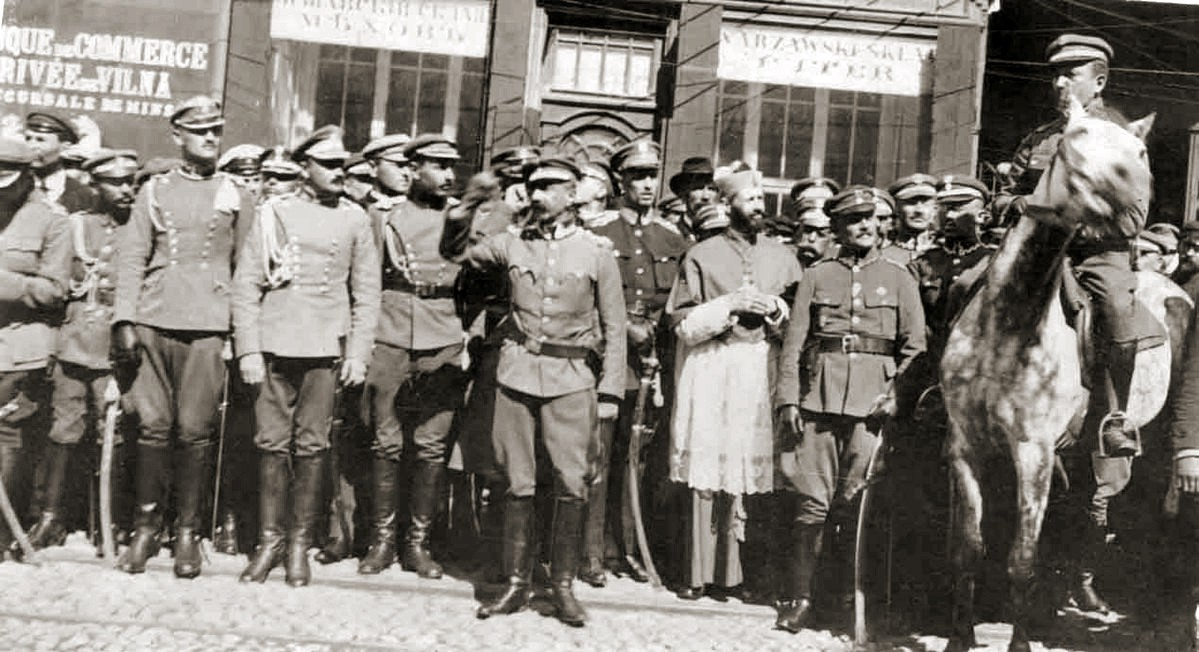
Polish officers in Minsk in August 1919

In early 1919, the eastern front of the Directorate of Ukraine collapsed, and by spring, the Ukrainian war of independence had failed under attack from all sides, including by the White armies. In the summer of 1919, after the Polish successes in several skirmishes with the Soviet forces, both combatants were engaged on multiple fronts, were near the limits of their capability to wage war against each other and needed time to regroup and to concentrate their forces.

In June 1919, the Jewish 1st Guard Battalion from Minsk, at the insistence of its own members, was deployed by the Bolsheviks against the Polish Army, which included the 1st and 2nd Lithuanian–Belarusian Divisions. The Jews had won the first skirmish, which forced the Poles to retreat several kilometers.

== Battle ==
In July, the Polish High Command decided to strike one more blow against the Bolsheviks and to cripple the Russian Army's Western Division, headquartered in Minsk. The assault on the vital railway centre by the Polish Northern Group was led by General Stanisław Szeptycki, whose officers included Władysław Anders, Józef Adam Lasocki and Stefan Mokrzecki. Their forces were composed of 12,000 infantry, 2,000 cavalry and 40 guns. The Polish plan involved a wide pincer movement around the city of Minsk. The battle raged throughout the first week of August. The Soviet forces took heavy casualties and retreated. On 8 August 1919, the Polish troops took over Minsk.

== Aftermath ==
Perhaps as retribution for the actions of the Jewish regiments, the Polish troops killed 31 Jews suspected of supporting the Bolsheviks, beat and attacked many more, looted 377 Jewish-owned shops with the aid of the local civilians and ransacked many private homes.

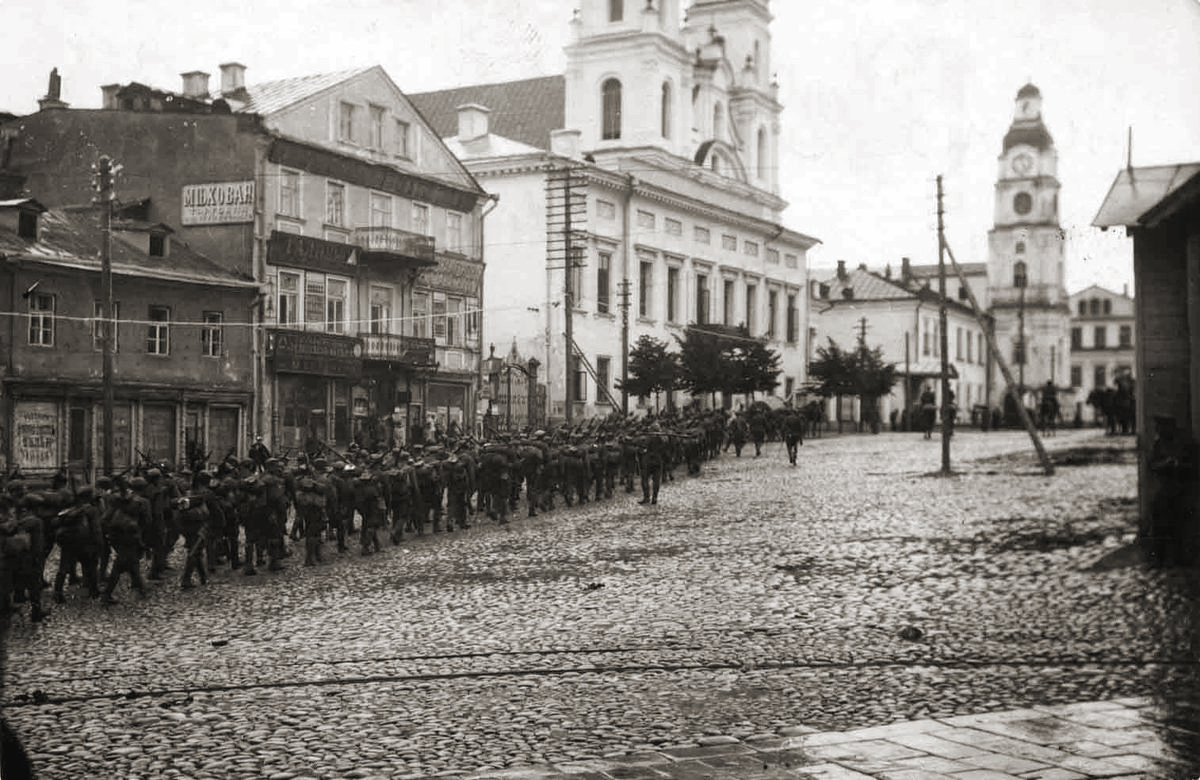
Polish soldiers in Minsk in August 1919

The success of the Polish offensive allowed the Poles to move forward again. In late summer, Polish Commander-in-chief Józef Piłsudski had ordered his armies to stop their offensive, as he considered that all the territories that were important to Poland and could be taken before winter had been secured. Piłsudski also wanted to release the Soviet forces engaged on the Polish front so they could be used to fight the advancing Whites.
