= Mikhanavichy (agrotown) =

Agrotown in Minsk Region, Belarus

Mikhanavichy Міханавічы (Belarusian) Михановичи (Russian)
- Agrotown
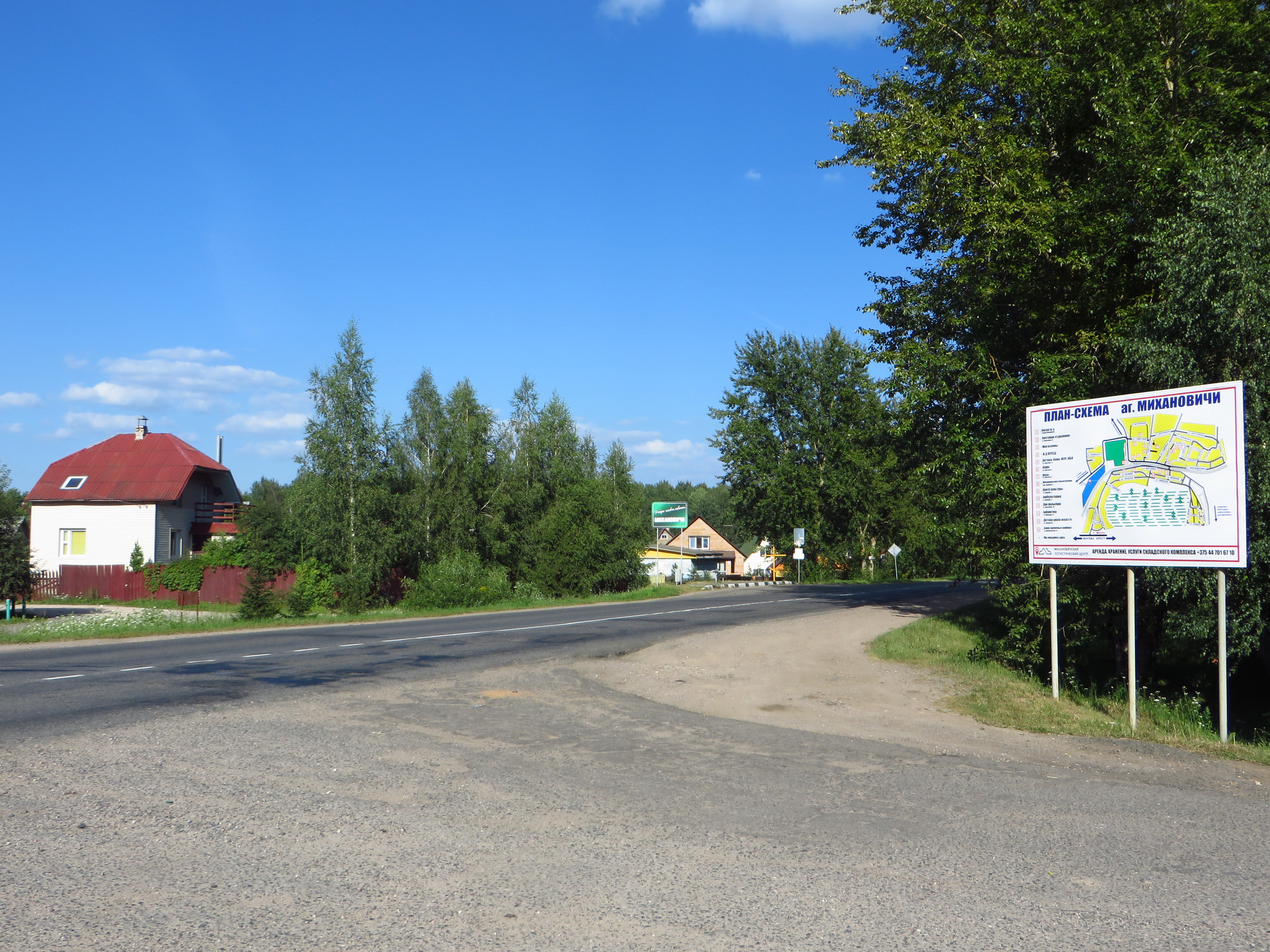

- Location within Belarus
- Coordinates: 53°44′23″N 27°41′24″E
- Country: Belarus
- Region: Minsk Region
- District: Minsk District

Population (2023)
  - Total: 11,351
- Time zone: UTC+3 (MSK)

Mikhanavichy (Belarusian: Міханавічы, romanized: Michanavičy; Russian: Михановичи, romanized: Mikhanovichi) is an agrotown in Minsk District, Minsk Region, Belarus. It serves as the administrative center of Mikhanavichy rural council. It is located 10 kilometres (6.2 mi) south of the capital Minsk. In 2023, it had a population of 11,351.
