= Władysław Wejtko =

Polish general (1859–1933)

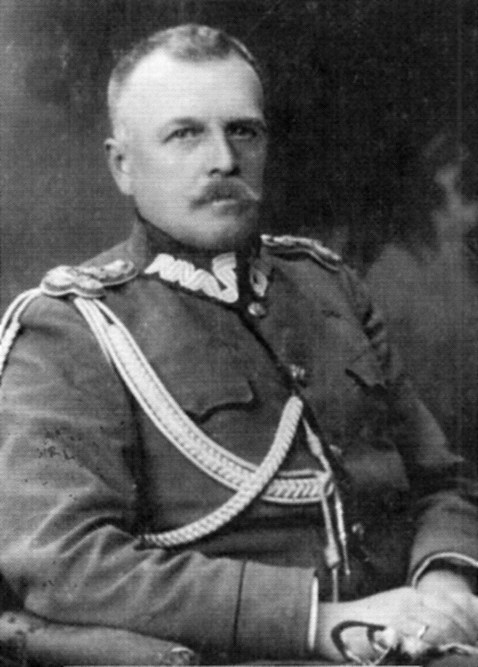
General Władysław Wejtko

Władysław Wejtko (1 February 1859 – 16 November 1933) was a Polish general of the Imperial Russian Army, and later of the Polish Army. He fought on the side of the Second Polish Republic as a major-general in Józef Piłsudski's forces during the Polish-Soviet War of 1919–1921.

== Biography ==
Born on February 1, 1859, to a Polish family in Livonia (Russian Empire), his family soon moved to the provinces surrounding the Black Sea, possibly as part of the repercussions facing Poles in the aftermath of the failed January Uprising.

He joined the Russian Army, becoming an officer in 1882 with a specialization in engineering. In 1898 he was promoted to the rank of captain. He fought in the Russo-Japanese War of 1905 and served in Siberia, where he took part in the construction of many roads and bridges. In 1914, soon after the First World War began, he was found guilty of violating the censorship laws, and was sent to the Russian-German front. There he took part in the negotiations for prisoner exchanges with Austria-Hungary, after which he served in units tasked with logistics and fortifications. In 1915 he was promoted to lieutenant general, but did not receive an independent command usually associated with the promotion in rank.

In 1917, during the Russian February Revolution, he found himself in St. Petersburg where he became one of the leaders of the Polish War Commission, and then one of the commanders of the Polish 1st Corps in Russia. In 1918 he organized the Lithuanian and Belarusian Self-Defence force and the 1st Lithuanian-Belarusian Division. On 8 December, he was officially accepted into the newly forming Polish Army by the order of Józef Piłsudski at the rank of major general. In 1919 he was sent for training in France, and in spring 1920 he became the Chief Inspector of Technical Forces (Generalny Inspektor Wojsk Technicznych). During the Polish-Soviet War, he worked with the French Military Mission to Poland and took part in the Battle of Warsaw, where he helped prepare Polish fortifications and defensive lines.

He retired in 1921. Until his death in 1933, he was an activist in many Polish organizations, including the Polish Red Cross, and was the author of many articles and several books. He died on 16 November 1933 and was buried in Nałęczów.

== Decorations ==
During his service he received the Commander's Cross of the Polonia Restituta, Cross of Valour (Krzyż Walecznych) (twice), and the French Order of the Légion d'honneur, Officier class.
