= Pabradė =

Pabradė Podbrodzie
- City
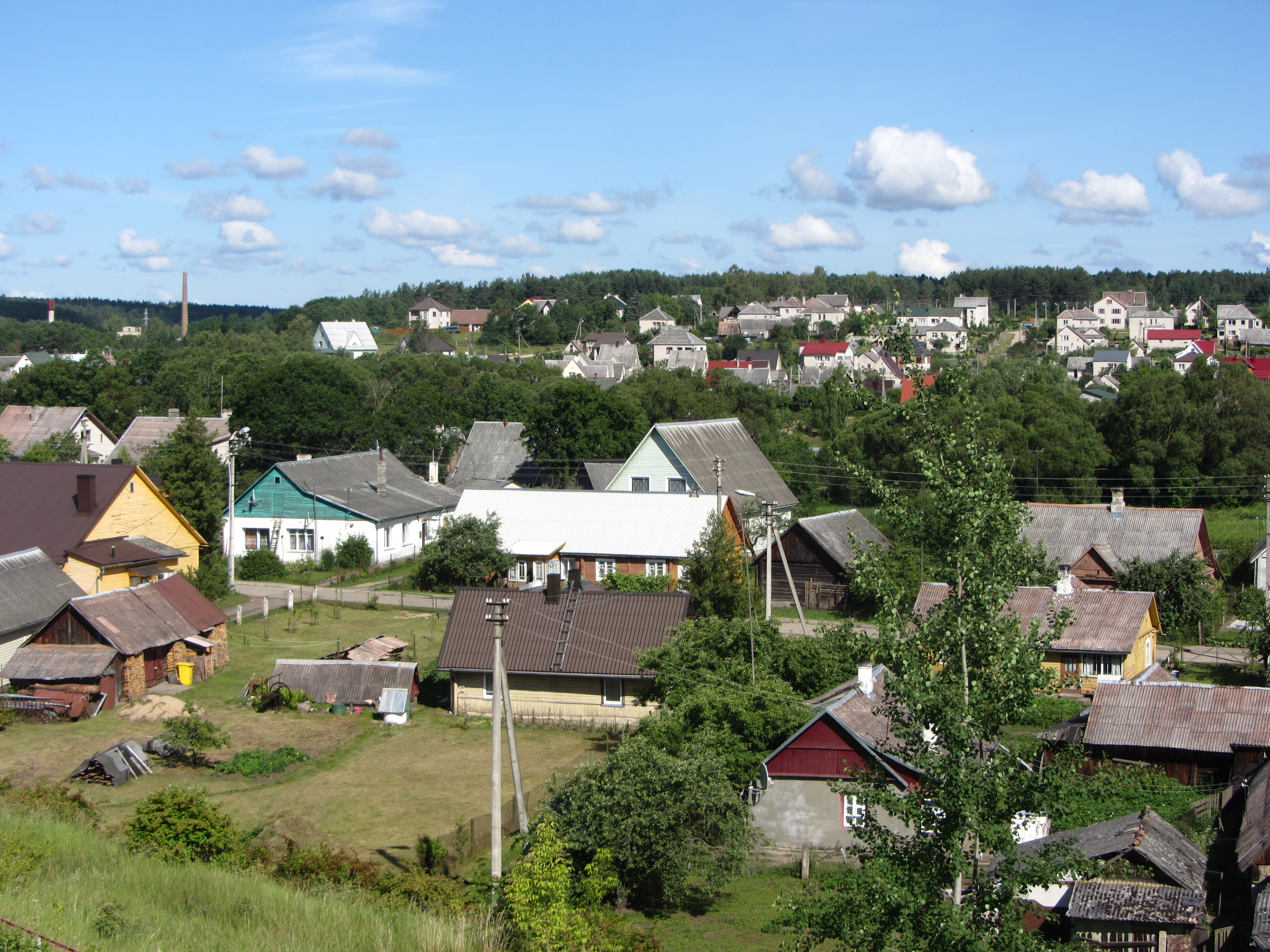

- Coat of arms

- Location of Pabradė
- Coordinates: 54°58′59″N 25°45′59″E
- Country: Lithuania
- Ethnographic region: Aukštaitija
- County: Vilnius County
- Municipality: Švenčionys district municipality
- Eldership: Pabradė eldership
- Capital of: Pabradė eldership
- First mentioned: 15th century
- City rights: 1946

Population (2021)
  - Total: 4,807
- Time zone: UTC+2 (EET)
  - Summer (DST): UTC+3 (EEST)

Pabradė (Polish: Podbrodzie; Yiddish: פּאָדבראָדז, romanized: Podbrodz) is a city in eastern Lithuania, in Švenčionys district municipality, on the Žeimena river, 38 km south-west of Švenčionys.

Pabradė Training Area, a major military facility, is located approximately 4 km north of the city. It recorded some of the most coldest temperatures in Lithuania, reaching -44.4 °C -47.9 °F in February 1 1956

== History ==
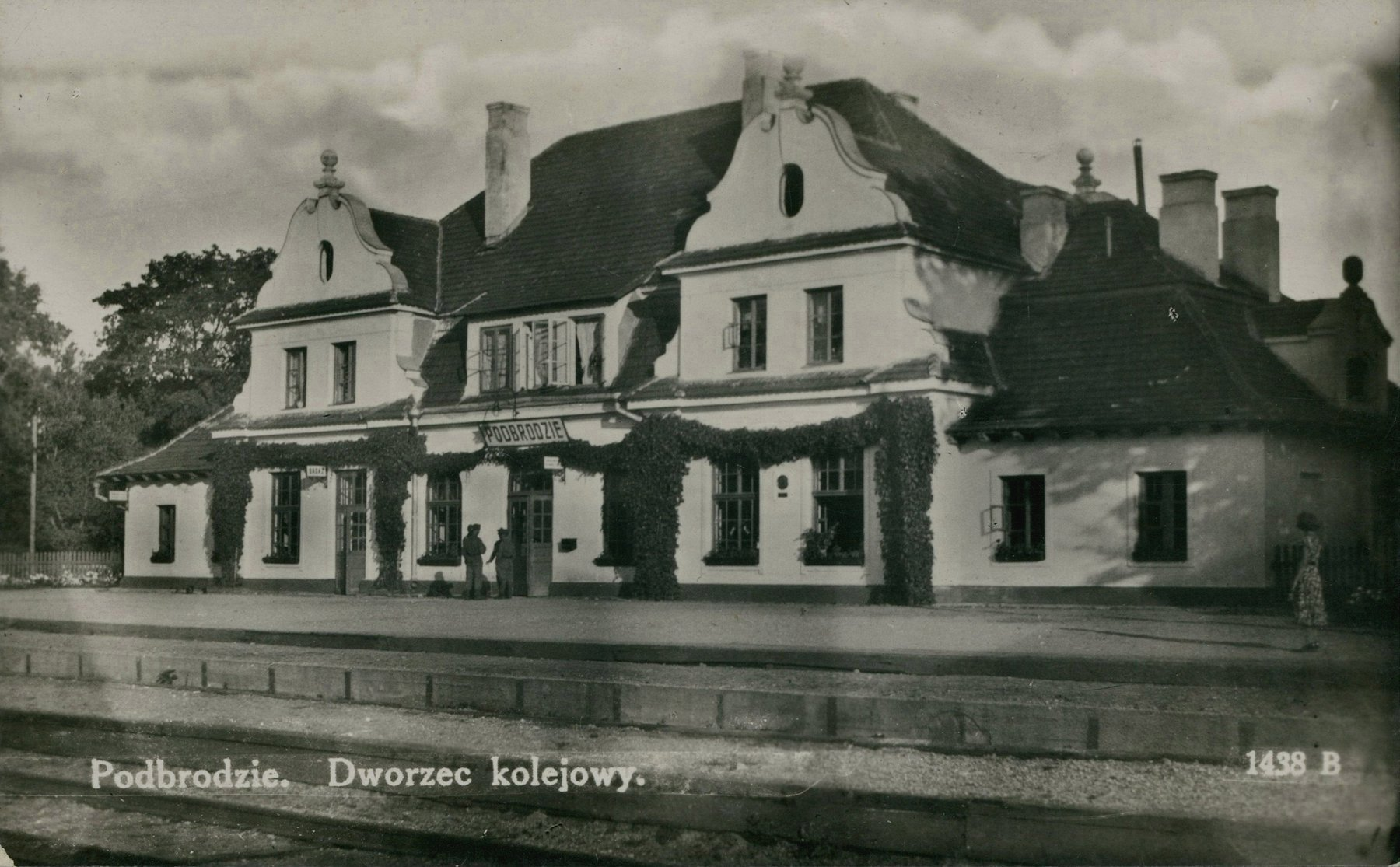
Railway station in the interbellum

It was quite a small settlement until the 19th century, when the Saint Petersburg–Warsaw Railway was built in 1862.

In the interwar period, Podbrodzie, as it was known in Polish, was administratively located in the Święciany County in the Wilno Voivodeship of Poland.

About 850 Jews lived in the town in 1939, comprising one third of the total population. After the joint German–Soviet invasion of Poland, which started World War II in September 1939, the town was occupied by the Soviets, who handed it over to Lithuania, to eventually re-occupy it in 1940. Several Poles from Podbrodzie were murdered by the Russians in the Katyn massacre in 1940. After June 1941, at the very beginning of the German occupation, about a dozen Jews were executed. In the middle of July, Lithuanian policemen arrested about 60 Jews and shot them behind the mill. On September 1, the rest of the Jewish population was moved into a ghetto that was established on two streets, previously inhabited by Christians. The ghetto was open, so many of its residents escaped at the end of the month, after rumors about the forthcoming Aktion had spread. Over 100 Jews who were interned in the ghetto or who were recaptured were escorted to the military training camp in Švenčionėliai and shot on October 8–10, along with thousands of other Jews assembled there. Policemen continued searching for Jewish escapees, gathered them in groups and shot them on the outskirts of town.

== Population ==
In 2011, the city's population was composed of Poles - 44.73% (2681), Lithuanians – 26.81% (1607), Russians - 18.45% (1106), Belarusians - 5.27% (316), Ukrainians - 1.17% (70), others - 3.57% (214).

== Transportation ==
The Vilnius–Daugavpils railway is constructed south of the city.

== See also ==
- Gaižiūnai
- Rukla
