= List of political parties in Poland =

This article provides a list of political parties in Poland, both current and historical, dating back to the Polish–Lithuanian Commonwealth. It includes parties that functioned in an independent Polish state, and does not cover party-like associations active during the partitions of Poland.

Political parties in Poland trace their origins to the Great Sejm of the late 18th century. The Patriotic Party (Polish: Stronnictwo Patriotyczne) is generally considered the first political party in the country, although the earlier Familia faction (1731–1795) has also been described as a proto-party. Following the restoration of Polish independence in November 1918, the Second Polish Republic adopted a party-based parliamentary system modeled on Western democracies, while also building on domestic political traditions. Despite the May Coup of 1926 and the subsequent establishment of the Sanation regime, political parties continued to operate, albeit under increasingly centralized and authoritarian control.

During the Second World War, the Provisional Government of the Republic of Poland was formed in 1944 under the State National Council, led by the Polish Workers' Party. This government transitioned into the Provisional Government of National Unity in 1945, and subsequently into the Polish People's Republic in 1952. In the People's Republic, multiple parties existed within the Sejm, but these operated under the control of umbrella organizations created by the ruling Party, effectively reducing them to satellite parties.

The collapse of communist rule in 1989 and the transition to liberal democracy in the early 1990s led to the emergence of numerous new political parties. These included both serious contenders and satirical groups, such as the Polish Beer-Lovers’ Party. The early post-communist period was marked by highly fragmented elections. In response, electoral reforms introduced prior to the 1993 parliamentary elections established thresholds of 5% for individual parties and 8% for coalitions at the national level (with exemptions for ethnic minority parties). These thresholds significantly reduced the success of minor parties and prevented independent candidates from entering the Sejm.

In the early years of the Third Republic, the left wing of Polish politics was dominated by former communists who had moderated their positions toward social democracy. In recent decades, however, the Polish left has been represented mainly by parties unconnected to the communist era and linked to the New Left across Europe, often reflecting trends seen across the European Union. At the same time, centrist and neoliberal groups such as Civic Platform have positioned themselves as center-left alternatives with success. The right wing, initially composed of parties rooted in the Solidarity Movement, has also undergone significant change. While many of its early leaders, including former president Lech Wałęsa, have distanced themselves from current right-wing platforms, modern conservative politics in Poland have increasingly aligned with European and global trends in populism and nationalism. This has resulted in a divide between economically populist but socially conservative groups, such as Law and Justice (Prawo i Sprawiedliwość, PiS), and economically libertarian but equally conservative groups, such as Confederation (Konfederacja). Contemporary debates within the right often center on issues such as the Russian invasion of Ukraine and the presence of Ukrainian immigrants in Poland.

A general public disillusionment with politics and political elites has shaped party branding in recent decades. As a result, most major political organizations avoid the term "party" in their names, preferring alternatives such as "union," "platform," "league," or "alliance," which are considered less directly associated with politics.

== Parliamentary parties ==
Alliance	Logo	Name	Abbr.	Ideology	Position	European affiliation	Representation		
Alliance	Logo	Name	Abbr.	Ideology	Position	European affiliation	Sejm	Senat	MEPs
ZP		Law and Justice; Prawo i Sprawiedliwość	PiS	National conservatism; Paternalistic conservatism; Right-wing populism	Right-wing	ECR	141 / 460	31 / 100	20 / 53
ZP		Renewal of the Republic of Poland; OdNowa RP	ON RP	Moderate conservatism; Pro-Europeanism	Centre-right	—N/a	4 / 460	0 / 100	0 / 53
KO		Civic Coalition; Koalicja Obywatelska	KO	Liberal conservatism; Christian democracy; Pro-Europeanism	Centre-right	EPP	137 / 460	36 / 100	18 / 53
KO		The Greens; Zieloni		Green politics; Liberalism	Centre-left	EGP	2 / 460	0 / 100	0 / 53
KO		Yes! For Poland; Tak! Dla Polski	T!DPL	Regionalism; Localism; Pro-Europeanism	Centre-left	—N/a	2 / 460	1 / 100	0 / 53
KO		AGROunion; AGROunia	AU	Agrarian socialism; Catholic socialism; Economic nationalism	Left-wing	—N/a	1 / 460	0 / 100	0 / 53
Lewica		New Left; Nowa Lewica	NL	Social democracy; Social liberalism; Pro-Europeanism	Centre-left	PES	18 / 460	7 / 100	3 / 53
Lewica		Polish Socialist Party; Polska Partia Socjalistyczna	PPS	Democratic socialism; Progressivism; Pro-Europeanism	Left-wing	—N/a	0 / 460	1 / 100	0 / 53
Lewica		Labour Union; Unia Pracy	UP	Social democracy; Progressivism; Pro-Europeanism	Centre-left	—N/a	0 / 460	1 / 100	0 / 53
KP		Polish People's Party; Polskie Stronnictwo Ludowe	PSL	Conservatism; Christian democracy; Pro-Europeanism	Centre-right to right-wing	EPP	28 / 460	4 / 100	2 / 53
KP		Centre for Poland; Centrum dla Polski	CdP	Conservatism; Christian democracy; Pro-Europeanism	Centre-right	—N/a	3 / 460	0 / 100	0 / 53
KWiN		New Hope; Nowa Nadzieja	NN	Right-wing populism; Conservatism; Hard Euroscepticism	Far-right	ESN	8 / 460	0 / 100	3 / 53
KWiN		National Movement; Ruch Narodowy	RN	National conservatism; Neo-fascism; Hard Euroscepticism	Far-right	Patriots.eu	7 / 460	0 / 100	2 / 53
DB		Kukiz'15	K'15	Right-wing populism; Direct democracy; Soft Euroscepticism	Right-wing	—N/a	3 / 460	0 / 100	0 / 53
DB		Freedom and Prosperity; Wolność i Dobrobyt	WiD	Agrarianism; National conservatism; Soft Euroscepticism	Centre-right	—N/a	1 / 460	0 / 100	0 / 53
		Development Plus; Rozwój Plus	R+	Christian democracy; Conservatism; Pro-Europeanism	Centre-right	ECR	40 / 460	2 / 100	3 / 53
		Poland 2050; Polska 2050	PL2050	Liberal conservatism; Christian democracy; Social conservatism	Centre to centre-right	Renew	32 / 460	5 / 100	1 / 53
		Centre Union; Unia Centrum	Centrum	Liberalism; Neoliberalism; Pro-Europeanism	Centre	Renew	15 / 460	3 / 100	1 / 53
		Together Party; Partia Razem	Razem	Social democracy; Democratic socialism; Pro-Europeanism	Centre-left to left-wing	ELA	5 / 460	0 / 100	0 / 53
		Confederation of the Polish Crown; Konfederacja Korony Polskiej	KKP	Monarchism; Ultranationalism; Hard Euroscepticism	Far-right	Non-Inscrits	3 / 460	0 / 100	1 / 53
		New Poland; Nowa Polska	NOWA	Conservative liberalism; Centrism	Centre	—N/a	0 / 460	3 / 100	0 / 53

== Political parties with local government representation ==
Logo	Name	Abbr.	Leader	Ideology	Position	Extra
	Citizens of Lower Silesia; Obywatelski Dolny Śląsk	ODŚ	Rafał Dutkiewicz	Regionalism; Decentralization; Conservatism	Centre-right	Regional Assemblies
	Citizens of Lower Silesia; Obywatelski Dolny Śląsk	ODŚ	Rafał Dutkiewicz	Regionalism; Decentralization; Conservatism	Centre-right	2 / 552
	Normal Country; Normalny Kraj	NK	Wiesław Lewicki	Right-wing populism; Anti-establishment	Right-wing	Gmina Councils
	Normal Country; Normalny Kraj	NK	Wiesław Lewicki	Right-wing populism; Anti-establishment	Right-wing	1 / 39,416

== Political organizations with representation ==
Logo	Name	Abbr.	Leader	Ideology	Position	Extra	
	The City Is Ours; Miasto Jest Nasze	MJN	Eryk Baczyński	Socialism; Anti-capitalism; Anti-neoliberalism; Environmentalism	Left-wing	Warsaw City Council	Warsaw district councils
	The City Is Ours; Miasto Jest Nasze	MJN	Eryk Baczyński	Socialism; Anti-capitalism; Anti-neoliberalism; Environmentalism	Left-wing	3 / 60	13 / 425
	Residents' Wola; Wola Mieszkańców	WM	Aneta Skubida	Left-wing	Left-wing	Warsaw district councils	
	Residents' Wola; Wola Mieszkańców	WM	Aneta Skubida	Left-wing	Left-wing	2 / 425	
	New Democracy – Yes; Nowa Demokracja – Tak	ND-T	Piotr Chmielowski	Social democracy; Regionalism; Localism; Decentralization	Centre-left	City presidents	
	New Democracy – Yes; Nowa Demokracja – Tak	ND-T	Piotr Chmielowski	Social democracy; Regionalism; Localism; Decentralization	Centre-left	1 / 117	
	Nonpartisan Local Government Activists; Bezpartyjni Samorządowcy	BS	Marek Woch	Localism; Conservatism; Christian democracy; Hard Euroscepticism	Right-wing	Regional Assemblies	
	Nonpartisan Local Government Activists; Bezpartyjni Samorządowcy	BS	Marek Woch	Localism; Conservatism; Christian democracy; Hard Euroscepticism	Right-wing	3 / 552	
	German Minority Electoral Committee; Wahlkomitee Deutsche Minderheit	WDM	Ryszard Galla	German minority interests; Regionalism; Christian democracy; Social market economy	Centre	Opole Voivodeship Sejmik	Powiat Councils in Opole
	German Minority Electoral Committee; Wahlkomitee Deutsche Minderheit	WDM	Ryszard Galla	German minority interests; Regionalism; Christian democracy; Social market economy	Centre	5 / 30	36 / 219

== Parties and organizations without representation ==
Logo	Name	Abbr.	Leader	Ideology	Position	Extra
	Agreement; Porozumienie	P	Stanisław Derehajło	Liberal conservatism	Centre-right	It was founded in November 2017. According to its program, it defines as a pro-European Union party, and as a "modern conservative" party, with strong emphasis on economic liberalism and reducing bureaucracy, and claims to be moderately conservative on social and cultural issues. It believes that local government should be encouraged and supported by the central government.
	Alliance of Democrats; Stronnictwo Demokratyczne	SD	Paweł Piskorski	Social democracy; Christian democracy; Pro-Europeanism	Centre-left	Originated in the Democratic Clubs, which were opposed to authoritarian tendencies in Poland between the two World Wars. The first club was founded in Warsaw in 1937. In the People's Republic of Poland SD became a satellite party of the communist Polish United Workers' Party regime. After 1990, most of the members of the SD joined other parties, such as the Freedom Union. Party continued to exist, but had only a small support base, and was not represented in parliament. Affiliated with EDP.
	Better Poland; Lepsza Polska	LP	Cezary Stachoń	Green politics; Egalitarianism; Solidarism; Degrowth	Left-wing	Small green party related to the degrowth movement which took part in the 2010 Warsaw mayoral election.
	Civic Initiative; Inicjatywa Obywatelska	IO	Adam Morawiec	Silesian localism; Communitarianism; Pro-Europeanism; Environmentalism	Centre-left	Local party from the Tarnowskie Góry County that cooperates with the Civic Platform. The party promotes local interests and advocates for the recognition of Silesian as an official regional language.
	Common Powiat; Wspólny Powiat	WP	Zygmunt Worsa	Silesian localism; Silesian regionalism; Pro-Europeanism; Economic interventionism	Centre-left	Local party from the Świdnica County, mistakenly called Active Local Politicians (Polish: Aktywni Samorządowcy). The party is allied with the Civic Platform and the Democratic Left Alliance. Common Powiat is pro-European and actively promotes extensive development and investment projects.
	All-Polish Youth; Młodzież Wszechpolska	MW	Marcin Osowski	Polish nationalism; Ultranationalism; National Catholicism; Hard Euroscepticism	Far-right	
	Union of Christian Families; Zjednoczenie Chrześcijańskich Rodzin	ZCR	Bogusław Rogalski	Christian democracy; Euroscepticism	Right-wing	Founded in 2019 by former LPR MEP Bogusław Rogalski. It cooperates with Right Wing of the Republic and the Real Europe Movement.
	Congress of the New Right; Kongres Nowej Prawicy	KNP	Stanisław Żółtek	Right-wing populism; Hard Euroscepticism; Economic liberalism	Right-wing	Founded in 2011 by Janusz Korwin-Mikke by the merger of Liberty and Lawfulness with several members of Real Politics Union. The former leader Korwin-Mikke was ousted from the party in 2015, which caused massive decline in its support. Affiliated with the ID Party.
	Democratic Left Association; Stowarzyszenie Lewicy Demokratycznej	SLD	Jerzy Teichert	Social democracy; Pro-Europeanism; Left-wing patriotism; Old Left	Left-wing	
	Edward Gierek's Economic Revival Movement; Ruch Odrodzenia Gospodarczego im. Edwarda Gierka	ROG	Paweł Bożyk	Communism; Socialism; Anti-capitalism; Anti-Atlanticism	Far-left	Refers to the achievements of Edward Gierek's (Secretary of the Central Committee of the Polish United Workers' Party, 1970–1980) rule. It is against Poland's membership in NATO and postulated the withdrawal of troops from Iraq.
	Farmers from the Baltic to the Tatras; Rolnicy od Bałtyku do Tatr	RBT	Henryk Połcik	Peasant movement	Centre-left	
	Falanga	F	Bartosz Bekier	Polish nationalism; Revolutionary nationalism; Eurasianism; Hard Euroscepticism	Far-right	Falanga separated from the ONR in 2009 due to ideological differences, particularly regarding geopolitics. While both movements adhere to fascist principles, their international orientations diverge. The ONR maintains a pro-Western stance, viewing Poland as part of Western civilization. In foreign policy, it presents itself as non-aligned but generally supports Ukraine in the Russo-Ukrainian War, with particular sympathy for the Azov Brigade. Falanga, by contrast, espouses a pro-Eastern outlook, regarding Poland as belonging to a broader Eurasian civilization. It is firmly pro-Russian and advocates for a multipolar world order. The movement had established contacts with the government of Bashar al-Assad in Syria, representatives of the self-proclaimed Donetsk and Lugansk People's Republics, as well as Hezbollah.
	First Self-Governance League; Liga Samorządowa Pierwsza	LSP	Ryszard Ziobro	Decentralisation; Silesian localism; Silesian regionalism; Environmentalism	Centre-left to left-wing	Local party from the Pszczyna County allied with the Polish Socialist Party. The party wants to decentralise Polish administration and greatly empower local governments, and summarised its program by stating: "Silesia – regional and aware of its national and cultural identity. Poland – regional, not centralised".
	Freedom and Equality; Wolność i Równość	WiR	Piotr Musiał	Social democracy; Social conservatism	Centre-right	Founded in 2005 as a Union of the Left, in 2015 its name was changed to Liberty and Equality. It usually takes part in elections as part of coalitions of larger left-wing parties. The party has shifted rightward since the 2023 elections.
	Front	FRONT	Krzysztof Tołwiński	Agrarianism; Russophilia Pro-Lukashenko; Anti-Americanism	Right-wing	
	Jurassic-Silesian Association European Home; Jurajsko-Śląskie Stowarzyszenie Dom Europejski	JŚSDE	Zbigniew Meres	Silesian regionalism; Environmentalism; Pro-Europeanism	Left-wing	
	Kashubian Association; Kaszëbskô Jednota	KJ	Karol Rhode	Regionalism; Kashubian autonomy; Kashubian minority interests	Centre	A regionalist party representing the interests of the Kashubian minority. The party demands Kashubian autonomy as a way to preserve Kashubian culture and language. The party is a member of EFA.
	Labour Party; Stronnictwo Pracy	SP	Zbigniew Wrzesiński	Christian democracy; Political Catholicism	Centre-right	Founded in 1989 on the initiative of the activists of the Christian Democratic Club of Political Thought. In 1990 the name Christian-Democratic Labour Party (ChDSP) was adopted. It referred to the Labour Party operating in the years 1937–1950.
	League of Polish Families; Liga Polskich Rodzin	LPR	Witold Bałażak	Christian conservatism; Social conservatism; Civic nationalism; Anti-capitalism; Familialism; Pro-Europeanism	Centre-right	LPR was created just before parliamentary elections in 2001 as a far-right nationalist party. In 2004 European Parliament elections, LPR received 15.2%, which gave it 10 out of 54 seats, making it the second-largest party in Poland in that election. In 2005 elections, LPR received 8% of votes and formed a government coalition with PiS and SRP. In the 2007 parliamentary election, it failed to gain the 5% of votes and lost all its seats. In the following years, LPR has become more moderate, usually supporting candidates of PO and PSL.
	Liberal Poland – Entrepreneurs' Strike; Polska Liberalna Strajk Przedsiębiorców	PL!SP	Paweł Tanajno	Libertarianism; Economic liberalism; Populism	Centre to centre-right	It was founded on 23 May 2021. It claims to be "a civil formation in which there is not a single politician", advocates for libertarian and economically liberal policies but distinguishes itself from Confederation on women's and migrants' rights.
	National Party of Retirees and Pensioners; Krajowa Partia Emerytów i Rencistów	KPEiR	Tomasz Mamiński	Pensioners' interests; Democratic socialism; Social democracy; Catholic socialism	Left-wing	Founded in 1994. It lost its first parliamentary election in 1997 winning just 2.18% and no seat in Sejm and Senate. In the parliamentary elections in 2015, several activists of KPEiR competed for the Sejm from the lists of the United Left, which did not obtain any seats.
	National Radical Camp; Obóz Narodowo-Radykalny	ONR	Adrian Kaczmarkiewicz	Neo-fascism; Anti-globalization; Hard Euroscepticism; Anti-capitalism	Far-right	The National Radical Camp (ONR) was founded in 1993, presenting itself as the successor to the interwar movement of the same name. This claim, however, has not prevented the emergence of other organizations, such as Falanga and the National Rebirth of Poland (NOP), which also assert continuity with the original ONR of the interwar period. Despite these competing claims, the ONR has remained the largest fascist organization in Poland.
	National Rebirth of Poland; Narodowe Odrodzenie Polski	NOP	Adam Gmurczyk	Ultranationalism; Polish nationalism; National syndicalism; Anti-globalism; Hard Euroscepticism; Anti-Americanism; Anti-capitalism; Anti-Zionism; Third Positionism; Corporatism; Distributism; Radical environmentalism; Anti-communism; Neo-fascism	Far-right	The NOP is known for trying to get media attention with its shock value campaigns. During the 2007 parliamentary election, the NOP distributed election campaign posters with the slogan "Fascism? We are worse." Another, openly homophobic shock value campaign conducted by the NOP was called Zakaz Pedalowania (the phrase is a pun meaning both "Cycling Forbidden" and "Faggotry Forbidden"). On 17 May 2006 in Toruń, the NOP organized a counter-demonstration against a public LGBT rights supporters' meeting. NOP members chanted slogans, including "gas the queers" (pedały do gazu) and "there will be a baton for a queer face" (znajdzie się kij na pedalski ryj).
	New Wave; Nowa Fala	NF	Joanna Senyszyn	Social democracy; Anti-clericalism; Pro-Europeanism	Centre-left to left-wing	
	Union of War Veterans; Związek Weteranów Wojny	ZWW	Mieczysław Janosz	Veterans interests; Polish nationalism; National Democracy	Centre-right	
	Prosperity and Peace Movement; Ruch Dobrobytu i Pokoju	RDiP	Maciej Maciak	Welfare nationalism; Classical liberalism; Euroscepticism	Centre-left	The leader of the Prosperity and Peace Movement, Maciej Maciak, participated in the 2025 presidential elections. During the campaign, he was repeatedly marginalized, being excluded from the debates hosted by Polsat News and TV Republika. Although he was invited to appear on Kanał Zero, the interview ended abruptly when the host, Krzysztof Stanowski, walked out after only two minutes, leaving Maciak without an opportunity to debate. These unusual and chaotic appearances contributed to Maciak becoming the subject of widespread internet jokes and memes, particularly on TikTok and X.
	Peasants' Party; Partia Chłopska	PCh	Krzysztof Filipek	Agrarian socialism; Left-wing nationalism; Left-wing populism; Peasant movement; Catholic left	Left-wing	Founded by Krzysztof Filipek and other former members of Self-Defence.
	PolExit	PolEXIT	Stanisław Żółtek	Hard Euroscepticism; Traditionalist conservatism; Right-libertarianism	Right-wing	Satellite party of KNP, established for the elections to the European Parliament in 2019. It registered lists in 2 constituencies.
	Polish Left; Polska Lewica	PL	Jacek Zdrojewski	Social democracy; Democratic socialism	Left-wing	Formed in 2007 when former Prime Minister Leszek Miller and many other members of parliament withdrew from the Democratic Left Alliance, which Miller had headed for many years. His departure also served as a public protest against the policies of party leaders. In 2010 Miller left the party and decided to return to SLD.
	Polish Pirate Party; Polska Partia Piratów	Piraci	Janusz Wdzięczak	Pirate politics; Freedom of information; Pro-Europeanism	Centre-left	Before European Parliament elections in 2014, P3 concluded an agreement with DB, by virtue of which its activists were included in the lists of the DB committee, which received 0.23% of the votes. In the local elections of the same year, Tomasz Słowiński was nominated by KNP as a candidate in Skierniewice presidential elections, taking the last, 6th place with slightly more than 2% support. Affiliated with PPEU.
	Polish Party of Animal Protection; Polska Partia Ochrony Zwierząt	PPOZ	Andrzej Olszewski	Animal rights; Animal welfare; Environmentalism; Green politics; Social democracy	Left-wing	
	Polish Popular-Christian Forum "Patrimony"; Polskie Forum Ludowo-Chrześcijańskie „Ojcowizna"	PFLCh „Ojcowizna”	Paweł Murzyn	Christian democracy; Christian nationalism; Economic patriotism; Conservatism; Agrarianism	Right-wing	
	Real Europe Movement; Ruch Prawdziwa Europa	RPE	Mirosław Piotrowski	National conservatism; Political Catholicism	Right-wing	Created in 2019 by former PiS MEP Mirosław Piotrowski, who belonged to party's fundamentalist faction.
	Real Politics Union; Unia Polityki Realnej	UPR	Bartosz Józwiak	Ordoliberalism; Federalism; National conservatism; Economic liberalism; Right-wing populism; Soft Euroscepticism	Right-wing	
	Repair Poland Movement; Ruch Naprawy Polski	RNP	Romuald Starosielec	National Democracy; Economic nationalism; Ordoliberalism; Social conservatism; Euroscepticism	Syncretic	
	Right Wing of the Republic; Prawica Rzeczypospolitej	PR	Krzysztof Kawęcki	National conservatism; Social conservatism; Economic liberalism; Euroscepticism; Polish nationalism	Right-wing	Founded by former Marshal of the Sejm Marek Jurek on 20 April 2007 after he had left Law and Justice on 16 April 2007, when the Sejm failed to pass a constitutional amendment protecting prenatal life. It positions itself as a Christian conservative party with a strong focus on family rights and an anti-abortion stance. Affiliated with ECPM.
	Self-Defence of the Republic of Poland; Samoobrona Rzeczpospolitej Polskiej	SRP	Krzysztof Prokopczyk	Agrarian socialism; Catholic socialism; Catholic left; Social conservatism; Anti-neoliberalism; Anti-globalization; Left-wing populism; Left-wing nationalism	Left-wing	SRP became prominent in the 2001 parliamentary election, winning 53 seats, after which it gave confidence and supply to the SLD government. It elected 6 MEPs in 2004 and switched its support to PiS after the 2005 election, in which it won 56 seats and entered the government coalition. In 2007, the party leader was dismissed from his position and the party withdrew from the coalition. This precipitated a new election, at which the party collapsed and lost all of its seats.
	Self-Defence Rebirth; Samoobrona Odrodzenie	SO	Sławomir Izdebski	Agrarian socialism; Catholic socialism; Catholic left; Laborism	Left-wing	Founded in 2007 from the merger of the Self-Defense Social Movement party and several other marginal groups formed by splitters from the Self-Defense of the Republic of Poland.
	Silesian Autonomy Movement; Ruch Autōnōmije Ślōnska	RAŚ	Jerzy Gorzelik	Economic progressivism; Silesian autonomism; Silesian regionalism; Left-wing populism	Left-wing	Silesian autonomist party that seeks to restore the interwar Silesian autonomy. The party is a member of the European Free Alliance and formed an electoral alliance with the Civic Platform.
	Silesian Regional Party; Ślōnskŏ Partyjŏ Regiōnalnŏ	ŚPR	Ilona Kanclerz	Silesian regionalism; Silesian autonomism; Localism; Decentralization; Linguistic separatism; Environmentalism; Economic interventionism; Social welfare; Pro-Europeanism	Centre-left	Party associating regionalists from Silesian local organizations. The most important of them is the Silesian Autonomy Movement. Affiliated with EFA.
	Silesians Together; Ślonzoki Razem	ŚR	Leon Swaczyna	Localism; Silesian autonomism; Silesian regionalism; Decentralization; Federalism; Linguistic separatism; German minority interests	Centre-left	A Silesian regional party founded in 2017, based on the concept of working together with the German minority in Silesia. The party believes that the Silesian nation and culture are completely separate from the Polish nation, and many of the party's members hold separatist views.
	Social Movement of the Republic of Poland; Ruch Społeczny Rzeczypospolitej Polskiej	RS RP	Sławomir Izdebski	Agrarian socialism; Left-wing populism; Trade union movement	Left-wing	
	Slavic Union; Związek Słowiański	ZS	Zbigniew Adamczyk	Economic nationalism; Anti-Americanism; Social patriotism; Agrarianism; Russophilia	Left-wing	Minor party founded in 2006 that wants to reorient Polish foreign policy – it advocates for leaving the EU and pursuing closer relations with Russia and Belarus instead.
	United Beyond Boundaries; Zjednoczeni Ponad Podziałami	ZPP	Wojciech Kornowski	Pensioners' rights; Socialism; Left-wing nationalism; Left-wing populism	Left-wing	Founded in 2018 by former leader of The Confederation of Polish Employers, Wojciech Kornowski. Its main goal is protecting retired seniors, pensioners and trust-busting. Known as Action of Disappointed Retirees and Pensioners until 2022 (Polish: Akcja Zawiedzionych Emerytów Rencistów, AZER).
	Volt Poland; Volt Polska	Volt		European Federalism; Social liberalism; Pro-Europeanism	Centre	
	Working People's Movement; Ruch Ludzi Pracy	RLP	Lech Szymańczyk	Democratic socialism; Labour movement; Catholic left; Left-wing populism	Left-wing	
	Workers' Democracy; Pracownicza Demokracja	PD	Andrzej Żebrowski	Trotskyism; Socialism; Marxism; Internationalism	Far-left	
	Change; Zmiana	Z	Mateusz Piskorski	Socialist patriotism; Left-wing populism; Left-wing nationalism; Anti-capitalism; Anti-Atlanticism; Euroscepticism	Left-wing	Refused registration by court.
	Polish Communist Party	KPP	Beata Karoń	Communism; Marxism–Leninism; Left-conservatism	Far-left	Ban on party ineffective owing to the constitutional crisis in Poland.

== Historical parties ==
=== Important defunct parties after 1989 ===
Party		Leader	Ideology	European affiliation	Founded	Dissolved	Comments
Civic Platform; Platforma Obywatelska	PO	Donald Tusk	Liberal conservatism; Christian democracy; Pro-Europeanism	EPP	2001	2025	A liberal-conservative party that emerged as the dominating party in Poland along with Law and Justice in 2005. In October 2025, it merged with two of its minor partners, the Polish Initiative and Modern, to create a new party named Civic Coalition.
Modern.Nowoczesna	.N	Ryszard Petru	Liberalism; Neoliberalism; Pro-Europeanism	ALDE	2015	2025	A neoliberal party created in 2015 by economist Ryszard Petru. In the 2015 Polish parliamentary election, the party won 7.6% of the popular vote and 28 seats. It later joined the Civic Coalition, and in October 2025, it merged with Civic Platform and Polish Initiative into a new party of the same name – the Civic Coalition.
Polish Initiative; Inicjatywa Polska	iPL	Barbara Nowacka	Social democracy; Social liberalism; Progressivism; Pro-Europeanism	EPP	2019	2025	A minor political party created by Barbara Nowacka, former member of Your Movement and leader of the United Left. In 2025, it merged with Modern and Civic Platform into Civic Coalition.
Piast Faction; Stronnictwo Piast	SP	Zdzisław Podkański	Agrarianism; Social conservatism; Christian democracy; Economic progressivism		2006	2024	Formed as a result of the break-up in PSL and the departure of the right wing of the party. Its name refers both to the Polish medieval Piast dynasty and to the pre-war conservative party PSL Piast.
Solidarity Citizens' Committee; Komitet Obywatelski "Solidarność"	KO "S"	Bronisław Geremek	Big tent; Anti-communism; Liberal democracy		1989	1991	Initially a semi-legal political organisation of the democratic opposition in Communist Poland. In the partially-free 1989 election KO "S" won all 161 seats available in the Sejm, and 99 out of 100 seats in the senate. On 25 August 1989, the new "Contract Sejm" elected its candidate Tadeusz Mazowiecki as Prime Minister, making him the first ever non-Communist head of government east of the Iron Curtain. Shortly afterwards, the Committee broke up into several smaller parties.
Christian National Union; Zjednoczenie Chrześcijańsko-Narodowe	ZChN	Wiesław Chrzanowski	National Catholicism; National conservatism; Christian democracy		1989	2010	Party formed by Catholic politicians of KO "S". In 1991 election it took 3rd place, winning 8.74% and introducing 49 MPs. ZChN was a member of two government coalitions. In 1993 the party did not cross electoral threshold and in 1997 it became member of AWS. In 2001 most of ZChN activists joined LPR or PiS. Party lost its former significance.
Social Democracy of the Republic of Poland; Socjaldemokracja Rzeczypospolitej Polskiej	SdRP	Aleksander Kwaśniewski	Social democracy; Progressivism	SI	1990	1999	Party was formed after the dissolution of communist PZPR. In 1991 it created the left-wing SLD coalition. In the election held this year it won 11.99% of the votes, taking second place. Two years later SLD won election and in 1995 Aleksander Kwaśniewski became president. In 1997 the party lost power. In 1999 SdRP co-founded a unified party SLD and dissolved itself.
Party of Regions; Partia Regionów	PR	Bolesław Borysiuk	Agrarianism; Socialism; Regionalism		2007	2017	Party that seceded from Self-Defence of the Republic of Poland following its electoral down in the 2007 elections. The party strongly supported regionalism, intending to revive local and regional traditions and patriotism. The party envisioned a decentralised Poland full of "regional, small homelands". PR cooperated with left-wing parties such as the Democratic Left Alliance and the Polish Socialist Party. The party won 38 councillor seats in the 2010 Polish local elections, but never entered the national Sejm. The party was deregistered in early 2017.
Centre Agreement; Porozumienie Centrum	PC	Jarosław Kaczyński	Anti-communism; Centrism; Christian democracy	EDU	1990	2001	Party founded in 1990, demanded a break with previous policy of the government of Tadeusz Mazowiecki, who was accused of leaving the remains of communism too slowly. PC candidate Lech Wałęsa won the presidential election, but later on he got into conflict with the party. In 1991, PC received 8.71% of the votes, introducing 44 MPs, but in 1993 only 4.42% (below the electoral threshold). In 1997 party started from AWS and ROP lists, introducing 15 MPs. In 2001 PC was transformed into the currently ruling PiS.
Citizens' Movement for Democratic Action; Ruch Obywatelski Akcja Demokratyczna	ROAD	Władysław Frasyniuk	Market socialism; Social conservatism		1990	1991	Party was founded in response to creation of PC by Jarosław Kaczyński. In 1990 presidential election it supported candidacy of Tadeusz Mazowiecki, who took 3rd place. In 1991, ROAD merged with FPD and established the UD.
Organisation of the Polish Nation – Polish League; Organizacja Narodu Polskiego – Liga Polska	ONP-LP	Stanisław Bujnicki	National Democracy; Political Catholicism; Protectionism; Economic nationalism; Polish diaspora interests		2000	2025	Party that represented the interests of the Polish diaspora. It claimed to be a successor of the liberal democratic Polish émigré organisation Liga Polska (1887–1893), founded in Switzerland by Zygmunt Miłkowski following the failure of the January uprising.
Forum of the Democratic Right; Forum Prawicy Democratycznej	FPD	Aleksander Hall	Conservative liberalism; Liberal conservatism; Christian democracy		1990	1991	Party formed by moderate right-wing politicians of KO "S". In 1991 it merged with ROAD to form UD.
Polish Social Democratic Union; Polska Unia Socjaldemokratyczna	PUS	Tadeusz Fiszbach	Social democracy; Social patriotism; Welfare state		1990	1991	Along with SdRP, PUS was one of successor parties of communist PZPR. The party itself was succeeded by currently existing UP.
Liberal Democratic Congress; Kongres Liberalno-Demokratyczny	KLD	Donald Tusk	Economic liberalism; Neoliberalism; Conservative liberalism	EDU	1990	1994	Party originated from Gdańsk Social-Economic Society "Congress of Liberals". In 1991 elections KLD won 7.49% of votes and 37 seats in the Sejm. In 1993 it did not reach electoral threshold and a year later merged with UD to form UW.
Polish Beer-Lovers' Party; Polska Partia Przyjaciół Piwa	PPPP	Janusz Rewiński	Political satire		1990	1993	Party founded by popular satirists. Originally, its goal was to promote cultural beer-drinking in English-style pubs instead of vodka and thus fight alcoholism. In 1991 election PPPP won 16 seats in the Sejm capturing 2.97% of the vote. Party soon split into Large Beer and Small Beer factions. Eventually PPPP was dissolved in 1993.
Party X Partia X	X	Stanisław Tymiński	Populism; Anti-establishment; Syncretic politics		1990	1999	Party was established by businessman Stanisław Tymiński who took 2nd place in 1990 presidential election. In 1991 parliamentary elections it received 0.47% of the vote, winning three seats in the Sejm. Despite increasing its vote share in the 1993 election to 2.74%, it failed to win a seat, following introduction of a 5% electoral threshold. Party failed to collect enough signatures for Tymiński to run in the 1995 presidential elections.
Democratic Union; Unia Demokratyczna	UD	Tadeusz Mazowiecki	Liberalism; Social liberalism; Christian democracy		1991	1994	Party was founded by Prime Minister Tadeusz Mazowiecki as a merger of ROAD and FPD. It won election this year with 12.32% of the vote and 62 MPs. A year later conservative faction left party. In 1993 election UD took 3rd place (10.59% of votes and 74 MPs) and a year later merged with KLD to form UW.
Peasants' Agreement; Porozumienie Ludowe	PL	Gabriel Janowski	Agrarianism; Conservatism; Christian democracy		1991	1999	In 1991 parliamentary election party received 5.5% of the vote, winning 28 seats in the Sejm. It joined the coalition governments headed by Jan Olszewski and Hanna Suchocka. Due to several splits and internal disagreements, 1993 elections saw the party's vote share fall to 2.4%. As it had failed to pass the 5% electoral threshold, it lost all its parliamentary representation. In 1997 PL joined AWS.
Movement for the Republic; Ruch dla Rzeczypospolitej	RdR	Jan Olszewski	Anti-communism; National conservatism; Paternalistic conservatism		1992	1999	Party founded by overthrown former Prime Minister Jan Olszewski and a group of radically anti-communist MPs who demanded full lustration. In 1993 elections, RdR obtained 2.7% of the votes and did not cross electoral threshold. Two years later Olszewski took 4th place in presidential election. In 1995, the most important RdR politicians founded ROP, while the rest of party joined AWS.
Social Alliance; Przymierze Społeczne	PS	Marek Pol; Jarosław Kalinowski; Andrzej Lepper	Anti-austerity; Anti-neoliberalism; Agrarian socialism; Social democracy		1998	2001	Political coalition composed of agrarian and left-wing parties – Polish People's Party, Labour Union, National Party of Retirees and Pensioners, Samoobrona RP and Alliance of Democrats created for the 1998 Polish local elections. It presented itself as 'independent left' that aspired to break the anti-communist and post-communist dichotomy in Polish politics, while also protesting neoliberal and capitalist reforms carried out through Balcerowicz Plan. While short-lived, the coalition successfully emerged as the "third power" in the 1998 election and is credited with breaking the SLD-AWD two-party duopoly.
Patriotic Self-Defence; Samoobrona Patriotyczna	SP	Marian Frądczyk	National agrarianism; Economic nationalism; Social Catholicism		2006	2013	Political party that broke away from Self-Defence of the Republic of Poland in 2006. The party represented marginalized right-wing and nationalist wings of the party that were alienated as Self-Defence reaffirmed its far-left political position. The party tried to claim a part of Self-Defence electorate in 2007 election, but it was only registered in a single district and won 0.02% of the national vote. It disbanded in 2013.
Self-Defence of the Polish Nation; Samoobrona Narodu Polskiego	SNP	Tadeusz Mazanek	National agrarianism; National Catholicism; Anti-capitalism		2003	2023	Right-wing nationalist party that was founded as a dissident faction of Self-Defence of the Republic of Poland in 2003, before registering as a separate party in 2005. The party marked the beginning of further splinters within Samoobrona that were to follow. It was struck off the ballot in 2006 for being too similar to the original Samoobrona party, and renamed itself to "Defence of the Polish Nation" in response. It continued to participate in Polish elections as a perennial candidate until 2018. It became inactive in 2019 and dissolved in 2023.
Self-Defence Social Movement; Samoobrona Ruch Społeczny	SRS	Sławomir Izdebski	Agrarian socialism; Laborism; Left-wing nationalism		2006	2007	Agrarian and trade-unionist wing of Self-Defence of the Republic of Poland that split from the party in 2006 and became an independent movement. Social Movement actively organized rural trade unions and was known for its social justice actions such as blocking evictions. It tried to challenge Self-Defence in 2006 local elections, but it was not allowed on the count of its name, logo and abbreviation being too similar to Self-Defence. It disbanded to join Self-Defence Rebirth in 2007.
Nonpartisan Bloc for Support of Reforms; Bezpartyjny Blok Wspierania Reform	BBWR	Andrzej Olechowski	Christian democracy; Populism; Pro-Wałęsa politics		1993	1997	Party affiliated with President Lech Wałęsa. It was founded to continue the traditions of Józef Piłsudski's pre-war Nonpartisan Bloc for Cooperation with the Government (Bezpartyjny Blok Współpracy z Rządem), which likewise had been known by the same initials, BBWR. In 1997 became part of AWS.
Freedom Union; Unia Wolności	UW	Bronisław Geremek	Liberalism; Social liberalism; Economic liberalism	ALDE	1994	2005	Party was founded out of merger of UD and KLD. In 1997 election UW got 13.37% of the votes and 60 seats. It joined government coalition with AWS. In 2001 some members of UW decided to create new party PO, which got 12.68% of the votes and 65 seats in general elections whilst UW failed to cross the 5% threshold required to gain entry to the lower house of Parliament, receiving only 3.10%. Surprisingly, party managed to cross the required 5% threshold in 2004 European Parliament election, receiving 7.33% of votes and 4 seats. In 2005 UW was transformed into PD.
Movement for the Reconstruction of Poland; Ruch Odbudowy Polski	ROP	Jan Olszewski	National conservatism; Paternalistic conservatism; Social conservatism		1995	2012	Party was established after 1995 presidential election, which ended with an unexpectedly good result for Jan Olszewski (4th place, 6.86% of votes). Despite formation of AWS, which integrated almost all centre-right and right-wing parties, ROP, encouraged by the high support in polls, decided to stay outside the federation. Eventually, in 1997 election party received 5.56% of support and introduced only 6 MPs (including Jarosław Kaczyński – Chairman of PC, whose other members ran from AWS lists). In 2001 party participated in election on LPR lists and in following years lost its significance.
Solidarity Electoral Action; Akcja Wyborcza Solidarność	AWS	Marian Krzaklewski	Solidarism; Christian democracy; Social conservatism		1996	2001	Formation of party was connected with integration of post-Solidarity parties into a broad electoral block. AWS won 1997 parliamentary election gaining 33.83% of votes and 201 seats. It formed a coalition with UW, which collapsed in 2000. Chairman Marian Krzaklewski became AWS candidate in 2000 presidential election. His candidacy did not arouse general consensus – some activists were largely in favour of independent Andrzej Olechowski. Krzaklewski won 15.57% of votes, finishing third. In 2001 liberal wing left AWS and joined new party PO, created by a part of former UW politicians. Trade union NSZZ "Solidarity" decided not to participate in political structures anymore. Activists associated with the Kaczyński brothers created another new party – PiS. Christian-national wing joined LPR. As a result of parliamentary election in 2001, AWS failed to cross the 8% threshold required to gain entry to the Sejm as coalition, receiving only 5.60% of votes. Shortly afterwards, federation ceased to exist.
Spring; Wiosna	Wiosna	Robert Biedroń	Social liberalism; Social democracy	S&D	2019	2021	Registered a political party in 2018, proclaimed in 2019. Formed by Robert Biedroń, former Słupsk mayor. Won 3 seats in European Parliament election in 2019. Formed The Left electoral alliance at the 2019 election. Merged into New Left party in 2021. Remains a faction within the NL.
Democratic Left Alliance; Sojusz Lewicy Demokratycznej	SLD	Aleksander Kwaśniewski (founder), Leszek Miller (first), Włodzimierz Czarzasty (last)	Social democracy	S&D	1999	2021	Founded as an electoral alliance around SdRP at the 1991 election by Aleksander Kwaśniewski. Formed a coalition government together with PSL after 1993 election. Registered a political party in 1999 under leadership of Leszek Miller. After 2001 election formed SLD-UP coalition government. Under leadership of Włodzimierz Czarzasty formed The Left electoral alliance together with Spring and Left Together at the 2019 election. In 2021 absorbed the Spring party and later rebranded as New Left. Remains a faction within the NL.
Conservative People's Party; Stronnictwo Konserwatywno-Ludowe	SKL	Jan Rokita	Liberal conservatism; Christian democracy; Agrarianism		1997	2014	Creation of party was result of merger of several small, moderately conservative parties. It was also joined by some former UW MPs. It quickly joined AWS. In 2001 party participated in elections by running from PO lists. The most important politicians (including future President Bronisław Komorowski) joined PO and SKL became marginal. In 2014 party joined Agreement.
National-Catholic Movement; Ruch Katolicko-Narodowy	RKN	Małgorzata Romanowicz	National Catholicism; National conservatism; Political Catholicism		1997	2023	Created in 1997 by politician Antoni Macierewicz. He left it in 2012.
Polish Labour Party; Polska Partia Pracy	PPP	Bogusław Ziętek	Marxism; Trotskyism; Anti-capitalism	EACL	2001	2017	Small party of the extreme left. Despite lack of electoral successes, it managed to run in elections many times and gain recognition.
Feminist Initiative; Inicjatywa Feministyczna	IF	Iwona Piątek; Elżbieta Jachlewska; Katarzyna Kądziela	Feminism; Women's rights; Social progressivism		2007	2020	Party was registered in 2007 and was known as "Women's Party" (Partia Kobiet) until 2016. On 21 October 2007 National Assembly election, it won 0.28% of the popular vote and no seats in the Sejm or the Senate.
Democratic Party – democrats.pl Partia Demokratyczna – demokraci.pl	PD	Władysław Frasyniuk	Liberalism; Social liberalism; Progressivism	ALDE	2005	2016	Party was supposed to become an extension of UW by politicians coming from the left, social democratic Prime Minister Marek Belka was one of its founders. Some notable politicians did not join the new party. In 2005 parliamentary election PD did not reach the electoral threshold, obtaining the result of 2.45% of votes. In the following years, party unsuccessfully joined several centre-left electoral coalitions. In 2016 PD was renamed to UED. 4 MPs of PO joined new party.
There is One Poland; Polska Jest Jedna	PJJ	Rafał Piech	Traditional Catholicism; Hard Euroscepticism		2021	2024	Right-wing party born out of the anti-COVID-19 restriction movement, founded in 2021 and registered in 2023. It was deregistered in 2024.
Poland Comes First; Polska Jest Najważniejsza	PJN	Paweł Kowal	Conservative liberalism; Liberal conservatism; Christian democracy	ACRE	2010	2013	Party was founded by liberal wing of PiS, which did not agree with its economic policy. In 2011 parliamentary election PJN received 2.19% of the votes, which did not allow it to obtain seats in the Sejm. In 2013 party joined Agreement.
Your Movement; Twój Ruch	TR	Janusz Palikot	Progressivism; Social liberalism; Anti-clericalism		2011	2023	Founded by Janusz Palikot, a former Civic Platform MP, in 2010, as Palikot's Movement. It adopted its current name in 2013. In 2011 parliamentary election, party received 10% of the vote and won 40 seats in the Sejm, making it the third party behind Civic Platform and Law and Justice, one of the best debut performances for a party since the end of communism. In 2015 parliamentary election United Left list was led by Your Movement's Barbara Nowacka and received only 7.6% of the vote, below the 8% threshold, leaving TR without parliamentary representation.
Now! Teraz!	Teraz!	Ryszard Petru	Liberalism; Economic liberalism; Pro-Europeanism	ALDE	2018	2019	Party founded by Ryszard Petru after leaving .Nowoczesna party. Turned out to be ephemeral and quickly dissolved.
Free and Solidary; Wolni i Solidarni	WiS	Kornel Morawiecki	Solidarism; State interventionism; Anti-communism		2016	2020	Party formed by Kornel Morawiecki, former Senior Marshal of the Sejm. MPs of the party were elected from the lists of Kukiz'15. Formerly declared support for Prime Minister Beata Szydło and her government, but later moved into opposition to the government of Mateusz Morawiecki. WiS lost all seats in 2019.
Party of Drivers; Partia Kierowców	PK	Lech Kędzierski	Drivers' rights Anti-bureaucratism		2019	2022	Created in 2019 and dissolved in 2022. Member of Confederation.
Social Justice Movement; Ruch Sprawiedliwości Społecznej	RSS	Piotr Ikonowicz	Socialism; Anti-capitalism; Communism		2014	2023	Founded in 2014 by social activist Piotr Ikonowicz based on his Social Justice Chancellery. Before the presidential elections in 2015, RSS supported candidate of The Greens Anna Grodzka, who did not collect the required number of signatures.
Direct Democracy; Demokracja Bezpośrednia	DB	Marzena Petykiewicz	Direct democracy; E-democracy; Progressivism; Populism		2012	2022	DB's creation was inspired by the 2012 protests against ACTA. In the elections to the European Parliament in 2014, DB set up its own committee, which received 0.23% of the votes. In the 2015 presidential election, DB's candidate was Paweł Tanajno, who took the last place with 0.2% of votes. In the parliamentary elections in 2015, five DB activists (including Tanajno) entered the Sejm from lists of the Kukiz'15. None of them received a mandate. Dissolved in 2022.
Christian Democracy of the 3rd Polish Republic; Chrześcijańska Demokracja III Rzeczypospolitej Polskiej	ChDRP	Lech Wałęsa	Christian democracy; Social conservatism; Social market economy		1997	2023	Founded in 1997 by former president Lech Wałęsa. It took the German CDU as a role model. In 2000 Wałęsa ran in the presidential election, receiving 1.01% of votes (he took 7th place out of 12 candidates). After being de-registered in 2004, the party resumed its activity in 2015 but never gained sufficient traction and it was de-registered again in 2023.
Confederation of Independent Poland; Konfederacja Polski Niepodległej	KPN	Władysław Borowiec	Polish nationalism; Sanationism; Anti-communism; Syncretic politics		1979	2018	Founded in 1979 by Leszek Moczulski and others declaring support for the pre-war traditions of Sanacja and Józef Piłsudski. It was the first independent political party that was publicly proclaimed in the Eastern Bloc. After the fall of communism, Leszek Moczulski got only 2.5% of votes in 1990 presidential election. In 1991 parliamentary election the party got 7.5% of the vote, while in the 1993 parliamentary election it received 5.7%. It was de-registered on 12 January 2018.
Defence of the Polish Nation; Obrona Narodu Polskiego	ONP	Tadeusz Mazanek	Agrarianism; National conservatism; National Catholicism		2003	2023	Originally registered in 2005 as a Self-Defence of the Polish Nation (it operated under this name for a year). It was founded by nationalist splitters from Self-Defence of the Republic of Poland. The party did not participate in any elections after 2019 and stopped submitting financial reports to Polish courts aftwerwards. The party was then formally deregistered and dissolved in February 2023.
National League; Liga Narodowa	LN	Zbigniew Lipiński	National Democracy; National conservatism; Souverainism		2007	2021	Originally registered in 2007 as a National People's Movement (and operated under this name until 2013). It was founded mainly by former activists of League of Polish Families and Self-Defence. As RLN it had agrarian-nationalist character, while as LN it refers only to national democracy. The party was deregistered in 2023 for failing to submit financial statements for 2021.
Silesian Separatist Movement; Śląski Ruch Separatystyczny	ŚRS	Dariusz Jerczyński	Silesian separatism Social democracy		2007	2010	A minor party founded in 2007 whose main goal is "national and territorial separation of Silesia and the sanctioning of Silesian nationality". The party claims to continue the legacy of Silesian autonomist Józef Kożdoń, who in 1910 wrote: "We do not know Polish patriotism, we do not know the Polish homeland. Silesia does not long for mother Poland".

=== Defunct parties of People's Republic of Poland ===
Party		Leader	Ideology	European affiliation	Founded	Dissolved	Comments
Polish United Workers' Party; Polska Zjednoczona Partia Robotnicza	PZPR	Bolesław Bierut (first)	Communism; Marxism-Leninism	Cominform	1948	1990	PZPR was established at unification congress of PPR and PPS during meetings in 1948. Unification was possible because PPS activists who opposed it had been forced out of party. PZPR ruled Poland in the years until 1989. During semi-free election this year communists won 65% of seats in the Sejm, though seats won were guaranteed and PZPR was unable to gain a majority, while 99 out of 100 seats in Senate freely contested were won by Solidarity-backed candidates. Jaruzelski won presidential ballot by one vote. In 1990 PZPR was renamed to SdRP.
United People's Party; Zjednoczone Stronnictwo Ludowe	ZSL	Władysław Kowalski (first)	Agrarian socialism Peasant movement		1949	1989	Party was formed from the merger of communist SL with remnants of the independent PSL of Stanisław Mikołajczyk. ZSL became – as intended from its beginning – a satellite party of PZPR, representing it in rural areas. In 1989 after victory of Solidarity in legislative elections together with PZPR's other satellite party, SD, ZSL decided to support opposition. At party congress ZSL merged with anti-communist PSL in exile, forming today's PSL. SD exists until now.

=== Defunct and historical political parties in the Second Polish Republic, 1918–1939 ===
Party		Last known leader	Ideology	Founded	Dissolved	Comments
Catholic Peoples Party; Stronnictwo Katolicko-Ludowe	SKL	Unknown	Political catholicism; Christian democracy	1918	1937	The party contested the January 1919 elections to elect the first Sejm of the Second Polish Republic. It received 1.8% of the vote, winning 18 seats. It contested the 1922 elections as part of the Polish Centre alliance.
Center-left; Centrolew		Wincenty Witos	Centre-left	1929	1931	prior to the 1930 elections, Centrolew politicians were subjected to repressions (most famously, imprisonment in the Brest Fortress, and the subsequent Brest trials). The Centrolew was defeated in the elections and broke up as a coalition.
Communist Party of Poland; Komunistyczna Partia Polski	KPP	Maksymilian Horwitz	Communism; Marxism–Leninism	1918	1938	Arriving from the Soviet Union, a group of Polish communists was parachuted into occupied Poland in December 1941. With Stalin's permission, in January 1942 they established the Polish Workers' Party, a new communist party.
Communist Party of Western Ukraine; Комуністична партія Західної України	KPZU	Unknown	Communism	1923	1938	most of the Central Committee of the CPWU supported the "nationalist" faction of Alexander Shumsky in the CPU(B). Consequently, Kaganovich, who was the general secretary of the CPU(B), accused the Western Ukrainian communists of treason. The CPWU split into a majority "nationalist" faction and a pro-Kaganovich minority. On 18 February 1928, the majority-CPWU led by Ivan Krilyk and Roman Turyansky was expelled from the Comintern. By the end of 1928, the CPWU (majority) disbanded itself, and its leaders who expressed regrets because of their "errors" went to the USSR, where they were later repressed. The pro-Soviet minority continued as CPWU.
Communist Party of Western Belorussia; Камуністычная партыя Заходняй Беларусі	KPZB	Vera Kharuzhaya	Unification of Western Belorussia with the Byelorussian SSR	1923	1938	Following the Soviet invasion of Poland and the annexation of Western Belarus to the Soviet Union in 1939, many former members of the KPZB joined the Communist Party of Byelorussia, the East Belarusian branch of the Communist Party of the Soviet Union following the dissolution of the party.
Communist Party of Silesian Land; Komunistyczna Partia Ziemi Śląskiej	KPZŚ	Unknown	Communism	1920	1920	In November 1920, it joined with the Silesian Voivodeship branches of the Communist Party of Germany and the Independent Social Democratic Party of Germany, forming the Communist Party of Upper Silesia.
Democratic Clubs; Kluby Demokratyczne	KD	Alfred Fiderkiewicz	Anti-fascism	1937	1939	The façade of a tenement building at 31 Old Town Market Place in Warsaw, features a plaque commemorating the formation of the Warsaw Democratic Club in 1937.
Front Morges	FM	Władysław Sikorski	Anti-Sanation; Pro-France; Democratisation	1936	1937	The Front Morges gained little publicity or support in Poland, but in 1937 led to the formation of a new political party there, the Labor Party (Stronnictwo Pracy), which would become part of the political basis for the Polish Government-in-Exile during 1939–1945.
General Jewish Labour Bund in Poland אַלגעמײַנער ײדישער אַרבעטער בּונד אין פוילן	OZŻR	Michal Shuldenfrei	Bundism; Socialism; Jewish Autonomism; Anti-Zionism	1917	1948	In 1948, around 400 Bund members left Poland. The Bund was dissolved, along with all other non-communist parties, in 1948 following the consolidation of single-party rule by the Polish United Workers' Party. Schuldenfrei was then ousted from the Communist-led Parliament.
Labour Party; Partia Pracy	PP	Unknown	Social democracy	1925	1930	In 1926, the party supported Józef Piłsudski during the May Coup. In 1928 it became part of "Nonpartisan Bloc for Cooperation with the Government" (BBWR).
Labour Faction; Stronnictwo Pracy	SP	Tadeusz Michejda	Political Catholicism; Christian democracy	1937	1950	The party was taken over by a pro-communist faction in 1946, with the rise of the People's Republic of Poland. As a satellite party it participated in 1947 election, and continued to exist until 1950 when it merged into the Democratic Party (Stronnictwo Demokratyczne), an officially sanctioned party in communist Poland, also described as a "satellite" of the communist Polish United Workers' Party (PZPR).
Christian Union of National Unity; Chrześcijański Związek Jedności Narodowej	ChZJN	electoral coalition	Christian democracy	1922	1926	Chjena gained many seats in the 1922 elections (163 parliament seats (out of 444) and 48 Senate seats (out of 111)), but it was not enough for a majority in the parliament (Sejm). After Lanckorona Pact it had become a part of the Chjeno-Piast government.
Camp of Great Poland; Obóz Wielkiej Polski	OWP	Roman Dmowski	Corporativism; Authoritarianism; National Catholicism; Polish nationalism	1926	1933	Outbreaks of the anti-Jewish violence in Eastern Galicia in 1927 led the organization to be banned in that region that year. After a further wave of nationwide violence in 1933, OWP was eventually banned nationally. The government, alarmed by rapid growth of OWP, banned the organization together with its youth movement on 28 March 1933. on the grounds that these organizations threatened stability of the state. After dissolution of the organization, even more radical young members of OWP formed the National Radical Camp (Polish: Obóz Narodowo Radykalny, ONR). ONR would be banned soon after its establishment, in 1934.
Popular National Union; Związek Ludowo-Narodowy	ZLN	Stanisław Kozicki	Republicanism; Polish nationalism; National Democracy; National conservatism	1919	1928	On 17 May 1923, the Lanckorona Pact saw representatives of the ZLN, the Christian-National Labour Party (Chrześcijańsko-Narodowe Stronnictwo Pracy), and PSL "Piast" agreeing to a broad set of philosophical and operational principals, including Polish social policy towards the Eastern (and therefore minority-heavy) borderlands, the assignment of governmental portfolios exclusively to Poles, and joint policies against the political left. The effect of this agreement was the so-called Chjeno-Piast government created on 28 May 1923. It was headed by Witos on the ZLN's behalf. This ministry also included Stanisław Głąbiński, Marian Seyda and Wojciech Korfanty.
National Party; Stronnictwo Narodowe	SN	Mieczysław Trajdos	Polish nationalism; Conservatism; Christian nationalism; Parliamentarism; Anti-communism; Antisemitism; Catholic social teaching; Distributism; Anti-Masonry	1928	1947	On August 20, 1939, Tadeusz Bielecki received an emergency call up to the army and was sent to a unit in Ciechanów. It was probably also to keep the leader of the formation, which had been consistently paying attention to the German threat for several decades, unlike the Piłsudskiites, away from political settlements at the decisive moment. Through Władysław Jaworski, Bielecki only managed to hand over acting chairman duties to Mieczysław Trajdos.
National Radical Camp; Obóz Narodowo-Radykalny	ONR	Bolesław Piasecki	National radicalism	1934	1934 (de jure); 1947 (de facto)	From 1942 to 1944, members of the Executive Committee of OP, as representatives of ONR, were members of the Presidium of the Provisional National Political Council – political body superior to the NSZ. After the agreement to merge the NSZ with the Home Army (AK) was concluded in March 1944, the NSZ split. In April 1944, the nationalists from the ONR resumed their independent activities under the name NSZ-ONR. The most important formation of the NSZ-ONR was the Holy Cross Mountains Brigade established in August 1944 under the command of Captain Antoni Szacki, which was the only Polish military unit during World War II that openly collaborated with Nazi Germany. 1945–47 OP broken up by arrests, ceased activities.
National People's Union; Narodowe Zjednoczenie Ludowe	NZL	Leopold Skulski	Agrarianism; Moderate conservatism	1919	1923	In August 1923 it merged into one of the peasant parties.
National Workers' Party; Narodowa Partia Robotnicza	NPR	Unknown	Solidarism; Corporatism	1920	1937	The party boycotted the 1935 elections; in 1937, it merged with the Polish Christian Democratic Party to form the Labor Party.
Peasant Party; Stronnictwo Chłopskie	SCh	Unknown	Agrarianism; Agrarian socialism; Left-wing populism; Anti-clericalism	1926	1931	In 1928, it joined the Centrolew coalition. In 1931, it merged back with PSL Wyzwolenie and Polish People's Party "Piast", forming the People's Party (SL).
People's Party; Stronnictwo Ludowe	SL	Wincenty Witos	Populism; Agrarianism	1931	1945	After Mikołajczyk's defeat in the rigged 1947 Polish legislative election, the remains of the Polish People's Party were merged (in 1949) into the communist-allied United People's Party (ZSL).
Polish Centre; Polskie Centrum	PC	Skulski(?)	Centre	1922	Unknown	
Polish-Catholic People's Party; Polsko-Katolicka Partia Ludowa	PKPL	Wiktor Kulerski	Agrarianism; Anti-communism	1912	1918	After the war, PKPL in Poland united with Polish People's Party "Piast". However, its remnants continued operating in regions with a Polish minority within the Weimar Republic.
Polish Catholic Bloc; Polski Blok Katolicki	PBK	Józef Chaciński	Christian democracy; Agrarianism; Parliamentarism; Republicanism	1928	1928	The Bloc was founded in 1928 to contest that year's parliamentary election by the Polish People's Party "Piast" and Polish Christian Democratic Party. It organized election gatherings before election day, like a Housekeepers' gathering on 26 February. In the 1928 election, it received 34 Sejm and 6 Senat seats.
Polish Christian Democratic Party; Polskie Stronnictwo Chrześcijańskiej Demokracji	PSChD	Unknown	Political Catholicism; Christian democracy	1919	1937	After the May Coup of 1926, split into three factions. Member of Centrolew coalition in 1929. Member of Front Morges coalition in 1937, and merged with National Workers' Party to form the Labor Party.
Polish People's Party "Piast"; Polskie Stronnictwo Ludowe "Piast"	PSL Piast	Wincenty Witos	Agrarianism; Christian democracy	1914	1931	it formed a part of several governments, most notably after the Lanckorona Pact and in the Chjeno-Piast coalition. In 1931 it formed the People's Party. Its major politicians included Wincenty Witos, Jakub Bojko, Jan Dąbski, Maciej Rataj and Władysław Kiernik.
Polish People's Party "Nowe Wyzwolenie"; Polskie Stronnictwo Ludowe "Nowe Wyzwolenie"	PSL NW	Tadeusz Rek; Bronisław Drzewiecki	Agrarianism; Agrarian socialism; Secularism	1946	1947	The parliamentary candidates from the Stronnictwo Ludowe "Nowe Wyzwolenie" included Bronisław Drzewiecki, Bronisław Kloc, Władysław Kosydarski, Witold Oleszczak, Michał Rękas, Władysław Ryncarz, and Jan Witoszka. Following the elections, the party merged with the People's Party (Stronnictwo Ludowe) in Lublin. The two leaders were Tadeusz Rek and Bronisław Drzewiecki.
Polish People's Party "Wyzwolenie"; Polskie Stronnictwo Ludowe "Wyzwolenie"	PSL Wyzwolenie	Maksymilian Malinowski	Agrarianism; Agrarian socialism; Secularism	1915	1931	It was formed in 1915 by several peasant parties in Kingdom of Poland. In comparison to Polish People's Party "Piast", it was a left-wing party, and an ally of Polish Socialist Party (Polska Partia Socjalistyczna). PSL Wyzwolenie supported the May Coup in 1926, but soon afterwards distanced itself from Sanation and joined the opposition. In 1931, it merged with several other parties forming the People's Party (Stronnictwo Ludowe).
Polish Socialist Party; Polska Partia Socjalistyczna	PPS	Józef Cyrankiewicz	Socialism	1892	1948	In 1948, Cyrankiewicz's faction of Socialists merged with the Communist Polish Workers' Party (PPR) to form the Polish United Workers' Party (Polska Zjednoczona Partia Robotnicza; PZPR), the ruling party in the Polish People's Republic; remnants of the other faction survived on emigration in the Polish government-in-exile and because of that Polish Socialist Party was still active on emigration.
Polish Socialists; Polscy Socjaliści	PS	Vincent Markowski	Socialism; Polish resistance; Anti-fascism	1941	1943	By 1943 PPS-WRN had changed tactics and its leadership initiated attempts to unify with PS, resulting in the break-away of the latter's military wing to align with the PPS-WRN and Home Army. In April of that year the party was transformed into the Robotnicza Partia Polskich Socjalistów, with Piotr Gajewski as its new leader.
Polish Socialist Party – Freedom, Equality, Independence; Ruch Mas Pracujących Miast i Wsi – Wolność, Równość, Niepodległość	WRN	Tomasz Arciszewski	Socialism; National independence	1939	1947	At the end of World War II, the name PPS was contested by PPS-WRN and the pro-communist Workers Polish Socialist Party (Robotnicza Partia Polskich Socjalistów). Eventually in 1947, most top PPS-WRN activists were arrested by Polish secret police, Urząd Bezpieczeństwa; the remains ceased political activity, emigrated or joined the communist party.
Polish Socialist Party – Left; Polska Partia Socjalistyczna – Lewica	PPS–L	Unknown	Socialism; Proletarian internationalism	1906, 1926	1918, 1931	The faction's primary objective was to transform Poland into a Marxist state through proletarian revolution, with the likely aim of integrating into a Soviet-aligned international communist bloc (a position widely opposed by the Revolutionary Faction and viewed by many as a betrayal of Polish independence).
Polish Socialist Party – Revolutionary Faction; Polska Partia Socjalistyczna – Frakcja Rewolucyjna	PPS–FR	Józef Piłsudski	Polish nationalism; Socialism; Left-wing nationalism; Revolutionary nationalism	1906, 1926 (as Old Revolutionary Faction)	1918	With the failure of revolution in the Kingdom of Poland (1905-1907) PPS–Left lost popularity, and PPS–FR regained dominance. In 1909 PPS–FR renamed itself back to Polska Partia Socjalistyczna (Polish Socialist Party); the increasingly marginal PPS–L merged with Social Democracy of the Kingdom of Poland and Lithuania, led by Róża Luksemburg in 1918 to form the Communist Party of Poland.
Polish Union of Peasant Activists; Polski Związek Ludowców	PZL	Jan Bryl	Agrarianism	1923	1924	Functioned until 1924, when it united with the Polish People's Party "Left", forming the Agrarian Union. It published Sprawa Chłopska newspapers.
Popular Unity; Jedność Ludowa	JL	Jan Dąbski	Agrarianism	1923, 1926	1923, 1926	The party was formed on 26 May 1923, by splitting from Polish People's Party "Piast", and on 25 November 1923, it was incorporated into the Polish People's Party "Wyzwolenie". It split from it in January 1926, and in March 1926, it united with the Agrarian Union, forming the Peasant Party. The Popular Unity had published its newspapers, titled Gazeta Ludowa (Popular Newspaper).
Radical Peasant Party; Chłopskie Stronnictwo Radykalne	ChSR	Eugeniusz Okoń	Christian left; Agrarianism; Peasant movement	1919	1929	The 1928 elections saw the ChSR's vote share fall to 0.4%, and it lost all its seats in the Sejm. It ceased to exist the following year.
Union of Upper Silesians; Ferajn Gůrnoślůnzokůw	FG	Unknown	Silesian separatism	1918	1925	After the Union of Upper Silesians, the idea of Upper Silesian independence remained; in 1925 the chief of police in Gliwice told Alfons Proske, president of the province of Upper Silesia, "The idea of a free state is still alive in German Upper Silesia". In areas bordering Poland, former members of the Union of Upper Silesians returned to political parties, primarily the Catholic People's Party (German: Katholische Volkspartei), which said that it represented Germans and "German-disposed Silesians" in the Autonomous Silesian Voivodeship with the slogan "Upper Silesia for Upper Silesians". The Union of Upper Silesian Defence was founded in 1925 by former Polish activists, with Jan Kustos its chairman.
World Agudath Israel אגודת ישראל העולמית		Unknown	Torah Judaism	1912	Unclear	Agudath Israel gained a significant following, particularly among Hasidic Jews. It had representatives running in the Polish elections after the First World War, and they won seats in that country's parliament (Sejm). Among the elected representatives were Alexander Zusia Friedman, Rabbi Meir Shapiro, Rabbi Yosef Nechemya Kornitzer of Kraków, and Rabbi Aharon Lewin of Reysha.
Bloc of National Minorities; Blok Mniejszości Narodowych	BMN	Unknown	Minority politics; Ethnic minority interests; Regionalism; Federalism	1922	1930	In the 1930 elections (which were considered not free), it fared poorly (3% and the ninth largest party). In the political shakedown following the 1930 elections, the Bloc was dissolved.
Camp of National Unity; Obóz Zjednoczenia Narodowego	OZN	Zygmunt Wenda	Polish nationalism; National conservatism; Economic militarism; Economic nationalism; Anti-communism; Antisemitism	1937	1941	During World War II and the German occupation of Poland, OZN's underground military arm, created in 1942, was known as Obóz Polski Walczącej (the Camp of Fighting Poland).
Folkspartei יִדישע פֿאָלקספּאַרטײַ		Zemach Shabad	Jewish Autonomism; National personal autonomism; Non-Zionism; Economic liberalism	1905	1939	The party split in 1927 between the Warsaw branch, led by Pryłucki, and the Vilnius (then a part of Poland) branch, led by Dr. Zemach Shabad, less hostile to Zionism than the Warsaw branch but more Yiddish-centered. After the split the party seems to have declined, with an attempt to revitalize it in Warsaw in 1935. At the 1936 Jewish community elections in Warsaw, the Folkspartei only got 1 seat out of 50, while the Bund got 15.
German Socialist Labour Party of Poland; Deutsche Sozialistische Arbeitspartei Polens	DSAP	Johann Kowoll	Social democracy	1925	1940?	On August 26, 1939, the DSAP signed the joint statement of socialist parties in Poland, calling for the people to fight against Hitlerism (other signatories included the Bund).
Nonpartisan Bloc for Cooperation with the Government; Bezpartyjny Blok Współpracy z Rządem	BBWR	Walery Sławek	Palingenesis; Presidentialism; Civic nationalism; Guided democracy; Anti-politics; Anti-corruption	1927	1935	After the death of Józef Piłsudski (May 12, 1935), the weakened BBWR continued to exist until October 30, when Walery Sławek dissolved it. The tradition of the movement was continued by the Camp of National Unity, formed in February 1937.
Ukrainian National Democratic Alliance; Українське національно-демократичне об'єднання	УНДО	Dmytro Levytsky	Anti-communism; Christian democracy; Ukrainian nationalism	1925	1939	When Germany invaded Poland, UNDO declared its loyalty to the Polish state. After the Soviets annexed Eastern Poland, UNDO's former leader, Dr. Dmytro Levitsky, who had once been chief of the Ukrainian delegation in the pre-war Polish parliament, as well as many of his colleagues, were arrested, deported to Moscow, and never heard from again. UNDO along with all other legal Ukrainian political parties was forced by the Soviet authorities to disband. As a result, the Organization of Ukrainian Nationalists (OUN), which already had an underground structure dating to its time of conflict with the Polish authorities, was left as the sole functioning, independent, political organization in western Ukraine.
Polish Social Democratic Party of Galicia; Polska Partia Socjalno-Demokratyczna Galicji	PPSDG	Unknown	Democratic socialism; Social democracy	1890	1919	It was also known as Polish Social Democratic Party of Galicia and Cieszyn Silesia (Polska Partia Socjalno-Demokratyczna Galicji i Śląska Cieszyńskiego). From 1904 it closely worked with Polish Socialist Party, into which it was merged in 1919.

=== Defunct and historical parties Political parties before 1918 ===
- Polish Social Democratic Party – Polska Partia Socjaldemokratyczna (1890–1919)
- Polish Socialist Party – Polska Partia Socjalistyczna (1892–1948)
- Social Democracy of the Kingdom of Poland and Lithuania – Socjaldemokracja Krolestwa Polskiego i Litwy (1893–1918)
- Polish Socialist Party of the Prussian Partition – Polska Partia Socjalistyczna Zaboru Pruskiego (1893–1919)
- Polish Socialist Party – Revolutionary Faction – Polska Partia Socjalistyczna – Frakcja Rewolucyjna (1893–1918)
- National-Democratic Party – Stronnictwo Narodowo-Demokratyczne (1897–1919)
- National Workers' Union – Narodowy Związek Robotników (1905–1920)
- Polish Socialist Party – Left – Polska Partia Socjalistyczna – Lewica (1906–1918)
- Christian Democratic Party – Stronnictwo Chrześcijańskiej Demokracji (1919–1937)
- Polish Socialist-Democratic Party of Galicia and Cieszyn Silesia – Polska Partia Socjalno-Demokratyczna Galicji i Śląska Cieszyńskiego
- Progressive-Democratic Union – Związek Postępowo-Demokratyczny
- Real Politics Party – Stronnictwo Polityki Realnej
- Polish People's Party – Polskie Stronnictwo Ludowe
- National Workers' Faction – Narodowe Stronnictwo Robotników
- Peasantry Union – Związek Stronnictwa Chłopskiego
- Popular Christian Party – Stronnictwo Chrześcijańsko-Ludowe
- Polish Popular Centre – Polskie Centrum Ludowe

=== Polish Lithuanian Commonwealth ===
- Patriotic Party
- Hetmans' Party
- Familia party

== See also ==
- Politics of Poland
- List of political parties by country
- List of politicians in Poland
