= Chadecja =

Chrześcijańska Demokracja or Chadecja can refer to several parties in Poland that are connected to the Christian democracy movements:

in the Second Polish Republic:

- Christian Democracy - Labor Party (Chrześcijańska Demokracja - Stronnictwo Pracy)
- Polish Christian Democratic Party (Polskie Stronnictwo Chrześcijańskiej Demokracji)
- Christian Union of National Unity (Chrześcijański Związek Jedności Narodowej), commonly known as Chjena

in the Third Polish Republic

- Christian Democracy of the 3rd Republic of Poland (Chrześcijańska Demokracja III Rzeczypospolitej Polskiej)

See also: Chieno-Piast
