= 1923 Kraków riot =

Political unrest in Poland in 1923

- Part of history of Kraków
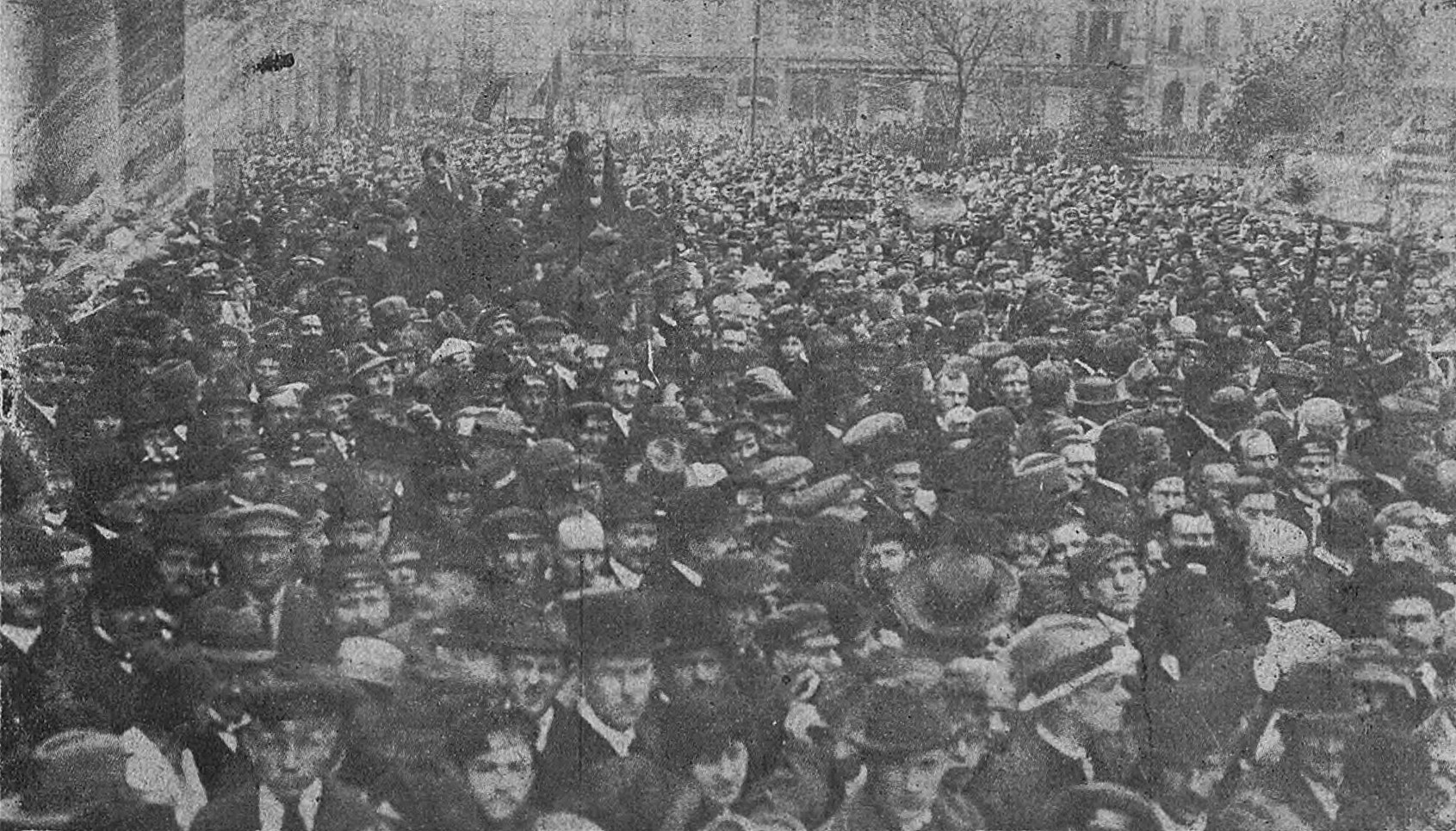
- Workers demonstration in Kraków, November 1923
- Date: 6 November 1923
- Location: Kraków, Poland
- Caused by: Government crackdown on striking workers

Parties
Republic of Poland: Polish Army; State Police	Polish Socialist Party

Casualties and losses
14 soldiers killed, 101 soldiers and 31 policemen injured	18–30 killed, 10+ seriously wounded

The 1923 Kraków riot, or 'riots', or 'bloody Kraków events', took place during a demonstration on 6 November 1923 in Kraków, Poland. The incident is also called the 1923 Kraków uprising, particularly by Marxist sources. Demonstrators took control of the Main Market Square area and disarmed some troops. Eventually troops and police were ordered to fire on the workers, but some soldiers refused. Three armored cars were used, one of which, named Dziadek ("Grandpa"), was captured by the workers in the Market Square area.

Some 18 to 30 workers were killed, as well as 14 soldiers. No policemen died, but 31 were injured.

== Background ==
Poland regained independence in 1918 (see Partitions of Poland), in the aftermath of the First World War, but was involved in several military conflicts, such as Polish-Soviet War, until late 1920. After the wars, the newly-reconstituted country had to deal with a difficult economic situation, including economic depression and hyperinflation. Workers rights were curtailed, their material situation drastically worsened, and Polish socialists were in opposition to the coalition government of Endecja and Chjeno-Piast, with Wincenty Witos as prime minister. At the same time, Witos and his men were afraid that Józef Piłsudski, who for the time being was staying in his estate in Sulejowek, would use any opportunity to return to power. The Marshal was officially presenting himself as a private person, but his house was carefully watched by the police.

In the fall of 1923, hundreds of strikes took place across the country. At first, Polish government adopted a lenient policy towards workers' demonstrations, but after a scandal in 1922 in which a carriage with Polish president was pelted by stones by the workers while police did nothing, that policy changed. In October 1923, railroads were militarized, and the striking rail workers were drafted into the army. In Kraków, where workers' strikes and demonstrations were occurring as well, the local military commander, General Józef Czikiel, introduced special courts for striking rail workers. In response, on November 5, the Polish Socialist Party (PPS) proclaimed a general strike.

== Riots in Kraków ==
On 5 November the government forbade any demonstrations, but the decree was disregarded by the workers of Kraków. Therefore, troops, some of them armed with machine guns, were deployed on the streets of the city and in crucial positions across the city early in the morning of November 6. A day earlier, the PPS had declared a general strike in response to the government's militarization of the railways, which had been ordered to end a month-long strike of the railway workers, and other restrictions. Workers clashed with the police, but the situation did not progress further that day.

Another large workers' demonstration began in the late morning of 6 November and resulted in the events described in some sources as Bloody Tuesday. It began when the protesters approached Worker's House, located on Dunajewskiego Street, where a demonstration was planned for that day. However, it was locked, and in front of it were the police, some of them with rifles and bayonets. Angry workers came closer to the police, and one of the officers, positioned in a nearby hotel, fired at the crowd. That was the spark that ignited the crowd. The demonstrators rushed at the police and disarmed some of the officers. At the same time, a Polish Army regiment, called to help the police, appeared in Planty Park. The workers began chanting, "Long live Józef Piłsudski!" Upon hearing the chant, the soldiers put down their weapons and honoured their beloved commandant. Soon, rifles were in the hands of the demonstrators, many of whom were well-trained veterans of the Polish-Soviet War.

As the situation escalated, local authorities called uhlans of the 8th Regiment, under Rotmistrz Lucjan Bochenek, an experienced soldier, who ordered his subordinates to charge on the crowd, but the horses were unable to run on the wet streets, and many of them slipped and fell. The workers dispersed, with a number of them hiding in nearby houses, where they opened fire. Bochenek and his deputy, Mieczyslaw Zagorski, were killed, and shocked uhlans were disarmed. Another cavalry unit was also disarmed, and its commandant, shot in both legs, was unable to control the soldiers, who, after hearing workers chant "Long live Pilsudski! Down with the government of Witos!", mingled with the crowd, giving up their weapons.

Upon the orders of General Czikiel, Colonel Becker was left in charge of the army units sent to fight the demonstrators. Becker, finding out about failure of the mounted troops, sent in infantry regiments, who on the previous night had been transported from Katowice and the area of Lwow. Meanwhile, workers were erecting barricades and clashing with the police and troop units again. The Internationale was sung. The demonstrators took control of the Main Market Square area and disarmed some troops. Eventually, troops and police were given orders to fire on the workers, but some soldiers refused to do so. Three armored cars were used; one of which, named Dziadek, was captured by the workers in the area of the market square. The driver of the armored car was killed, and two other soldiers inside were seriously wounded.

Around mid-day on November 6, the centre of the city was under control of the workers, with police and army units stationed around Kraków Main station, and offices of the voivode. Rumours began to circulate among the demonstrators that large army units with artillery were on their way. However, the government in Warsaw, anxious about the situation, had already begun negotiations with the opposition, and a five-hour truce was declared, which prevented further fighting. Altogether, about 18 to 30 workers and 14 soldiers were killed (including 11 cavalryman from an ill-fated charge), and 101 soldiers were wounded. No policeman were killed, but 31 were injured. Among the civilians, 10 were seriously wounded. The demonstrators also killed 61 army horses.

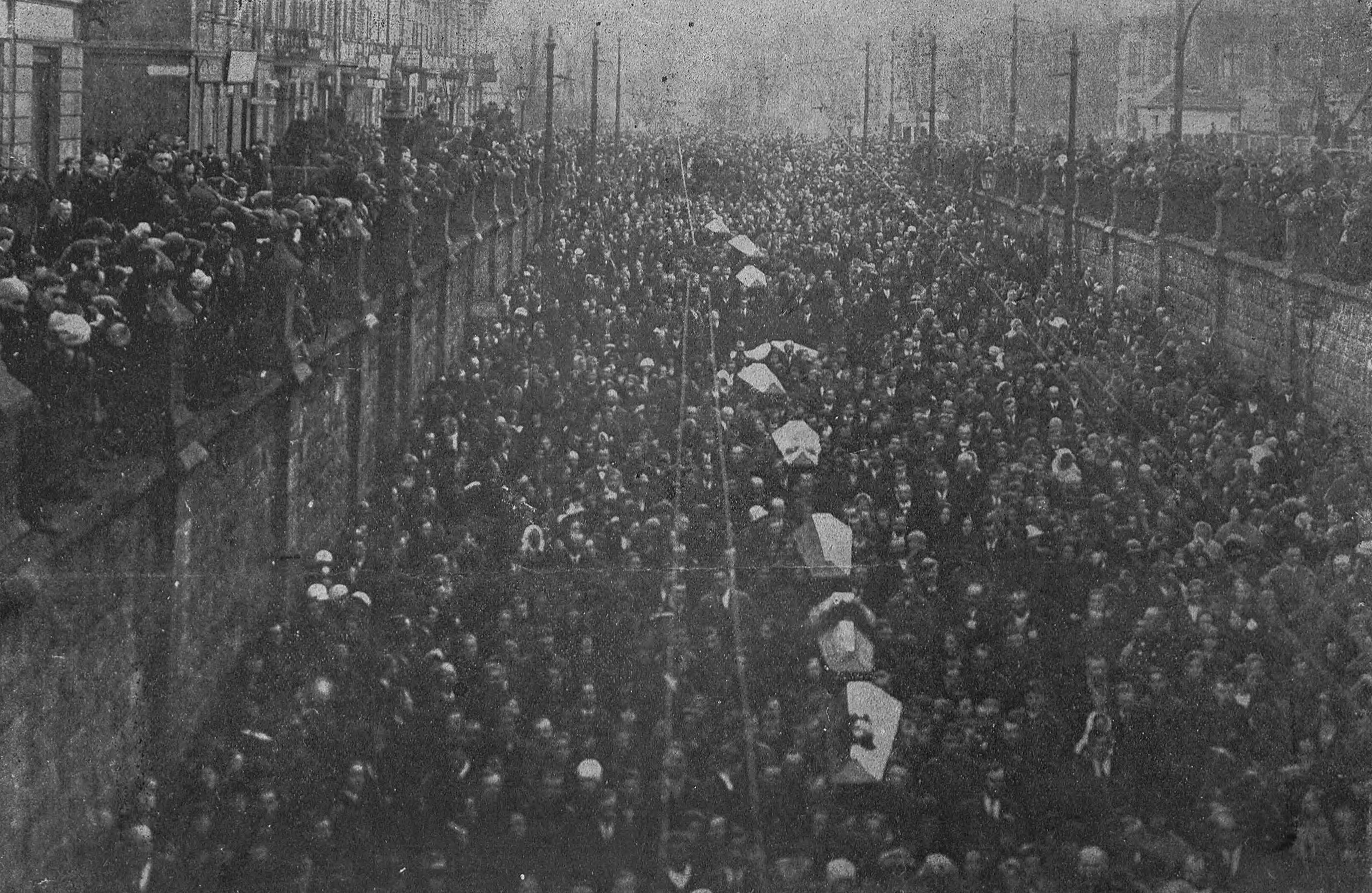
Funeral procession for the workers killed during the uprising

== Aftermath ==
By 6 November the Polish government declared that it was willing to negotiate with PPS, a ceasefire was agreed upon and the riots subsided. The government agreed to reverse its decision about the militarization of the railways; the unpopular voivode of Kraków Voivodeship, Kazimierz Gałecki, was replaced by Karol Olpiński; and General Józef Czikel (commander of the Kraków Military District No. V) was replaced by Lucjan Żeligowski. In return, the socialists promised to end the strike and urged all workers to return to work the next day. In Kraków, the police withdrew from the streets, which were temporarily patrolled by the armed workers.

The increasingly unpopular Chjeno-Piast government would resign in December 1923, partly from its handling of the Kraków riots. Apart from Kraków, there were in early November 1923 violent street demonstrations and clashes with police in other southern Polish cities, such as Tarnów, and Boryslaw, with a number of people wounded or killed. All killed cavalrymen were buried at Kraków's Rakowicki Cemetery, where a monument with their names was erected.

== See also ==
- September Uprising (Communist unrest in Bulgaria)
