= Popular National Union =

Popular National Union Związek Ludowo-Narodowy
- Founded: May 1919; 107 years ago
- Dissolved: 7 October 1928; 98 years ago
- Preceded by: National-Democratic Party
- Succeeded by: National Party
- Headquarters: Warsaw, Poland
- Ideology: Republicanism; Polish nationalism National Democracy; National liberalism National conservatism
- Political position: Right-wing
- National affiliation: Camp of Great Poland (from 1926)

Związek Ludowo-Narodowy (ZLN; English: Popular National Union) was a Polish political party aligned with the National Democracy political movement during the Second Polish Republic, gathering together right-wing politicians with conservative and nationalist opinions.

Between 1919 and 1926, the Popular National Union achieved considerable electoral success but at no point governed alone. It could only supply individual ministers (e.g. in finance, education or foreign affairs) to successive governments after 1923 in cooperation with the National Democrats and the peasants' party (Chjeno-Piast). In the 1922 presidential elections, the Popular National Union nominated Count Maurycy Zamoyski to counter the centrist Gabriel Narutowicz and the socialist Stanisław Wojciechowski of the Polish People's Party “Piast”.

After the May 1926 Coup, the Popular National Union gradually lost its influence and power in the wake of internal schisms and conflicts under the rule of its rivals, the Sanation regime. In 1928 the Popular National Union morphed into the National Party (Stronnictwo Narodowe).

== Genesis ==
The ZLN origins as a political party lay in the postwar Europe of late 1918. In December of that year and shortly before the elections, an alliance arose known as the "National Election Committee of Democratic Parties" (Narodowy Komitet Wyborczy Stronnictw Demokratycznych) composed of the following: National Democracy (Narodowa Demokracja); National Unity (Zjednoczenie Narodowe); the Christian Workers' Party (Chrześcijańskie Stronnictwo Robotnicze); and the Polish Progressive Party (Polska Partia Postępowa). During the 1919 elections this alliance obtained 109 seats with most of its representatives hailing from western "Greater Poland)". Wojciech Korfanty became the president of this grouping with Stanisław Grabski, Konstanty Kowalewski and Józef Teodorowicz as vice-presidents. In February 1919 this alliance morphed into the National Parliamentary Popular Union (Związek Sejmowy Ludowo-Narodowy).

== Beginnings ==
The ZLN was established in May 1919 at the 1st Congress of the National Popular Union. At the beginning, the ZLN was a federation of political parties, but the summer of 1919 saw the departure of the Christian-National Workers Club (Chrześcijańsko-Narodowy Klub Robotniczy) from its ranks. This split greatly homogenized the character of the ZLN, a change evident by its second congress conference in October 1919.

In January 1919, a group of National Democrats attempted a coup d’état to bring down the leftist government of Jędrzej Moraczewski. The ZLN's Marian Januszajtis-Żegota and Eustachy Sapieha participated in this unsuccessful attempt.

On 16 January 1919, a non-aligned government arose with the cooperation of ZLN members Władysław Seyda as Minister of the “Prussian” District, Józef Englich in finance, and Reverend Antoni Stychel as Deputy Speaker of Parliament. When the situation at the front of the Polish-Soviet War became critical in spring 1920, the ZLN were prominent in their vocal criticism of Piłsudski and soon inspired the creation of the Council of National Defense (Rada Obrony Państwa) with Roman Dmowski (the de facto intellectual leader of the National Democrats).

At the time, the ZLN's political manifesto could be summarized in a few points:

  - Nationalism
  - Unity of the nation
  - Elimination of class divisions
  - Germany as the main threat to Poland
  - A policy of restraint towards expansion in the East
  - Support for a private-capitalist economy, objection to government interference
  - Support for worker's insurance and land reform, but opposition to coercive land redistribution
  - Continuation of Polish national traditions
  - The significant position of the Roman Catholic Church
  - A strong parliament and a reduction of the powers of the President

The National Democrats held a very strong position in western Poland (Wielkopolska), but considerably less so in Congress Poland (Kongresówka), which included the capital of Warsaw. Hence in January 1919, they reached a compromised with Piłsudski, and when in summer 1920 the government of Wincenty Witos came into being, it obtained the full support of the ZLN.

From the second half of 1921 and into 1922, the ZLN opposed the Chief of State as well as the centrist political parties. Before the elections in 1922, the rightist Christian National Union (Chrześcijański Związek Jedności Narodowej) included the Popular-National Union, the National Workers Party (Narodowe Stronnictwo Robotnicze), the Polish Christian-Democratic Party (Polskie Stronnictwo Chrześcijańskiej Demokracji) and the National Christian Peasant Party (Narodowo-Chrześcijańskie Stronnictwo Ludowe). It won 98 seats (22%) in the Sejm (Polish Parliament) and 29 seats (26%) in the Senate.

Later that same year, a nominee of the National Democrats, Maurycy Zamoyski, was defeated by Gabriel Narutowicz in a runoff fifth round of voting in parliament. Narutowicz would be assassinated a few days after his election by a fanatical ultra-nationalist painter, Eligiusz Niewiadomski.

== 1923-1928 ==
On 17 May 1923, the Lanckorona Pact saw representatives of the ZLN, the Christian-National Labour Party (Chrześcijańsko-Narodowe Stronnictwo Pracy), and PSL Piast agreeing to a broad set of policies, including increased Polonization of the Kresy, implementation of Numerus clausus, the acceleration of land reform the assignment of governmental portfolios exclusively to Poles, and joint policies against the political left. The effect of this agreement was the so-called Chjeno-Piast government created on 28 May 1923. It was headed by Witos on the ZLN's behalf. This ministry also included Stanisław Głąbiński, Marian Seyda and Wojciech Korfanty, and would later include Roman Dmowski

=== Program ===
ZLN foreign policy was pro-French and anti-German. In the East, ideas were presented for the full incorporation of Western Ukraine, Western Belarus, and the Wilno region into Poland. From the ZLN's point of view non-Poles in the Republic were considered second-class citizens up to the moment they underwent linguistic and cultural assimilation.

Support for the ZLN was comprised in the main by:

  - city dwellers (mainly the urban middle and lower-middle class, and sections of the right-wing intelligentsia)
  - workers from Łódź
  - landed gentry and peasants who voted under their influence

Geographic centers of National Democracy included:

  - Pomerania (Pomorze)
  - Western Poland (Wielkopolska)
  - Warsaw
  - Upper Silesia

=== Further activity ===
On 26 October 1924, the fourth ZLN Congress proposed a program on the future development of the party, which led to a marked increase in the discipline within the party apparatus. A "Supreme Council" (Rada Naczelna) with Stanisław Głąbiński as president and a Board of Directors (Zarząd Główny) numbering 30 emerged from the reorganization. Workmen and country departments were created in order to increase membership. Communists were to be banned from holding elected office once the ZLN gained power.

From November 1923, Prime Minister Grabski tried to come to a political understanding with representatives of national minorities in Poland; this created conflicts within the government. On 13 November 1925, the Grabski government collapsed and was replaced by the administration of Aleksander Skrzyński with representatives of the ZLN, the Christian Democrats (Chrzreścijańska Demokracja), the National Workers Party (Narodowa Partia Robotnicza), the PSL “Piast”, and the Polish Socialist Party (Polska Partia Socjalistyczna). Jerzy Zdziechowski in Finance and Stanisław Grabski as the Minister of Religion and Education represented the ZLN in this government.

In 1925, the ZLN declared that only Poles who are Christians and who accept the party's program, statute, regulations, and resolutions can become members. On 10 May 1926, the third Witos government was created, in which Zdziechowski and Grabski again took part. This government would be overthrown by Józef Piłsudski's May Coup. From 1926, in response and in opposition to Piłsudski's political movement, a "Union of Polish Nationalists" was postulated. However, some within the movement were becoming more and more radical, influenced by the European fascist movement. On 4 December 1926, the Camp of Great Poland (Obóz Wielkiej Polski) appeared. Its founders’ intention was to take the place of the ZLN. On 7 October 1928, the ZLN dissolved itself in the wake of repressions from the Sanacja regime and was replaced by the National Party (Stronnictwo Narodowe).

== Structure ==
The regional structure of the party consisted of:

  - regional administrations,
  - district boards electing district administrations,
  - rural (communal) and urban units with a president or a board headed by a president.

The most important party institution was the Supreme Council (Rada Naczelna). During the second meeting it was stated that it consists of all ZLN representatives, 100 members chosen by Congress, and one delegate from each district. Later, the membership was slightly changed: 60 members were chosen by Congress and 3 delegates from each district. The Supreme Council chose the Board of Directors, a governing board consisting of 5 members, which nominates the president.

Newspapers that presented similar values as the ZLN were Gazeta Warszawska (Warsaw Gazette), Przegląd Narodowy, Gazeta Poranna, Myśl Narodowa, and Słowo Polskie.

== Electoral results ==
=== Sejm ===
Election	Votes			Seats		Rank	Government	Leader of the national list
Election	#	%	±pp	#	+/−	Rank	Government	Leader of the national list
1919	1,616,157	29.0	▲29.0%	140 / 394	▲140	1st	in opposition	Joachim Bartoszewicz
1922	2,551,582	29.0	▲	98 / 444	▲13	1st	in opposition	Stanisław Głąbiński
1922	As part of the Christian Union of National Unity coalition, which won 163 seats in total.							
1928	925,570	8,1	▼	38 / 444	▼	4th	in opposition	Stanisław Kozicki
