= Labour Party (Poland, 1925) =

Labour Party Partia Pracy
- Founded: 1925
- Ideology: Social democracy
- Political position: Centre-left

The Labour Party (Polish: Partia Pracy) was a Polish political party active in the interwar period, created in 1925. The party was formed by politicians who had left Polish People's Party "Wyzwolenie" (PSL-Wyzwolenie) in protest of the PSL's support for land reform which would have broken up large landholders' estates without compensation. In 1926, the party supported Józef Piłsudski during the May Coup. In 1928 it became part of "Nonpartisan Bloc for Cooperation with the Government" (BBWR). Between 1929 and 1930, together with the Związek Naprawy Rzeczypospolitej (Organization for the Reform of the Republic) it formed the "Zjednoczenie Naprawy Wsi i Miast". After the creation of Camp of National Unity (OZON), most of the activists of the party joined it, and the party did not nominate separate candidates in the 1930 elections.
