= Polish-Catholic People's Party =

Polish-Catholic People's Party Polsko-Katolicka Partia Ludowa (Polish)
- Leader: Wiktor Kulerski
- Founded: 29 December 1912
- Dissolved: 1918
- Merged into: Polish People's Party "Piast"
- Newspaper: Gazeta Grudziądzka
- Ideology: Agrarianism; Anti-communism
- Political position: Center-right
- Colors: Green

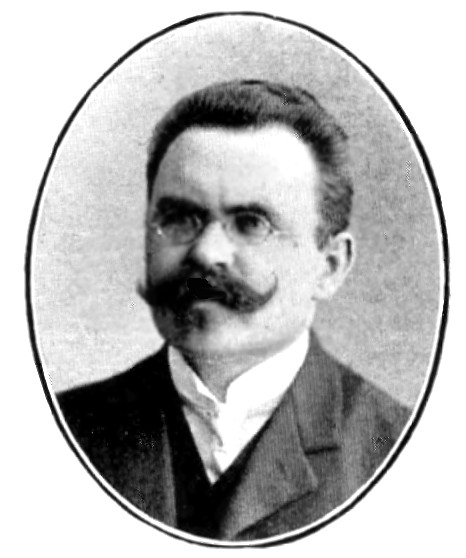
Party founder Wiktor Kulerski

The Polish-Catholic People's Party (Polish: Polsko-Katolicka Partia Ludowa, PKPL) was an agrarian Polish political party founded in 1912 by the media magnate Wiktor Kulerski.

== History ==
Wiktor Kulerski operated the Grudziądz Gazette (Polish: Gazeta Grudziądzka), one of the largest newspapers in Poland. Despite for a time being cordial with the National Democratic (Endecja) movement, being a member of the Polish Democratic Society (later Democratic-National Society), he eventually came into conflict with them due to his support for compromise with German Empire. The conflict culminated in Kulerski founding the Polish-Catholic People's Party. Despite their conflict, the PKPL still occasionally cooperated with Endecja. Kulerski worked with them in an attempt to create an apolitical education committee. During World War I, PKPL supported the German Empire and its plans to create a German-aligned Polish state.

After the war, PKPL in Poland united with Polish People's Party "Piast". However, its remnants continued operating in regions with a Polish minority within the Weimar Republic.

== Ideology ==
The party supported compromise with Germany, while opposing Germanization. It opposed the Endecja movement and socialism. PKPL defended the Catholic Church, with several priests contesting elections to the Reichstag under the party's patronage.
