= Polish Catholic Bloc =

Polish Catholic Bloc Polski Blok Katolicki (Polish)
- Leader: Wincenty Witos; Józef Chaciński
- Founded: 1928
- Dissolved: 1928
- Ideology: Christian democracy Agrarianism; Parliamentarism; Republicanism
- Members: Polish People's Party "Piast"; Polish Christian Democratic Party

The Polish Catholic Bloc (Polish: Polski Blok Katolicki, PBK) was a Christian-democratic electoral alliance in Poland. Its full name was the Polish Catholic Bloc of the Polish People's Party "Piast" and Christian Democracy (Polish: Polski Blok Katolicki Polskiego Stronnictwa Ludowego „Piast” i Chrześcijańskiej Demokracji).

== History ==
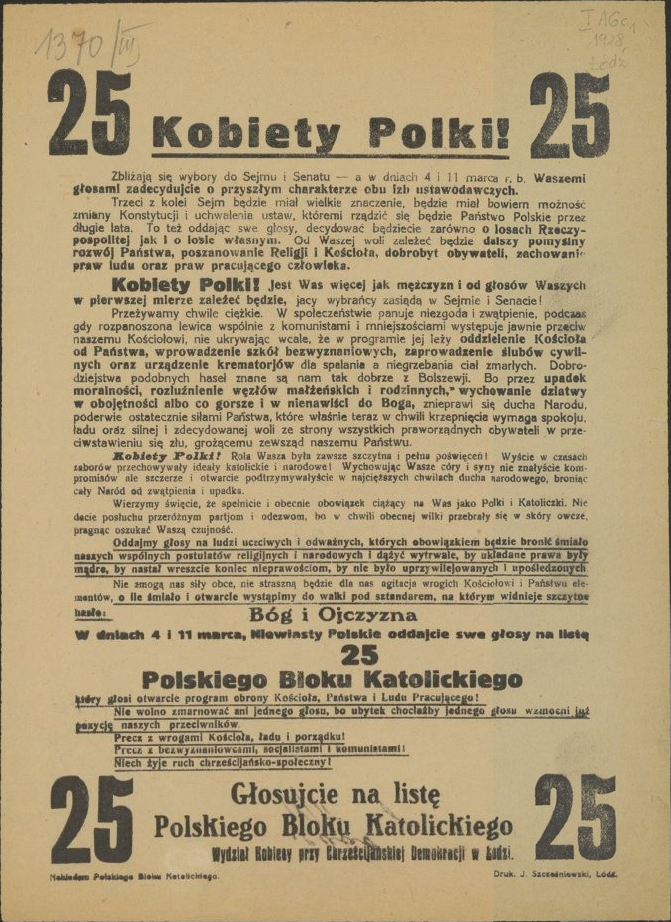
A Bloc flyer encouraging women to vote

The Bloc was founded in 1928 to contest that year's parliamentary election by the Polish People's Party "Piast" and Polish Christian Democratic Party. It organized election gatherings before election day, like a Housekeepers' gathering on 26 February. In the 1928 election, it received 34 Sejm and 6 Senat seats.

== Electoral results ==
=== Sejm ===
Election year	# of votes	% of vote	# of overall seats won	Government
1928	770,891	6.76 (#6)	34 / 444	BBWR

=== Senate ===
Election	# of votes	% of votes	# of overall seats won
1928	426,179	6.67 (#5)	6 / 111
