= Front Morges =

Political alliance in interwar Poland

The Front Morges was a political alliance of centrist political parties (Polish Christian Democratic Party, National Workers' Party, Związek Hallerczyków) of interbellum Poland. It was founded in 1936 in the Swiss village of Morges by Generals Władysław Sikorski, Józef Haller and former Polish prime minister Ignacy Paderewski.

Prominent activists included Józef Haller, Wojciech Korfanty, and Karol Popiel. They opposed Poland's Sanation regime – which had caused some of them to emigrate abroad. They wanted to form a new government with Paderewski as president and Wincenty Witos as prime minister. They demanded Poland's democratization and closer ties with France.

The Front Morges gained little publicity or support in Poland, but in 1937 led to the formation of a new political party there, the Labor Party (Stronnictwo Pracy), which would become part of the political basis for the Polish Government-in-Exile during 1939–1945.
