= Polish Christian Democratic Party =

Polish Christian Democratic Party Polskie Stronnictwo Chrześcijańskiej Demokracji
- Founded: 1919
- Dissolved: 1937
- Headquarters: Warsaw, Poland
- Ideology: Political Catholicism; Christian democracy
- Political position: Centre-right
- Religion: Catholicism
- International affiliation: White International

Polish Christian Democratic Party (Polish: Polskie Stronnictwo Chrześcijańskiej Demokracji, PSChD, commonly known as Chrześcijańska Demokracja or Chadecja), was a Polish Christian democratic political party that existed in the first year of the Second Polish Republic. Its leader and main activist was Wojciech Korfanty.

In 1922, Chadecja became part of the Chrześcijański Związek Jedności Narodowej (Chiena) coalition. Part of the Chjeno-Piast coalition after signing the Lanckorona Pact in 1923.

After the May Coup of 1926, split into three factions. Member of Centrolew coalition in 1929. Member of Front Morges coalition in 1937, and merged with National Workers' Party to form the Labour Party.

== Election results ==
=== Sejm ===
Election	Votes	%	Seats	Seat Change
1922	2,551,582	29.12 (#1)	44 / 444	-
1922	As part of the Christian Union of National Unity coalition, which won 163 seats in total.			
1928	770,891	6.7 (#6)	16 / 444	▼28
1928	As part of the Polish Catholic Bloc which won 33 seats in total			
1930	430,074	3.79 (#6)	14 / 444	▼2

=== Senate ===
Election	Votes	%	Seats	Seat Change
1922	2,173,756	38.70 (#1)	7 / 111	-
1922	As part of the Christian Union of National Unity coalition, which won 48 seats in total.			
1928	426,060	6.66 (#5)	6 / 111	▼1
1928	As part of the Polish Catholic Bloc which won 6 seats in total			
1930	160,444	2.36 (#7)	2 / 111	▼4

== Literature ==
- Kuk, Leszek (2004). Kaiser, Wolfram; Wohnout, Helmut (eds.). A Powerful Catholic Church, Unstable State and Authoritarian Political Regime: The Christian Democratic Party in Poland. Routledge. pp. 123–140. ISBN 0-7146-5650-X.
