= Lanckorona Pact =

Pact to increase influence of the Catholic Church 1923

Lanckorona Pact (Polish: Pakt lanckoroński) was an agreement between Polish center (Polish People's Party "Piast") and right wing parties (primarily Związek Ludowo-Narodowy and Polskie Stronnictwo Chrześcijańskiej Demokracji and several smaller parties, known as the Christian Union of National Unity alliance or Chjena) on 17 May 1923 in Warsaw. The politicians of those parties agreed to pursue stricter polonization policies and to increase the role of Catholic Church in the state. Furthermore, the program of Polonization of the Eastern Borderlands was to be initiated.

The agreement led to the dismissal of the government of Władysław Sikorski and creation of the Chjeno-Piast coalition on 28 May, with the new government of Wincenty Witos. Former Polish chief of state, Józef Piłsudski, also resigned his governmental posts in protest, claiming that he would not participate in the government, which is made of parties responsible for death of President Gabriel Narutowicz.

The pact was signed at Warsaw's apartment of Juliusz Zdanowski, one of leaders of Zwiazek Ludowo-Narodowy. Its name refers to the fact, that it was negotiated in the real estate of Senator Ludwik Hammerling, who was elected in the district which included the village of Lanckorona.
