= Tomasz Rowiński =

- Born: September 23, 1981 (age 44); Warsaw, Poland
- Education: University of Warsaw
- Occupations: Historian, Editor, Columnist
- Known for: Editor-in-chief of Christianitas quarterly and christianitas.org portal

Tomasz Rowiński (born September 23, 1981, in Warsaw) is a Polish historian of ideas, columnist, and editor.

== Biography ==
Rowiński graduated from the University of Warsaw's Institute of Applied Social Sciences in 2005, where he was associated until 2009. From 2005 to 2008, he collaborated with the journal Res Publica Nowa and from 2006 to 2010 worked at the Centre for the Thought of John Paul II in Warsaw. During this time, he also contributed to the weekly magazine Idziemy. From 2011 to 2014, he served as the secretary of the editorial office of the quarterly Fronda. He was a columnist for Tygodnik Bydgoski and, from 2014 until its closure in 2020, a collaborator of the quarterly Opcja na Prawo. Since 2008, he has been the editor of the quarterly Christianitas. Since 2015, he has coordinated the publication of the book series Biblioteka Christianitas. In January 2019, he began cooperating with the weekly magazine Do Rzeczy, and since August 2020, he has been a member of its team. In 2019, he collaborated with the weekly magazine of the Institute of Literature Nowy napis. Since 2022, he has been a columnist for the quarterly Homo Dei published by the publishing house of the Warsaw province of Redemptorists, in the same year he also joined the editorial board of the portal Afirmacja.info. He has also published in titles such as Rzeczpospolita, weekly Plus Minus, Tygodnik Powszechny, Znak, Polonia Christiana, Kultura Liberalna, Political Theology, Presses, New Confederation. Also in foreign titles: L'Homme noveau, The Catholic Herald, echo24.cz and others.

He is the author of books with interviews popularizing issues of faith and theology, as well as the editor of the selection of journalism Dispute about Rymkiewicz. In 2015 he became one of the signatories of the Letter to the General Assembly of the Synod for the Family prepared by the Catholic Community Forum “Between Synods”. In the same year he published the author's essay book Dante's Bastards. Sketches about the disappearance and rebirth of visible Christianity. In 2018, the second essay book Kingdom not of this world. About the principles of Catholic Poland based on newer and older events was published, which in the preface was announced as the first part of the “Polish-Roman trilogy”. Since January 2019, he has been a member of the Association of Saint Benedict Patron of Europe (ASBPE). In the spring of 2019, he published a book entitled Alarm for the Church. New Reformation? together with Pawel Milcarek.
