= Residents' Wola =

Local political organization in Warsaw, Poland

Residents' Wola Wola Mieszkańców
- Chairperson: Aneta Skubida
- Founded: 2016
- Headquarters: 13 Skierniewicka Street, Warsaw, Poland
- Political position: Left-wing
- Warsaw district councils: 2 / 425

Residents' Wola (Note: Polish pronunciation: [ˈvɔla]; Polish Wola Mieszkańców; "Wola" is a name of a city district, but can be also directly translated to "will", with the full name meaning "the will of the residents") is a local association of the residents of Wola, a city district in Warsaw, Poland. It was founded in 2016.

== History ==
The organisation, then an informal coalition of local politicians under the name Wola of the Change (Polish: Wola Zmian) had run in the 2014 local elections for the seats in the council of the district of Wola in Warsaw, Poland. It had gained 3714 votes (8.5%), which granted it the seat for its representative, Aneta Skubida.

Residents' Wola was founded in 2016. In the 2018 local elections, it has run as part of the coalition of The City Is Ours. City Movements, which has won 8882 votes (13.37%), granting it 2 seats in the district council of Wola. In the 2024 local elections, Residents' Wola won 3,733 (6.84%) votes, receiving 2 seats in the district council.

== Ideology and organisation ==
Residents' Wola is a local association of the inhabitants of Wola, a city district in Warsaw, Poland. It has three-person management, led by Aneta Skubida.

The association is guided by the principlea of engagement of the local population, transparency, fellowship, recognition, dialogue, accessibility to local representatives, and respect of the district history and identity. The organization is against chaotic and disorganised development in Wola. It additionally publishes its newspaper.
