= Wincenty Witos =

Polish statesman (1874–1945)

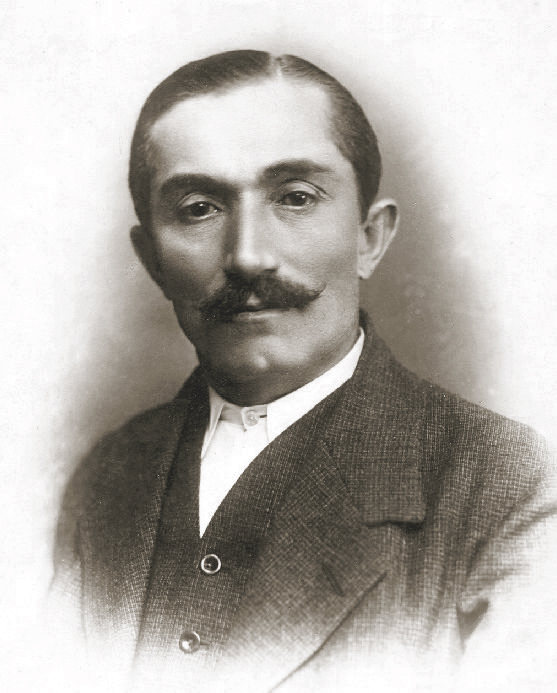
- Witos in 1920

Prime Minister of Poland
- In office 10 May 1926 – 14 May 1926
- President: Stanisław Wojciechowski
- Preceded by: Aleksander Skrzyński
- Succeeded by: Kazimierz Bartel
- In office 18 May 1923 – 19 December 1923
- President: Stanisław Wojciechowski
- Deputy: Stanisław Głąbiński; Wojciech Korfanty
- Preceded by: Władysław Sikorski
- Succeeded by: Władysław Grabski
- In office 24 July 1920 – 19 September 1921
- Chief of State: Józef Piłsudski
- Deputy: Ignacy Daszyński
- Preceded by: Władysław Grabski
- Succeeded by: Antoni Ponikowski

Personal details
- Born: 22 January 1874 Wierzchosławice, then Austro-Hungary, now Poland
- Died: 31 October 1945 (aged 71) Kraków, Poland
- Party: Polish People's Party "Piast"
- Profession: Farmer

Wincenty Witos (Polish pronunciation: [vinˈt͡sɛntɨ ˈvitɔs]; 21 or 22 January 1874 – 31 October 1945) was a Polish statesman, prominent member and leader of the Polish People's Party (PSL), who served three times as the Prime Minister of Poland in the 1920s.

He was a member of the Polish People's Party from 1895, and the leader of its "Piast" faction from 1913. He was a member of parliament in the Galician Sejm from 1908–1914, and an envoy to Reichsrat in Vienna from 1911 to 1918. Witos was also a leader of Polish Liquidation Committee (Polish: Polska Komisja Likwidacyjna) in 1918, head of the Piast party, and member of parliament in the Polish Sejm from 1919–1920.

He served three times as the premier of Poland, in 1920–1921, 1923 (Chjeno-Piast), and 1926. In 1926 the third Witos government was overthrown by the May coup d'état led by Józef Piłsudski. Witos had been one of the leaders of the opposition to the Sanacja-government as head of Centrolew (1929–1930) and co-founded the People's Party. He was imprisoned shortly thereafter, then lived in exile in Czechoslovakia from 1933 to 1939. Over that time, he was seen as "the messiah of the peasants." Post-exile, he returned to Poland only to be imprisoned again by the invading Germans.

In ill health by March 1941, he was put on supervised release by the Germans and ordered to stay in Wierzchosławice. In July 1944 the German occupation authorities requested that he declare an anti-Soviet appeal, but he refused to do so. In 1945, he was nominated one of the vice-chairmen of the State National Council (Polish: Krajowa Rada Narodowa) after World War II. In 1945–46 the People's Party was reorganized and taken over by Stanisław Mikołajczyk.

== Early life ==
Wincenty was born in a peasant family in Wierzchosławice. His parents were Wojciech and Katarzyna née Sroka. The family was poor, owning little land and no livestock and they lived in a single room hut which had been converted from a barn. Wincenty had two brothers, Jan and Andrzej. Andrzej would also become a leader in the Polish agrarian movement.

He began his education in the village school at the age of ten and finished four grades. Subsequently, he worked, helping his father, as a lumberjack for Prince Eustachy Stanisław Sanguszko.

Between 1895 and 1897 Wincenty served in the Austrian Army (Galicia was part of the Austrian partition of Poland), first in infantry then in the artillery. He was stationed in Tarnów, Kraków and Krzesławice.

He married Katarzyna Trach on 9 February 1898. His daughter Julia was born on 22 March 1899.

== Early political activity ==
At the age of nineteen he published his first newspaper article in the Przyjaciel Ludu ("Friend of the People") based in Lwów (Lviv, Lemberg), under the name "Maciej Rydz". In 1895 Witos joined the Galician Stronnictwo Ludowe ("People's Party") and in February 1903 he was elected to the Executive Committee of the party. In 1908 he was elected as a delegate to the Diet of Galicia in Lwow and served until 1914.

In April 1909 Witos was elected the wójt (mayor) of his native Wierzchosławice. During his tenure he focused on the economic development of the village, oversaw the construction of a mill and a social center, improved local roads, expanded the school and organized a farmer's cooperative and credit union. He gradually rose in the ranks of the agrarian movement.

== Road to independence ==
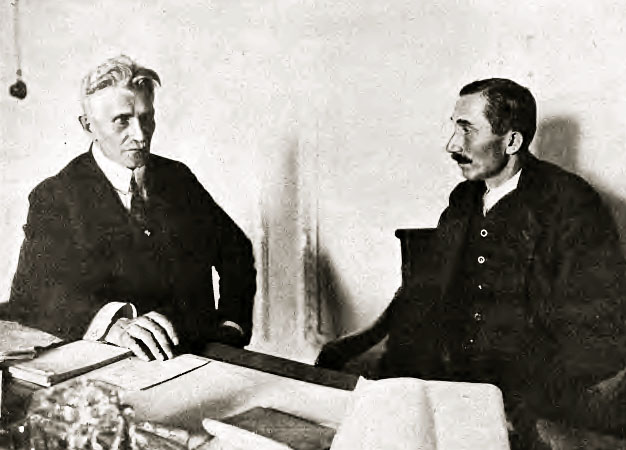
Wincenty Witos (right) and Ignacy Daszyński.

In December 1913 the People's Party split. As a result, in February 1914, Witos was elected as vice president of the newly created political party Polskie Stronnictwo Ludowe "Piast" (Polish People's Party "Piast"). In 1911 he served as a deputy of the party to Austria's Imperial Council's House of Representatives. Technically he remained the member of the Austrian government until 1918.

After the outbreak of World War I in 1914, Witos became even more involved in party activities. The group joined the Supreme National Committee a quasi-government for the Poles in Galicia, for which Witos served as vice president. As the political events associated with the war unfolded and the Committee became more and more irrelevant, Witos resigned.

During the war Witos kept in touch with Polish independence movement activists, including Ignacy Paderewski and Jędrzej Moraczewski. He also supported Józef Piłsudski, whom he saw as the future leader of a reconstituted Polish army. "Piast"'s backing for Piłsudski increased after the Oath Crisis and the internment of Piłsudski by the Germans. Gradually, the agrarians of the Polish People's Party came to believe that the cause of Polish independence was best served by an alliance with the alliance and so began supporting the pro-Entente, anti-German, National Democrats. In 1917 Witos joined Roman Dmowski's National League although he left the organization in 1918.

In 1916 he became the president of "Piast". He co-wrote a manifesto, which declared the aims of a reconstituted, independent Poland and was published in May 1917. On 28 September 1918, he was one of the two directors of the Polish Liquidation Committee, a temporary government whose purpose was to preserve law and order in the former Austrian partition during the transition to an elected Polish government. The Committee declared Western Galicia independent of the Austria-Hungary. Witos was invited to join the government of Ignacy Daszyński but turned the offer down for political differences. Witos was also unsatisfied with the fact that the new government had no representative from the Prussian Partition.

== Prime Minister: 1920-1921, 1923, 1926 ==
=== Second Cabinet ===
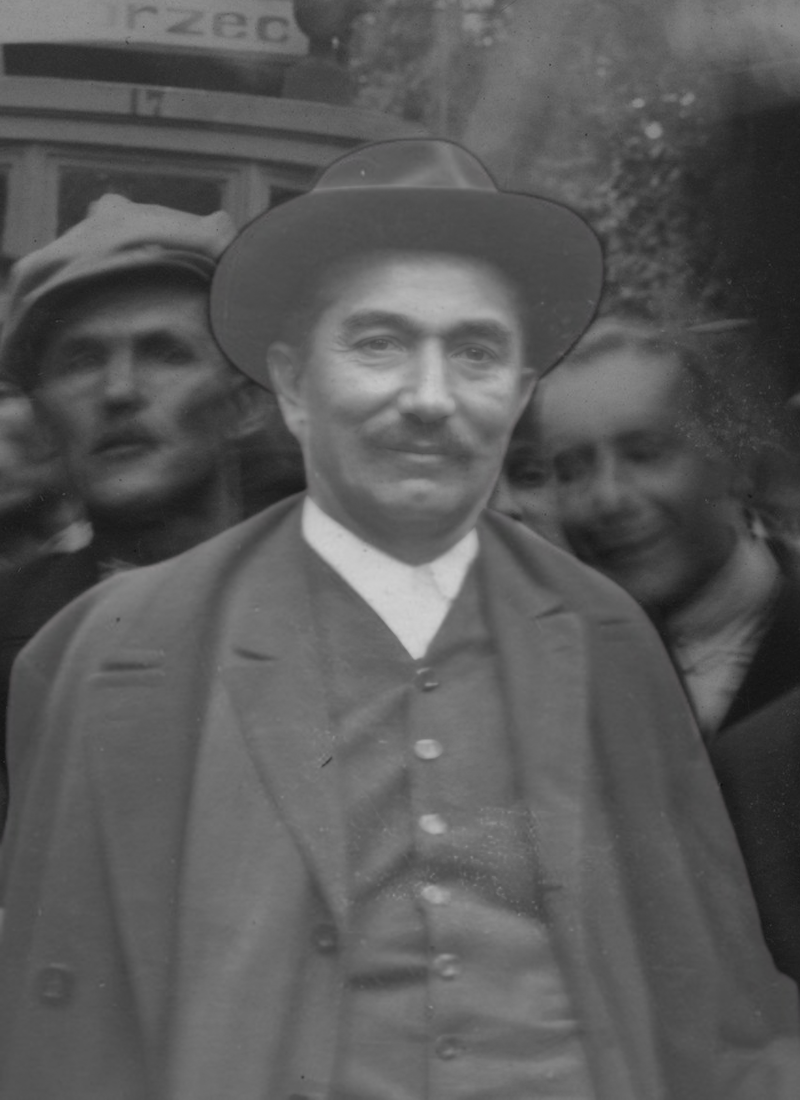
Witos in 1925

On 17 May 1923, an agreement was held in Warsaw between the Polish centre (Polish People's Party "Piast") and right-wing parties (primarily Związek Ludowo-Narodowy and Polskie Stronnictwo Chrześcijańskiej Demokracji and several smaller parties, known as the Christian Union of National Unity alliance or Chjena) called the Lanckorona Pact (Polish: Pakt lanckoroński). The politicians of those parties agreed to pursue stricter polonization policies and to increase the role of Catholic Church in the state. Furthermore, the program of Polonization of the Eastern Borderlands was to be initiated. The pact was signed at Warsaw's apartment of Juliusz Zdanowski, one of the leaders of Zwiazek Ludowo-Narodowy. Its name refers to the fact, that it was negotiated in the real estate of Senator Ludwik Hammerling, who was elected in the district which included Lanckorona. The agreement led to the dismissal of the government of Władysław Sikorski and creation of the Chjeno-Piast coalition on 28 May, with the new government of Witos. Former Polish chief of state, Józef Piłsudski, resigned claiming that he would not participate in the government, which is made of parties responsible for the death of President Narutowicz.

He resigned in December 1923.

=== Third Cabinet and Coup d'état ===
In November 1925, the government of Prime Minister Władysław Grabski was replaced by the government led by Minister of Foreign Affairs Aleksander Skrzyński, which had received support from the National Democrats and the Polish Socialist Party. General Lucjan Żeligowski became the new government's minister of military affairs. However, after the PPS withdrew its support, this government also fell and was replaced by that of Witos, formed by the Polish People's Party "Piast" and the Christian Union of National Unity (Chjeno-Piast). However, the new government had even less popular support than the previous ones, and pronouncements from Józef Piłsudski, who viewed the constant power shifts in the Sejm as chaotic and damaging, set the stage for a coup d'état. Apart from domestic turmoil, Polish politics had been shaken by a trade war with Germany, begun in June 1925, and by the signing of the Treaty of Locarno on 1 December. Under the terms of the treaty, the World War I western European Allied powers plus Germany guaranteed the inviolability of the German border with Belgium and France as determined by the Treaty of Versailles. On 10 May 1926, a coalition government of Christian Democrats and Agrarians was formed, and that same day Józef Piłsudski, in an interview with Kurier Poranny (the Morning Courier), said that he was "ready to fight the evil" of sejmocracy and promised a "sanation" (restoration to health) of political life. The newspaper edition was confiscated by the authorities.

The night of 11 to 12 May, a state of alert was declared in the Warsaw military garrison, and some units marched to Rembertów, where they pledged their support to Piłsudski. On 12 May, they marched on Warsaw and captured bridges over the Wisła River. Meanwhile, Witos' government declared a state of emergency. At about 17:00 hours, Marshal Piłsudski met President Stanisław Wojciechowski on the Poniatowski Bridge. Major Marian Porwit who commanded one of the troops loyal to the government), reported to the president, then reported to Piłsudski and witnessed the discussion between the two dignitaries. Piłsudski demanded the resignation of Witos' cabinet, while the President demanded Piłsudski's capitulation. After the failure of negotiations and the president's departure, Major Porwit refused Piłsudski to let him cross the bridge. On 14 May, at about 13:00 hours, Witos' cabinet decided to move from the Belweder Palace to Wilanów. Wojciechowski allowed this decision an hour later. After transferring to Wilanów, Wojciechowski and Witos negotiated with the commanders of troops loyal to the cabinet. The military decided they should move to Poznań and maintain the armed struggle from beyond. Eventually, to prevent the Warsaw fighting from turning into a country-wide civil war, both Wojciechowski and Witos decided to resign and issued an order to their troops to cease fratricidal fighting. A new government was formed under Prime Minister Kazimierz Bartel, with Piłsudski as the new Minister of Military Affairs. On 31 May 1926, the National Assembly nominated Piłsudski to be president, but he declined. Eventually Ignacy Mościcki became the new president; Piłsudski, however, wielded much greater de facto power than his military ministry nominally gave him.

== Post-Premiership ==
=== Centrolew ===
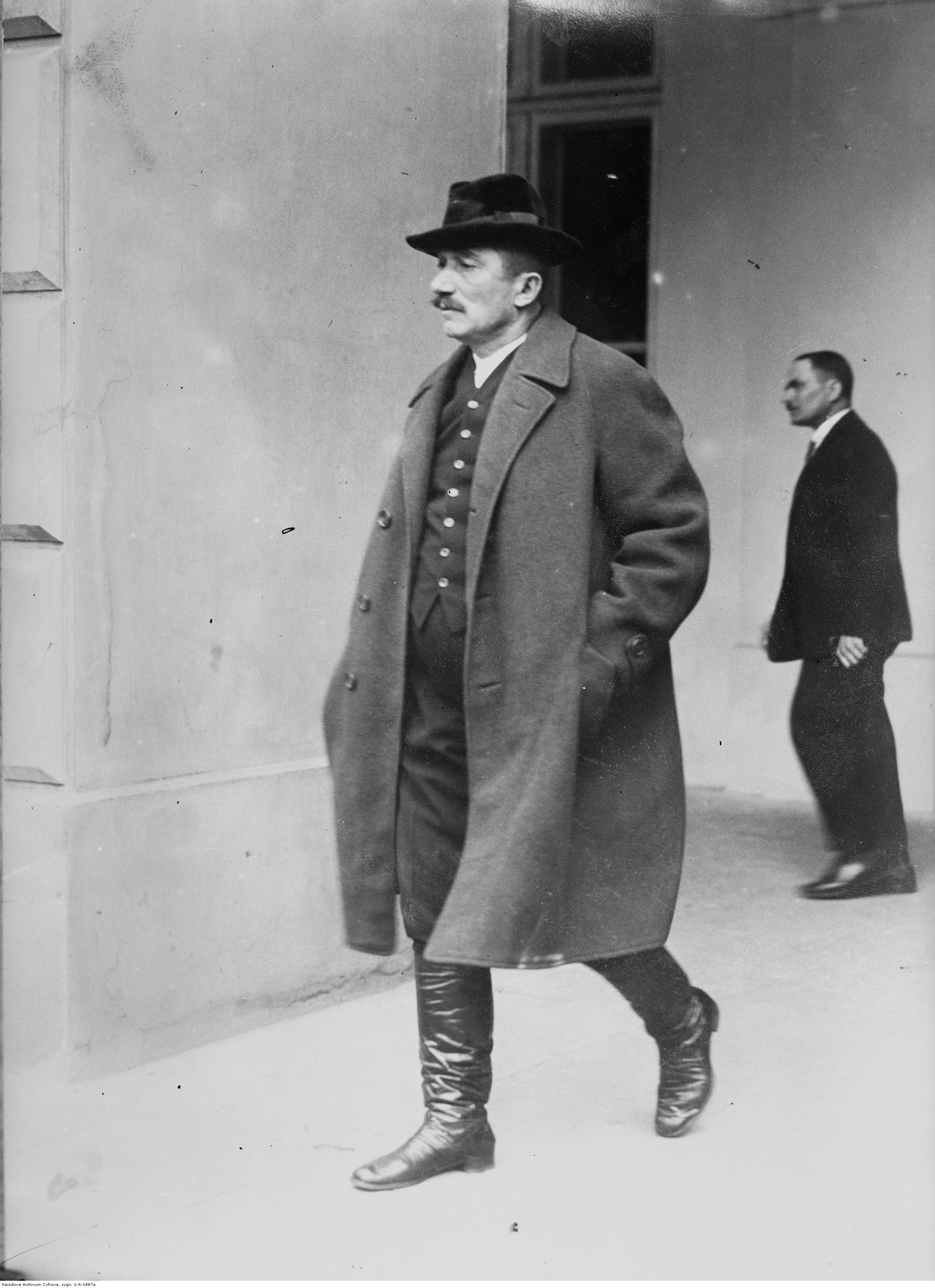
Witos in 1928

On 26 May 1926, Witos resigned as President of the Polish People's Party "Piast" shortly after his removal from power, though it was not adopted. He resigned in 1927 as President of the Małopolska Agricultural Society due to the limitation of state financial assistance. On 18 August 1927, the Krakow Provincial Office dissolved the Union of Commune Heads, which was created by Witos and operating in Lesser Poland under his own leadership. In the 1928 Polish legislative election, Witos successfully applied for parliamentary re-election as the member of the Sejm for the Tarnów district, by obtaining the largest number of votes for this constituency. On 9 April 1929, the Voivode of Kraków Voivodeship Mikołaj Kwaśniewski, removed Witos from the Tarnów local government board, to which he served as a member of this board since 1905. Witos remained in clear opposition during the Sanation regime.

From 1929–1930, Witos was one of the leaders of Centrolew (English: Centre-left), a coalition of several Polish political parties (Polish People's Party "Wyzwolenie", Polish People's Party "Piast", National Workers' Party, Polish Socialist Party and Christian-democratic parties). The coalition was directed against Piłsudski and the Sanation government. Witos participated, among others at the Congress of Defense of People's Rights and Freedom in Krakow (organized by Centrolew) in June 1930, during which he gave a speech.

=== Brest trials ===
The Polish Sanation government had invalidated the 1930 election results by disbanding the parliament in August and with increasing pressure on the opposition started a new campaign, the new elections being scheduled for November. Using anti-government demonstrations as a pretext, 20 members of the opposition, including most of the leaders of the Centrolew alliance (from Polish Socialist Party, Polish People's Party "Piast" and Polish People's Party "Wyzwolenie") were arrested in September without a warrant, only strictly on the order of Józef Piłsudski and the then Minister of Internal Security, Felicjan Sławoj Składkowski, accusing them of plotting an anti-government coup. The opposition members (who included Witos, and Wojciech Korfanty) were imprisoned in the Brest Fortress, where their trial took place (thus the popular name for the election: the 'Brest election'). The detainee (including Witos' inmates and opponents of the Sanation) were beaten and humiliated. Witos was ordered, among others manually cleaning latrines and emptying faeces buckets. A little later he was taken to the arrest in Grójec. On 27 November 1930 (the same day he was re-elected to the Sejm), Witos left prison, his bail was set at 10,000 zloty.

Regardless of Sanation's struggle against the well-known parties, Witos declared the need to consolidate with peasant groups. On 15 March 1931, he formed the "united" People's Party from the merger of three other, smaller, peasant-based parties: the Polish People's Party "Piast", Polish People's Party "Wyzwolenie" and left-wing Stronnictwo Chłopskie (SCh). On 26 October 1931, the Brest trial began in Warsaw. Witos and the other 10 accused were charged with the fact that in the period from 1928 to 9 September 1930, following the communicating between each other and acting consciously, they jointly prepared an assassination attempt whose purpose was to forcefully remove members of the Council of Ministers and replace them by other people, although without a fundamental change state system. None of the accused pleaded guilty after 55 hearings from the trial. Witos used the opportunity to explain the harsh criticisms of Sanation's actions, starting with the May Coup of 1926. Among others, Witos stated:

Your Honor, I was the president of this government that was overthrown by the May coup. So I wasn't plotting, I wasn't plotting, but I, along with the government, was the victim of a plot and assassination. This government was not a usurper government, it was a constitutional government, in a lawful manner, in a completely lawful manner appointed by the President of the Republic of Poland. Someone else was swinging, someone else was plotting, and I am sitting on the bench!

During the trial, Witos's lawyer was attorney Stanisław Szurlej. The accused were acquitted of the charge of preparing a coup d'état, though they were convicted of their activities. Witos was sentenced to 1/5 years in prison and deprived of public rights for 3 years. Witos was imposed a fine of PLN 80, similar to the fine imposed on Kazimierz Bagiński. The Brest trial ended in January 1932, with 10 accused receiving sentences up to three years of imprisonment; the appeals of 1933 confirmed the sentences. On 7–11 February 1933, an appeal hearing was held which culminated in the approval of the first-instance judgment. On 9 May, the Supreme Court cancelled this judgment and referred the case back to the court. On 11–20 July, a second hearing was held before the Court of Appeal which found the first judgment justified. The verdict was finally approved by the Supreme Court, which on 2–5 October, reconsidered the appeal of the defenders. Five of the convicts went to prison to serve their sentence. Witos, Adam Pragier, Wladyslaw Kiernik, Kazimierz Baginski and Herman Lieberman went into exile, before the approval of the judgment by the Supreme Court. They wrote in a joint statement:

We will not again be hostage to the dictatorship, as in 1930 ... The country demands from us not martyrdom, but a struggle to remove the mafia, which established its reign on lies, harm and depravity of characters. We left Poland to continue fighting the hated dictatorship.

Political offices
Preceded by Władysław Grabski	Prime Minister of Poland; 1920–1921	Succeeded by Antoni Ponikowski
Preceded by Władysław Sikorski	Prime Minister of Poland; 1923	Succeeded by Władysław Grabski
Preceded by Aleksander Skrzyński	Prime Minister of Poland; 1926	Succeeded by Kazimierz Bartel
