= May Coup (Poland) =

1926 coup d'état in Poland

May Coup Przewrót majowy
- Part of the interwar period
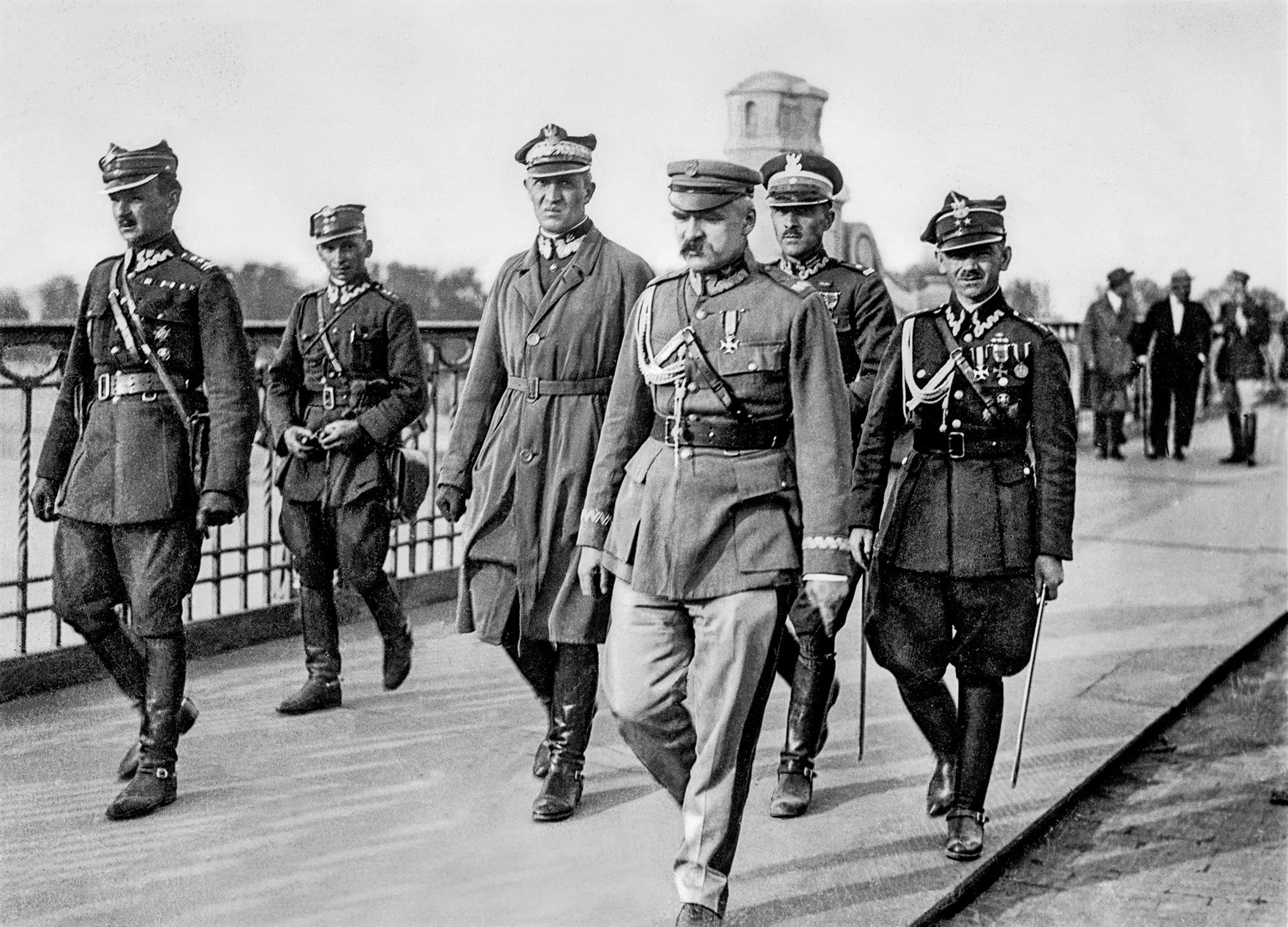
- Józef Piłsudski and other coup leaders on Poniatowski Bridge in Warsaw.
Date	12–14 May 1926
Location	(Second Polish Republic) Warsaw, Poland
Result	Sanation victory: President Wojciechowski and Prime Minister Witos capitulate; Military seizes power; Józef Piłsudski becomes de facto ruler

Belligerents
(Second Polish Republic) Sanation-loyal army	(Second Polish Republic) Government-loyal army

Commanders and leaders
Józef Piłsudski	Stanisław Wojciechowski; Wincenty Witos

Strength
12,000	6,000–8,000

Casualties and losses
- Military killed: 215; Civilians killed: 164; Military and civilian wounded: 920; Total: 1,299

The May Coup (Polish: przewrót majowy or zamach majowy) was a coup d'état carried out in Poland by Marshal Józef Piłsudski from 12 to 14 May 1926.

The attack of Piłsudski's supporters on government forces resulted in the overthrow of the democratically-elected government of President Stanisław Wojciechowski and Prime Minister Wincenty Witos and caused hundreds of fatalities.

A new government was installed, headed by Kazimierz Bartel. Ignacy Mościcki became president. Piłsudski remained the dominant politician in Poland until his death in 1935.

== Background ==
Józef Piłsudski, who controlled politics in the reestablished Polish state to a considerable degree, had lost his advantage in the aftermath of the failed Kiev offensive of spring 1920. He retained high esteem in segments of the armed forces that originated from his earlier activities.

In November 1925, the government of Prime Minister Władysław Grabski was replaced by the government of Prime Minister Aleksander Skrzyński, which had received support from the National Democrats and the Polish Socialist Party (PPS). General Lucjan Żeligowski became the new government's minister of military affairs. After the PPS withdrew its support, this government also fell and was replaced by one headed by Prime Minister Wincenty Witos, formed by the Polish People's Party "Piast" and the Christian Union of National Unity (Chjeno-Piast). The new government, however, had even less popular support than the previous ones, and pronouncements from Piłsudski, who viewed the constant power shifts in the Sejm (Polish parliament) as chaotic and damaging, set the stage for the coup.

The coup events were also inspired by Piłsudski's perception of the need for extraordinary measures in the face of the emerging threats to the maintenance of Poland's independence. These included Piłsudski's assessment of the Locarno Treaties signed by the German Weimar Republic and the French Third Republic in 1925, and the Treaty of Berlin, concluded by Germany and the Soviet Union in 1926.

Polish politics were shaken by a trade war with Germany that had started in June 1925. On 16 October, the Treaty of Locarno was signed; the Western Allies of World War I guaranteed the stability of western, but not eastern borders of Germany.

== Coup d'état ==
On 10 May 1926, the coalition government of Christian Democrats and Agrarians (PSL) was formed. On the same day, Józef Piłsudski, in an interview with the newspaper Kurier Poranny ('The Morning Courier'), said that he was "ready to fight the evil" of sejmocracy (a contemptuous term for a rule by Polish parliament) and promised a "sanation" (restoration to health) of political life. The newspaper edition was confiscated by the authorities.

The night of 11–12 May, a state of alert was declared in the Warsaw military garrison, and some units marched to Rembertów, where they pledged their support to Piłsudski. On 12 May, they moved on Warsaw and captured bridges over the Vistula River. The government of Prime Minister Wincenty Witos declared a state of emergency.

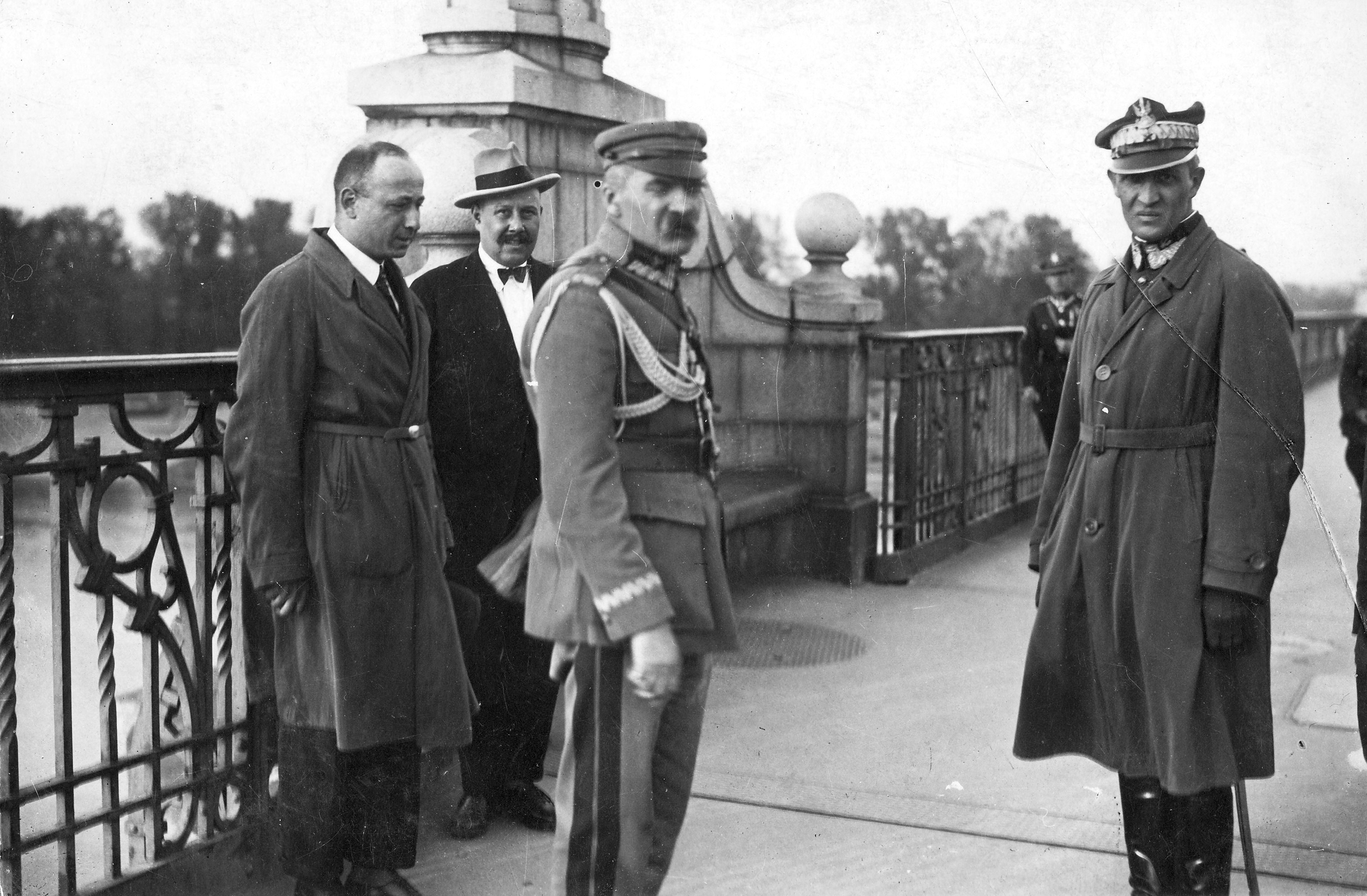
Piłsudski (center) on Poniatowski Bridge, Warsaw, 12 May 1926, during the May Coup. At right is General Gustaw Orlicz-Dreszer.

At about 17:00, Piłsudski met President Stanisław Wojciechowski on the Poniatowski Bridge. Piłsudski demanded a resignation of the Witos cabinet, but the president demanded capitulation of Piłsudski's forces. No agreement was reached and fighting erupted at about 19:00 hours.

The next day, a new round of negotiations began, mediated by Archbishop Aleksander Kakowski and Marshal of the Sejm Maciej Rataj. They brought no change to the stalemate.

On 14 May, the Polish Socialist Party declared its support for the rebels and called for a general strike, supported by the Railwaymen's Union (Związek Zawodowy Kolejarzy). The strike by socialist railwaymen paralyzed communications and kept pro-government military reinforcements from reaching Warsaw.

Eventually, to prevent the fighting in Warsaw from escalating into a nationwide civil war, Wojciechowski and Witos gave up and resigned their offices.

During the events, 215 soldiers and 164 civilians were killed, and some 900 people were wounded. A symbolic victim was the student Karol Levittoux (the great-nephew of the Polish independence activist Karol Levittoux), who was most likely killed by a non-commissioned officer fighting on the Piłsudskiite side.

A new government was formed under Prime Minister Kazimierz Bartel, with Piłsudski as minister of military affairs. On 31 May, the National Assembly (Zgromadzenie Narodowe) nominated Piłsudski to be president, but he declined. Eventually Ignacy Mościcki became the new president, but Piłsudski wielded real power from the time of the coup onward.

== Consequences ==
Piłsudski initiated a Sanation government (1926–1939), supposedly to restore moral fitness to public life. Until his death in 1935, Piłsudski played a preponderant role in Polish politics. He formally held the offices of defence minister and Inspector general of the armed forces in all governments until his death, two of which he headed himself in 1926–1928 and 1930.

The democratic March Constitution of Poland was replaced by Piłsudski and his supporters by the April Constitution in 1935. It was tailored to Piłsudski's specifications and provided for a strong presidency, but came too late for Piłsudski to assume that office. It remained Poland's constitution until the outbreak of World War II and was recognized by the Polish government-in-exile afterwards.
