= Chjeno-Piast =

Coalition of Polish political parties

Chjeno-Piast was an unofficial (yet common) name of a coalition of Polish political parties formed in 1923. It included the Polish People's Party "Piast" and an older coalition 1922 Christian Association of National Unity (Chrześcijański Związek Jedności Narodowej). The merger was passed during a meeting in the manor of senator L. Hammerling's from Lanckorona and at times it is referred to as Pact of Lanckorona.

The Chjeno-Piast coalition was the political base of two consecutive governments formed by Wincenty Witos. The first, formed in May 1923, antagonized Józef Piłsudski, who resigned his government posts blaming Chjeno-Piast for the assassination of Gabriel Narutowicz. This government was forced to resign in December of that year in the effect of massive worker riots in Kraków. The second, formed in May 1926, had even less support and was soon overthrown by the May Coup organized by Józef Piłsudski.

The first part of the name of the coalition (being an abbreviation of Chrześcijańska Jedność Narodowa) resembles the Polish word hiena, meaning hyena.
