= Christian Union of National Unity =

Polish electoral coalition in 1922

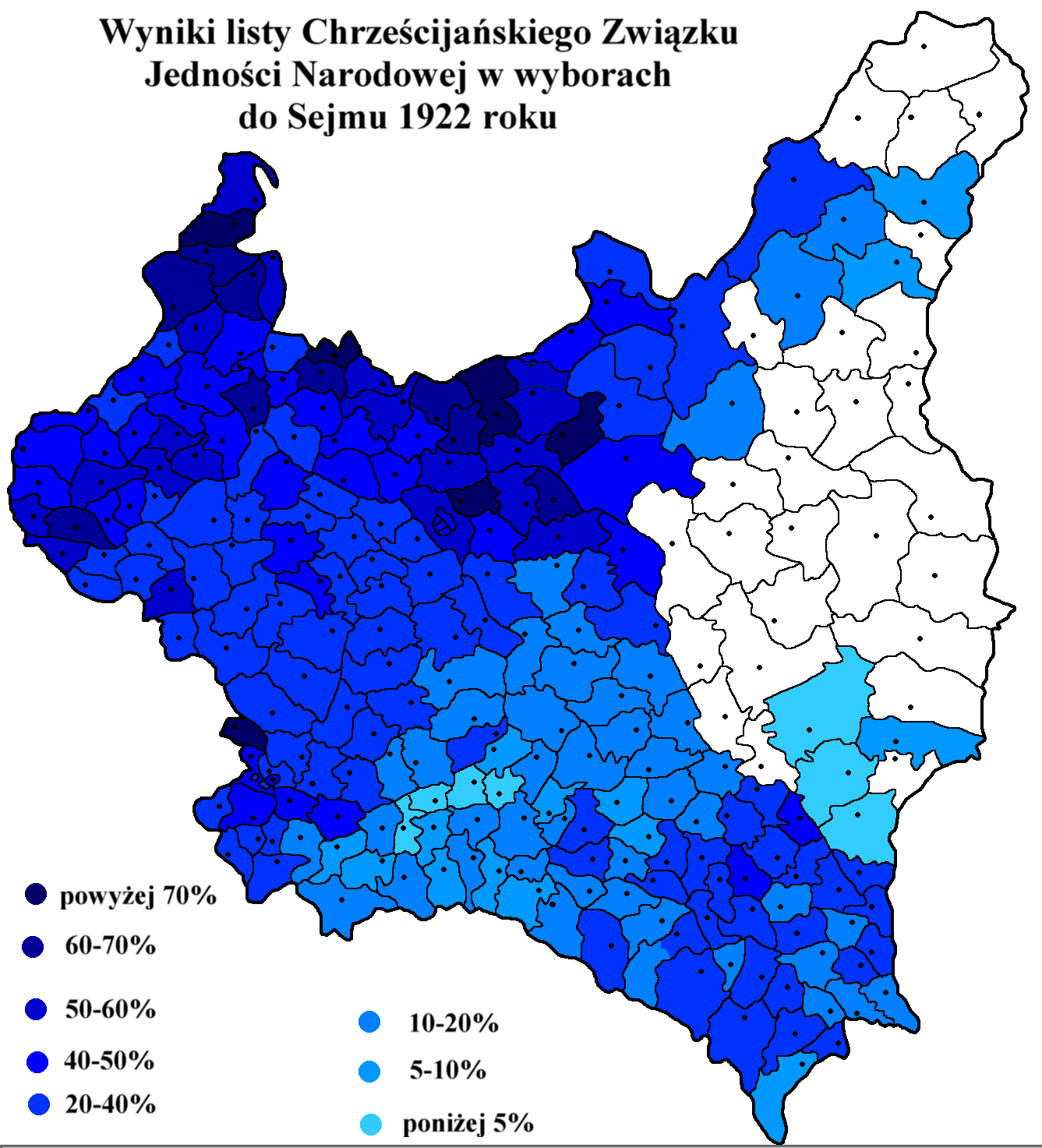
Results of the Christian Union of National Unity in the 1922 Polish legislative election

Christian Union of National Unity (Polish: Chrześcijański Związek Jedności Narodowej, ChZJN, commonly known as Chjena - the word pronounced as hiena, being the Polish name for hyena) was an electoral coalition of Popular National Union, Christian Democratic and other right wing parties for the 1922 Polish legislative election.

The coalition was composed of several smaller parties:

- Związek Ludowo-Narodowy
- Narodowo-Chrześcijańskie Stronnictwo Ludowe
- Chrześcijańsko-Narodowe Stronnictwo Pracy (PSChD)
- Chrześcijańsko-Narodowe Stronnictwo Rolnicze

Chjena gained many seats in the 1922 elections (163 parliament seats (out of 444) and 48 Senate seats (out of 111)), but it was not enough for a majority in the parliament (Sejm). After Lanckorona Pact it had become a part of the Chjeno-Piast government.

After the May Coup of Józef Piłsudski in 1926, the Chjena coalition was not formed again (see Centrolew).
