= Polish People's Party "Piast" (1913–1931) =

Polish People's Party "Piast" Polskie Stronnictwo Ludowe "Piast"
- Leader: Jakub Bojko (1914-18); Jan Sadlak (1918); Wincenty Witos (1918-31)
- Founded: February 1, 1914
- Dissolved: March 15, 1931
- Merged into: People's Party
- Headquarters: Warsaw
- Newspaper: Piast
- Ideology: Agrarianism; Christian democracy
- Political position: Before 1923: Centre-left; After 1923: Centre-right
- Religion: Roman Catholicism
- Colours: Green

The Polish People's Party "Piast" or Polish Peasant Party "Piast" (Polish: Polskie Stronnictwo Ludowe "Piast", PSL Piast) was a political party from the interwar period of the Second Polish Republic (1913–1931). Piast refers to the medieval Piast dynasty, Poland's founding royal house.

== Political significance ==
PSL Piast was an important political party in the Second Polish Republic. It was created in 1913 and after Poland regained independence in 1918, it formed a part of several governments, most notably after the Lanckorona Pact and in the Chjeno-Piast coalition. In 1931 it merged with Polish People's Party "Wyzwolenie" to form the People's Party. Its major politicians included Wincenty Witos, Jakub Bojko, Jan Dąbski, Maciej Rataj and Władysław Kiernik.

== Election results ==
=== Sejm ===
Election	Votes	%	Seats	Seat Change
1919	232,983	4.2 (#6)	46 / 394	n/a
1922	1,153,397	13.2 (#3)	70 / 444	▲24
1928	770,891	6.7 (#6)	17 / 444	▼53
1928	As part of the Polish Catholic Bloc which won 33 seats in total			
1930	1,965,864	17.3 (#2)	15 / 444	▼2
1930	As part of the Centrolew which won 79 seats in total			

== See also ==
- Polish People's Party
