= List of Polish Socialist Party politicians =

A list of notable Polish politicians of the historical Polish Socialist Party (Polish: Polska Partia Socjalistyczna).

== A ==
- Edward Abramowski
- Tomasz Arciszewski

== B ==
- Norbert Barlicki
- Bolesław Bierut
- Józef Biniszkiewicz
- Czesław Bobrowski

== C ==
- Adam Ciołkosz
- Józef Cyrankiewicz

== D ==
- Ignacy Daszyński
- Herman Diamand
- Bolesław Drobner
- Stanisław Dubois

== F ==
- Tytus Filipowicz
- Łukasz Foltyn

== G ==
- Julian Grobelny
- Feliks Gross
- Karol Grossmann

== H ==
- Julian Hochfeld
- Maksymilian Horwitz
- Tadeusz Hołówko

== I ==
- Piotr Ikonowicz

== J ==
- Henryk Jabłoński
- Maria Juszkiewicz

== K ==
- Kazimierz Kelles-Krauz
- Feliks Kon
- Wacław Kostek-Biernacki
- Maria Koszutska
- Halina Krahelska
- Jan Kwapiński

== L ==
- Oskar Lange
- Stanisław Leszczycki
- Herman Lieberman
- Bolesław Limanowski
- Jan Józef Lipski

== M ==
- Zygmunt Marek
- Mieczysław Michałowicz
- Henryk Minkiewicz

== N ==
- Mieczysław Niedziałkowski
- Andrzej Nowicki

== O ==
- Stefan Aleksander Okrzeja
- Edward Osóbka-Morawski

== P ==
- Antoni Pająk
- Kazimierz Pietkiewicz
- Józef Pinior
- Józef Piłsudski
- Aleksander Prystor
- Adam Próchnik
- Kazimierz Pużak

== R ==
- Tadeusz Rechniewski

== S ==
- Kazimierz Sosnkowski
- Władysław Studnicki
- Aleksander Sulkiewicz
- Walery Sławek
- Henryk Sławik

== T ==
- Tadeusz Tomaszewski
- Franciszek Trąbalski

== U ==
- Alfred Urbański

== W ==
- Walery Antoni Wróblewski
- Wanda Wasilewska
- Leon Wasilewski
- Zofia Wasilkowska
- Kazimierz Wojciechowski
- Stanisław Wojciechowski

== Z ==
- Zygmunt Zaremba
- Antoni Zdanowski

== Ł ==
- Augustyn Łukosz

== Ś ==
- Artur Śliwiński

== Ż ==
- Zygmunt Żuławski
