= Red Scouting of the Workers' University Society =

- Czerwone Harcerstwo Towarzystwa Uniwersytetu Robotniczego
- Formation: 2 February 1926
- Dissolved: September 1939
- Type: Socialist youth organization
- Purpose: Youth education, cultural and sporting activities
- Headquarters: Warsaw, Poland
- Region served: Poland
- Members: 4,000–6,000 (1938)
- Chairman: Stanisław Dubois
- Parent organization: Workers' University Society
- Affiliations: Socialist Educational International (from 1933)

The Red Scouting of the Workers' University Society (Polish: Czerwone Harcerstwo Towarzystwa Uniwersytetu Robotniczego), commonly known as Red Scouting (Polish: Czerwone Harcerstwo), was a left-wing Polish youth organization active from 1926 to 1939. It adopted some of the methods of the Scouting movement and organized cultural and sporting activities. Its educational programme promoted secularism, social equality and opposition to antisemitism.

The organization was established on the initiative of the Workers' Youth Organization of the Workers' University Society (OM TUR). It brought together boys and girls aged 12 to 16, who subsequently moved on to OM TUR, the Polish Socialist Party (PPS), trade union organizations or other political organizations. Its principal aim was to educate young people in the spirit of socialism and social equality.

Members participated in left-wing political campaigns, including activities in support of Republican Spain during the Spanish Civil War. The organization cooperated with the Workers' Society of Friends of Children (Polish: Robotnicze Towarzystwo Przyjaciół Dzieci) and the Jewish children's organization Socjalistiszer Kinder-Farband. Red Scouting operated mainly among working-class communities.

Its educational methods were modelled partly on those of the Polish Scouting and Guiding Association (ZHP), although its ideological orientation and programme differed considerably from traditional Scouting. Its leaders sought to educate young people in proletarian ideals, respect for human rights, solidarity with oppressed social groups, a sense of justice, willingness to help the disadvantaged and physical fitness.

The organization's motto was Bądź Gotów ("Be Ready"), used instead of the traditional Polish scouting greeting Czuwaj ("Be vigilant"). It expressed the idea of constant readiness to struggle for the interests of the proletariat.

== History ==
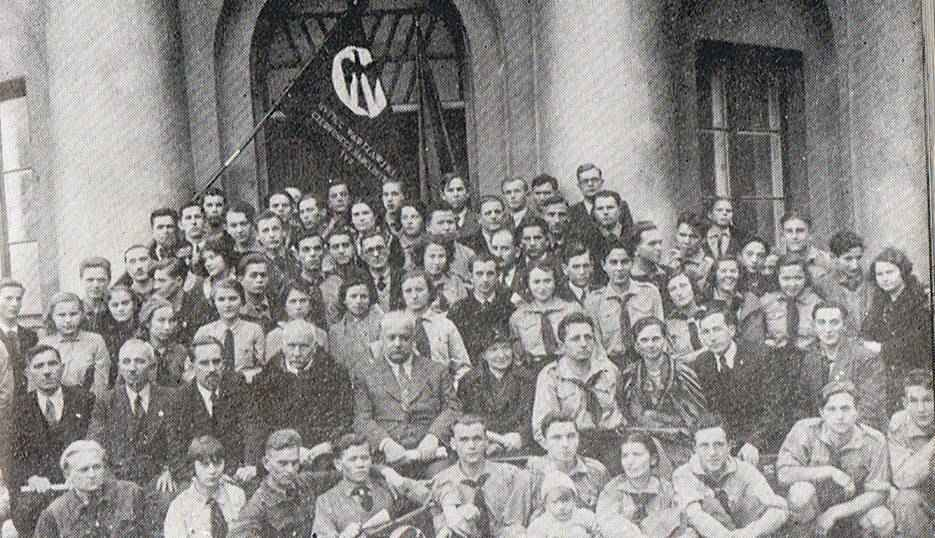
The Third National Conference of Red Scouting, held in Warsaw at the headquarters of the Railway Workers' Trade Union in May 1931. Among those pictured are Zygmunt Kazimierz Piotrowski, Tomasz Arciszewski, Kazimierz Czapiński and Stanisław Dubois

The first attempts to establish workers' educational organizations for children and young people took place in Galicia, under the influence of Austrian socialists, including Otto Kanitz, a pioneer of socialist Scouting and the youth movement.

In 1913, under the auspices of the Adam Mickiewicz People's University in Kraków, the socialist Society of Friends of Children was established. At the same time, an organization known as the "Red Scouts" emerged within the Polish Rifle Squads, supported by PPS politician Zygmunt Klemensiewicz.

Initially, activities aimed at young people were conducted within the Polish Scouting and Guiding Association. On the initiative of Adam Ciołkosz, the left-wing democratic Free Scouting movement (Polish: Wolne Harcerstwo) was established in 1921. Due to the radicalism of some of its communist-oriented activists and opposition from the leadership of the Polish Scouting and Guiding Association, the movement gradually became more independent of the organization. Socialist activists opposed to this development left it in 1923. After being transformed into the Union of Free Scouting (Polish: Zjednoczenie Wolnego Harcerstwa), the movement was dissolved by the authorities in 1924. Its activities provided one of the foundations for the future Red Scouting organization.

The development of socialist children's and youth movements in Europe, including the establishment of the International Committee of Socialist Educational Organisations in 1921, encouraged efforts to create a similar organization in Poland. The Polish initiative drew inspiration from the educational ideas of Austrian socialist pedagogue Anton Tesarek and the Austrian organization Rote Falken (Red Falcons).

The foundations of Red Scouting were laid during the first congress of OM TUR, held from 31 January to 2 February 1926. The congress adopted a resolution establishing a scouting organization based on instructors who had left the Polish Scouting and Guiding Association for ideological reasons. Among them was Stanisław Dubois, who had left the organization in 1919, at the age of 18. In June 1926, he became head of the Scouting Department of the Central Committee of OM TUR.

The first troops (Polish: gromady) were established in Warsaw in the spring of 1926. The Central Committee of OM TUR initially named them "Workers' Scouting Troops" (Polish: Robotnicze Gromady Harcerskie). In 1927, Red Scouting introduced its own ranks, proficiency requirements, uniforms, Scout Law and the motto Bądź gotów! ("Be ready!"). It operated under the supervision of the Workers' University Society youth organization.

In December 1927, the first conference of troop commanders was held, bringing together representatives of 30 troops. In July 1929, as the organization expanded, a Scouting Department was established within the Central Committee of OM TUR.

At the Third National Conference of Red Scouting, held on 17–18 May 1931, the organization became an autonomous body within the Workers' University Society. It subsequently expanded rapidly in major Polish cities, particularly Warsaw, Łódź and Gdynia, operating mainly among working-class communities.

In 1933, Red Scouting joined the Socialist Educational International. It also co-founded the Union of Independent Socialist Youth "Spartacus" (Polish: Związek Niezależnej Młodzieży Socjalistycznej "Spartakus").

In 1938, the organization had approximately 4,000–6,000 members grouped into 185 troops. Its press organ was the monthly magazine Gromada. State censorship frequently confiscated articles and sometimes entire issues. One example was an issue devoted to the 1 May celebrations in 1933.

Unlike organizations supported by the state, such as the Polish Scouting and Guiding Association, Red Scouting did not enjoy certain privileges, including railway travel discounts. Forestry authorities also refused to allow its members to camp on state-owned land. The leadership of the Polish Scouting and Guiding Association, particularly during its nationalist period, also sought to persuade state authorities to restrict Red Scouting's activities. One issue concerned cases in which Red Scouting troops were alleged to have presented themselves as ordinary scouting units.

During the German occupation of Poland, former members of Red Scouting participated in underground organizations associated with the socialist movement. Nevertheless, September 1939 is generally considered the end of the organization's existence as a formal organization.

In late October 1939, a meeting involving members of the Main Council and Warsaw troops took place with Stanisław Dubois. The participants decided to begin underground activities. A clandestine group was established in Warsaw on the basis of Red Scouting and later developed into the underground group Barykada Wolności. Some former members of Red Scouting, including Krystyna Lichaczewska and Józef Deptuła, who had served on the organization's Main Council, joined the ranks of the Polish Socialist Party – Freedom, Equality, Independence (PPS-WRN).

During the war, a Red Scouting cell also operated in Lviv. Established in April 1943 in cooperation with the underground PPS, it was organized by assistant scoutmaster Halina Jacuńska, known by the codename "Wanda", and Jerzy Fiederer, known as "Kuba". The cell brought together 80 boys and girls and aimed to provide assistance to children from working-class families. According to available accounts, it was probably the only such unit in occupied Poland.

After the Second World War, some former members reportedly considered reviving the organization. However, the decision was made for former Red Scouts to become involved in the activities of the Polish Scouting and Guiding Association.

== Organization ==
Members of Red Scouting from Piotrków Trybunalski during an excursion to Moszczenica, between 1930 and 1932

The basic organizational unit was the patrol (Polish: zastęp), consisting of 6–12 boys or girls and headed by a patrol leader (przodownik). Between two and five patrols formed a troop (gromada), headed by a troop commander. Each troop also had a troop council consisting of patrol leaders and other members holding organizational responsibilities, such as librarians.

Troops were generally single-sex, although mixed groups also existed. For example, only one of the 30 Warsaw troops was co-educational.

Two or more troops formed a district unit (hufiec), headed by a district council composed of troop commanders. The council elected a district commander, whose appointment required confirmation by the regional council. Two or more district units formed a region (okręg), headed by a regional council, which selected a regional commander from among its members.

In 1931, a younger branch of the organization, the Red Falcons (Polish: Czerwone Sokoły), was established for children aged 8 to 12. It had a simplified version of the organization's law, expressed in language adapted to younger children but retaining similar moral and ideological principles.

After a three-month probationary period, during which a candidate was known as a młodzik, or novice, a member took a formal Scout Promise.

A patrol of 6–12 members was led by a patrol leader, who had to be at least 13 years old and have at least one year of experience. A troop guide (przewodnik gromady), responsible for approximately five patrols, had to be at least 18 years old, with the minimum age later reduced to 16. The guide was expected to demonstrate appropriate scouting skills and ideological commitment.

Most activities took place within patrols and included games, physical exercises, workshop activities, discussions about the situation and struggle of the working class, and excursions.

A particularly important element of Red Scouting's educational method was self-government. Patrol members collectively decided on their programme of activities. During camps, patrols had considerable autonomy in making decisions, although independent swimming and excursions to nearby villages were restricted because of possible conflicts with the state police.

The troop council selected new patrol leaders, while the district council appointed new troop guides.

Unlike many other scouting organizations, Red Scouting did not have a conventional ranking system. Instead, it established requirements for admission to the Scout Promise, which were relatively accessible, and more extensive requirements for appointment as a patrol leader or troop guide. These included knowledge, practical achievements such as camping experience, ideological awareness and scouting skills.

Towards the end of the organization's existence, its leaders recognized the need to introduce a formal proficiency badge system. The existing extensive sets of requirements were considered difficult for young members to complete and potentially discouraging. However, the regulations for such a system were not completed before the outbreak of the Second World War.

The organization's emblem was a flying falcon enclosed within a circle. Ordinary members wore it against a red background, patrol leaders against a green background, troop leaders against a gold background, and district commanders against a purple background. The symbol referred to the emblem of the international socialist scouting movement, associated with the International Falcon Movement.

The male uniform consisted of a light-blue shirt with shoulder straps and two breast pockets, knee-length shorts in a colour uniform within each troop, and knee-high socks. The headgear was a maciejówka cap with a red cord and visor. A red neckerchief fastened with a ring completed the uniform.

The female uniform consisted of a similar shirt, a dark-coloured dress extending below the knees, a beret and a neckerchief.

== Law and Scout Promise ==
The socialist character of the organization was reflected in the text of the Red Scouting Promise:

I solemnly promise to work for the liberation of the working class, to observe the Scout Law, and to uphold the honour and development of Red Scouting.

The original Red Scouting Law consisted of ten principles:

1. A Red Scout is devoted to the cause of the working people.
2. They respect labour and fight for its emancipation.
3. They respect every sincere conviction, even that of an opponent.
4. They tell the truth and despise lies.
5. They are disciplined and willingly and conscientiously fulfil their duties.
6. They are always cheerful, love people and readily come to their assistance.
7. They are punctual and keep their word.
8. They despise the oppression of the weak.
9. They love nature, seek to understand it and protect it from destruction.
10. They are pure in thought, word and deed; they do not drink alcohol, smoke or gamble.

=== Revised version of the Law (1933) ===
A revised version of the Red Scouting Law was introduced in 1933:

1. A Red Scout considers themselves a member of the working class and fights for its liberation.
2. They are always faithful to their comrades.
3. They regard every working person as a friend and brother.
4. They defend the weak and are always ready to offer assistance.
5. They are courageous and never despair.
6. They are punctual, disciplined and conscientious.
7. They tell the truth, and their word can be trusted.
8. They develop their physical endurance and take care of their bodies.
9. They love and protect nature.
10. They are pure in thought, word and deed. They do not smoke and oppose alcohol and gambling.

== Leadership ==
From July 1929, Red Scouting was directed by the Scouting Department (Referat Harcerski) of the Central Committee of OM TUR.

Its members included:

- Stanisław Dubois – chairman
- Stanisław Wojciech Garlicki – deputy chairman
- Eugenia Pragierowa – member
- Henryk Jędrzejewski – member
- Józef Deptuła – member

Kazimierz Wojciechowski and Natalia Kaniówna were subsequently added to the department. It directed Red Scouting until May 1931.

After the organization became autonomous in May 1931, it was headed by a Main Council consisting of 15 representatives of local district units, as well as two representatives each from the Main Board of the Workers' University Society and OM TUR.

The Main Council elected an executive committee from among its members.

The executive committee in 1931 included:

- Stanisław Dubois – chairman
- Kazimierz Wojciechowski – deputy chairman
- Krystyna Lichaczewska – secretary
- Józef Deptuła
- Edward Lenarczyk (Warsaw)
- Eugeniusz Konopacki (Łowicz)
- Władysław Żelazko (Piotrków Trybunalski; according to other sources, Boguszówna)
- Kazimiera Kurnikowska (Sosnowiec)
- Kazimierz Szymański (Sosnowiec)
- Feliks Gross (Kraków)
- Osiek (Kraków)
- Dusza (Toruń)

== Bibliography ==
- Leksykon harcerstwa, edited by Olgierd Fietkiewicz, Warsaw: Młodzieżowa Agencja Wydawnicza, 1988, ISBN 83-203-1779-7.
- Kazimierz Wojciechowski (ed.), W gromadach czerwonego harcerstwa TUR, Warsaw: Młodzieżowa Agencja Wydawnicza, 1987, ISBN 83-203-2474-2.
- Dorota Protalińska, Czerwone Harcerstwo TUR 1926–1939: Założenia wychowawcze i działalność, Warsaw: Państwowe Zakłady Wydawnictw Szkolnych, 1965.
- Jerzy Węgierski, W lwowskiej Armii Krajowej, Warsaw: IW PAX, 1989, ISBN 83-211-1044-4.
- Kazimierz Wojciechowski, "Kilka myśli o Czerwonym Harcerstwie TUR", in PPS. Wspomnienia z lat 1918–1939, vol. 2, Warsaw, 1987.
