= Workers' University Society =

- Towarzystwo Uniwersytetu Robotniczego
- Logo of the Workers' University Society
- Formation: 1923 (original organization); 2001 (reactivation)
- Dissolved: 21 October 2026
- Type: Socialist educational and cultural organization
- Headquarters: Poland
- Region served: Poland and France
- Affiliations: Polish Socialist Party

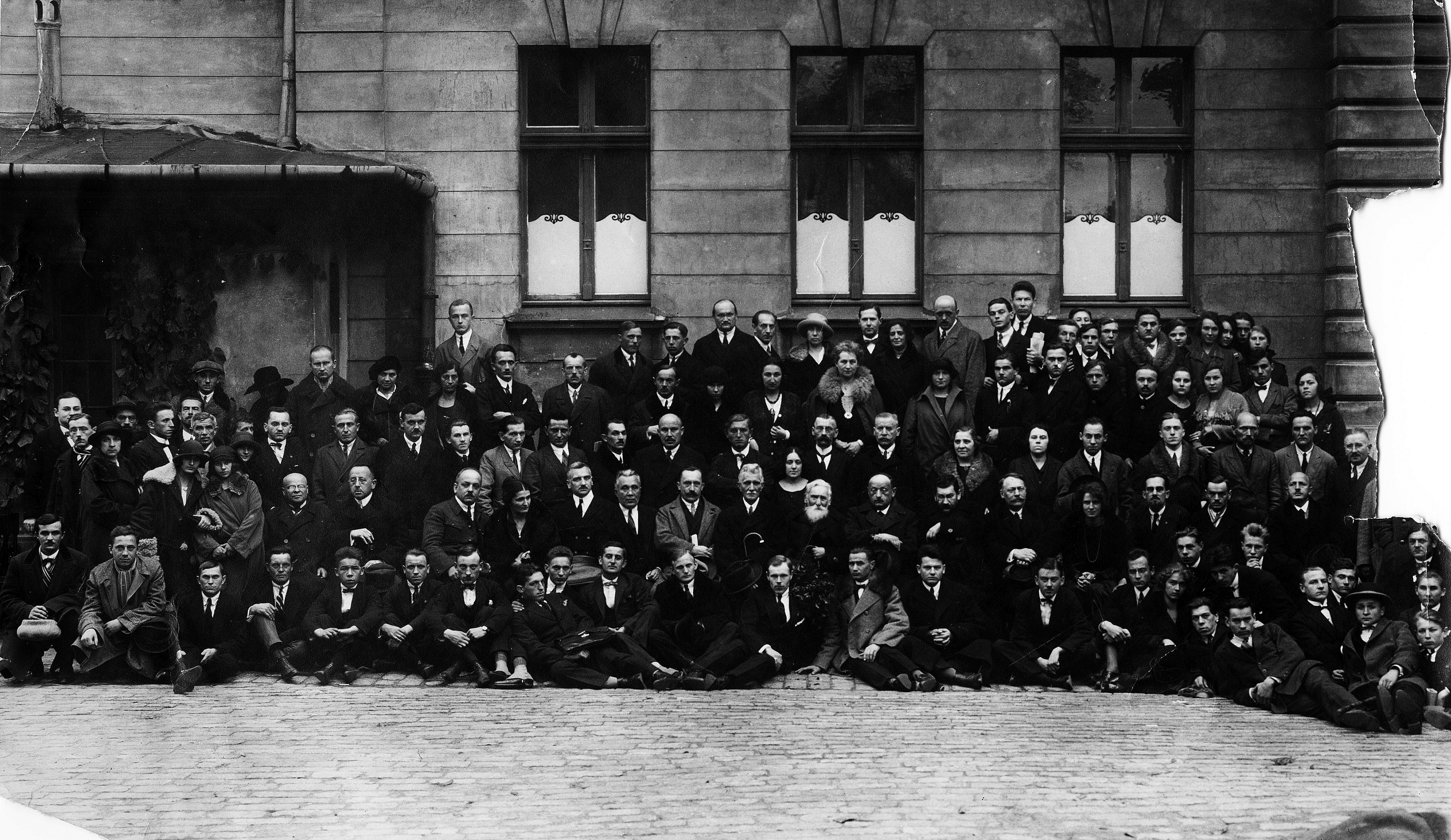
Participants in the first congress of the Workers' University Society. Among those pictured are Bolesław Limanowski, Ignacy Daszyński, Kazimierz Czapiński, Feliks Perl and Stanisław Posner

Members of the TUR workers' theatre after a performance of Królowa przedmieścia during the interwar period

The Workers' University Society (Polish: Towarzystwo Uniwersytetu Robotniczego, TUR) was a socialist educational and cultural organization active in Poland and among the Polish diaspora in France. It operated from 1923 to 1948 and was re-established in 2001. The reactivated organization was dissolved on 21 October 2026.

== History ==
=== Origins and objectives ===
The Workers' University Society was established on the initiative of the Polish Socialist Party (PPS), which sought to promote education and culture among industrial workers. The decision to establish the organization was adopted by the PPS Supreme Council on 21 December 1922, following a proposal by Ignacy Daszyński. The name referred to the tradition of people's universities, which had developed in Europe as a form of adult education outside the conventional academic system.

The first organizational meeting of TUR took place on 21 January 1923, under the chairmanship of Ignacy Daszyński, who became chairman of its Main Board. Senator Stefan Kopciński was appointed vice-chairman and also served as secretary-general. Tadeusz Hołówko became secretary, while member of parliament Zygmunt Kazimierz Piotrowski was appointed treasurer. Other members of the Main Board included Tadeusz Szpotański, Iza Zielińska, Andrzej Strug, Ksawery Prauss, Stanisław Posner, Kazimierz Czapiński, Tadeusz Reger, Zygmunt Klemensiewicz, Robert Froehlich, Maria Kelles-Krauz and Józef Dziuba.

The Society combined the dissemination of knowledge with social and political education based on socialist principles. Its educational activities were not restricted to people directly affiliated with the PPS; they also addressed broader working-class and trade union communities.

=== Activities during the interwar period ===
During its first years, TUR developed a network of local branches and organized lectures, educational courses and publishing activities. In 1923, the organization had 40 branches and more than 4,000 members. Its activities included establishing permanent and mobile libraries, self-education groups, musical and theatrical ensembles, choirs, as well as educational and sightseeing excursions. It also organized regular lectures on various subjects, supplementary educational courses and classes that enabled participants to complete primary and secondary education.

The Society also supported the development of workers' sport. In Łódź, for example, activists associated with the TUR Workers' Sports Club participated in the activities of the local workers' sports movement, which established the Łódź District Workers' Sports Committee in January 1927.

TUR's educational activities combined the dissemination of general knowledge with social and political education based on socialist principles. Although the subjects of lectures and publications frequently concerned political and economic issues, the organization also sought to broaden workers' general knowledge and cultural interests. The scale of its lecture programme was considerable: in 1936, the Society organized 299 lectures attended by more than 135,000 people in total.

The promotion of theatrical culture was another important aspect of the Society's activities. In Warsaw, TUR co-organized the Ateneum Theatre together with the Railway Workers' Trade Union. The theatre was based in a building on Czerwonego Krzyża Street. Local branches also organized amateur theatrical performances and maintained choirs and musical ensembles. Their cultural activities were supplemented by educational and sightseeing excursions.

The organization also operated among the Polish diaspora in France. The Workers' University Society of the Polish Emigration (Polish: Towarzystwo Uniwersytetu Robotniczego Wychodźstwa Polskiego) was established in 1928. In 1931, it had 47 branches in ten French departments. It maintained libraries and brought together 25 amateur theatre groups, eight choirs, ten orchestras and five district self-education groups. Local branches organized educational lectures at least once a month, sometimes accompanied by screenings of educational films.

One example of the Society's local activities was Częstochowa, where its first branch was established on 17 February 1924. It organized lectures, talks, excursions, social gatherings and theatrical performances. A district board was established in 1935, bringing together several local branches. In 1938, seven branches maintained libraries. During the same year, the organization held 213 excursions and lectures and organized 60 social gatherings and theatrical performances. The district organization then had 562 members.

The training of educational personnel was also an important part of TUR's work. The organization conducted instructor-training courses and established social and educational schools to prepare activists for work in its local branches. Training sessions were held, among other places, in Sosnowiec, Helenowo near Warsaw and Piotrków Trybunalski. They generally lasted several weeks and covered legal issues, the fundamentals of socialism, social policy, the organization of community work and methods of conducting cultural and educational activities.

In 1935, the Kraków branch of TUR, named after Adam Mickiewicz, organized a survey entitled Ankieta o Kulturze Proletariatu i Samokształceniu (Survey on Proletarian Culture and Self-Education). The initiative was carried out in cooperation with Jagiellonian University professor Zygmunt Mysłakowski and sociologist Feliks Gross. Its purpose was to investigate the interests, living conditions and methods of acquiring knowledge among industrial workers and white-collar employees. Participants were encouraged to describe their personal experiences of self-education, reading and participation in educational activities. The results were published in 1938 in a book entitled Robotnicy piszą. Pamiętniki robotników. Studium wstępne (Workers Write: Workers' Memoirs. A Preliminary Study), edited by Mysłakowski and Gross.

Working-class youth played an important role in the Society's activities. In 1926, the Workers' Youth Organization of the Workers' University Society (Polish: Organizacja Młodzieży Towarzystwa Uniwersytetu Robotniczego, OM TUR) was established within TUR. It was headed by Stanisław Dubois. Previously, youth groups had operated within the Society's local branches, and the TUR leadership had established a Central Youth Department. OM TUR developed educational, cultural, sporting and political activities, preparing young people for participation in public life. In 1936, its representatives issued the Declaration of the Rights of the Young Generation (Polish: Deklaracja praw młodego pokolenia). The activities of the working-class youth movement were also associated with the TUR Red Scouting organization (Polish: Czerwone Harcerstwo Towarzystwa Uniwersytetu Robotniczego) and various sporting initiatives.

The development of TUR's activities was also affected by the country's economic and political situation. The years 1930–1934 were particularly difficult, as the Great Depression and rising unemployment restricted opportunities for social activity among working-class youth. The economic recovery after 1935 created more favourable conditions for the development of the organization's educational and cultural activities.

=== Reconstruction and activities after the Second World War ===
The organization was re-established in 1944 by the Lublin faction of the Polish Socialist Party. Between 1945 and 1949, its chairman was Włodzimierz Sokorski, while Kazimierz Wojciechowski served as secretary-general.

In 1948, TUR had 197 branches, including regional and county-level branches. It operated two professional theatres, the Higher School of Social Sciences in Kraków, and 281 educational institutions, including 18 schools of social work and 68 general universities. Its activities also included correspondence courses, extensive self-education advisory services and a network of mobile libraries. Between 1945 and 1948, TUR published the monthly magazine Wiedza i Życie.

On 10 December 1948, TUR merged with the Society of People's Universities (Polish: Towarzystwo Uniwersytetów Ludowych, TUL), forming the Society of Workers' and People's Universities (Polish: Towarzystwo Uniwersytetów Robotniczych i Ludowych, TURiL). TURiL was dissolved on 17 April 1950. It was replaced by the Society for the Promotion of Education (Polish: Towarzystwo Wiedzy Powszechnej). Several of its departments were incorporated into the cultural and educational activities of the Central Commission of Trade Unions (KCZZ).

TUR also continued to operate in exile during the 1950s as part of the Polish Socialist Party in exile. In 1956, attempts were made to re-establish the organization in Poland.

In 2001, TUR was reactivated, with its headquarters in Poznań. Jan Turski served as chairman of its Main Board.

A separately registered regional organization, the Lidia and Adam Ciołkosz Regional Board in Kraków (Polish: Zarząd Wojewódzki im. Lidii i Adama Ciołkoszów w Krakowie), was also active. It was chaired by Dr Andrzej Gajzler. The organization operated the TUR Post-Secondary Vocational School named after Adam and Lidia Ciołkosz in Kraków and the TUR Continuing Education Centre.

The reactivated organization was dissolved on 21 October 2026.

== Commemoration ==
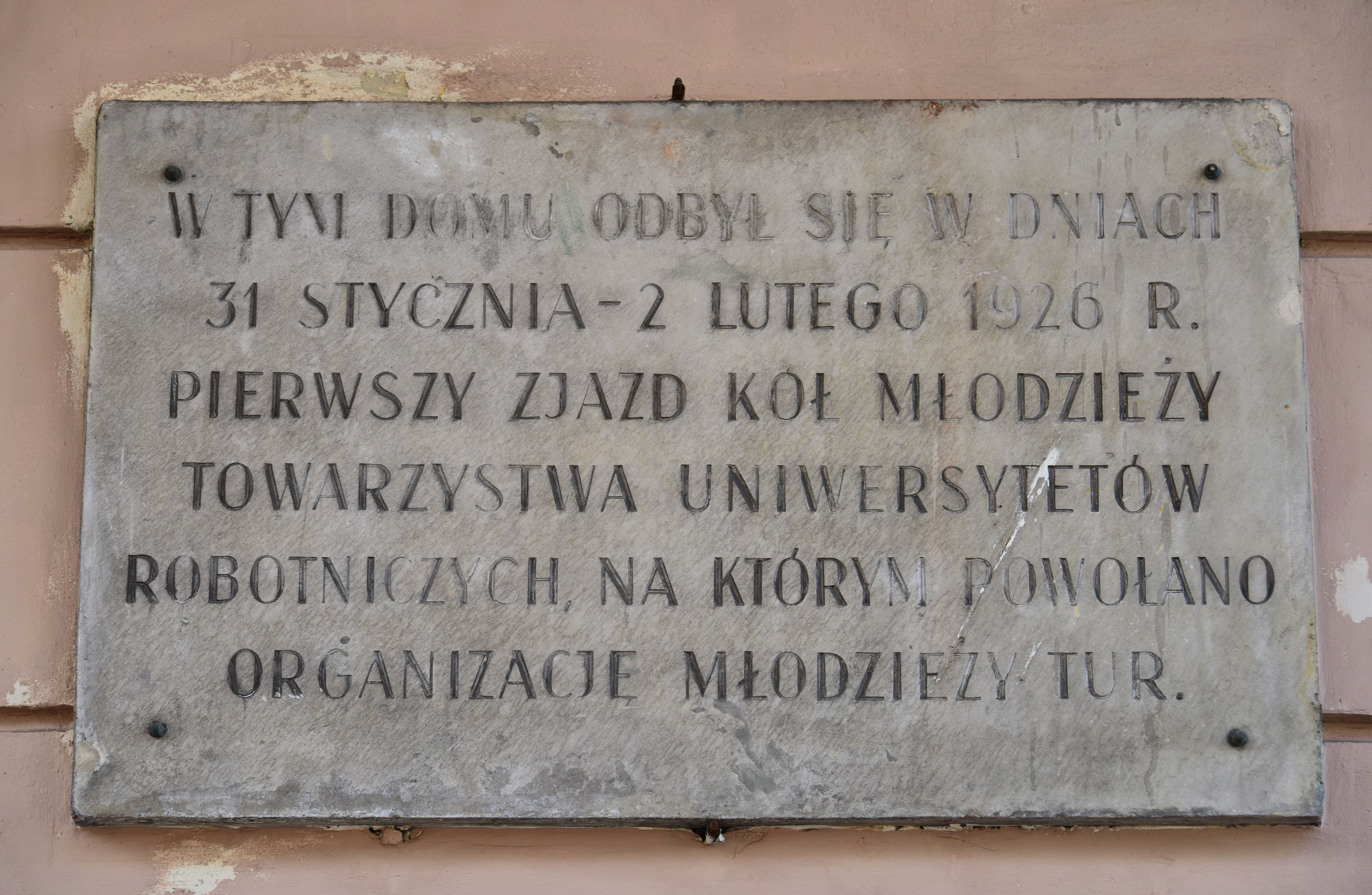
Plaque commemorating the First Congress of TUR Youth Groups, at which the Workers' Youth Organization was established. The plaque is located at 30 Jerusalem Avenue in Warsaw.

- A plaque commemorating the First Congress of TUR Youth Groups, at which the Workers' Youth Organization (OM TUR) was established, was installed on a building at 30 Jerusalem Avenue in Warsaw in the 1950s.
