= Stańczyk (disambiguation) =

Stańczyk was a famous court jester in Polish history.

Stańczyk may also refer to:

- Stańczyk (painting), an 1862 painting by Jan Matejko
- Jan Stańczyk (1886–1953), Polish politician
- Janusz Stańczyk (born 1955), Polish diplomat
- Marcin Stańczyk (born 1977), Polish composer, lawyer, pedagogue and music theorist
- Piotr Stanczyk (born 1979), Canadian-Polish ballet dancer, teacher and assistant choreographer
- Przemysław Stańczyk (born 1985), Polish swimmer
- Stanley Stanczyk (1925–1997), American weightlifter
- Tomasz Stańczyk (born 1978), Polish sailor
- Xawery Stańczyk (born 1985), Polish poet, sociologist, essayist

== See also ==
- Stanczak
