= Justyna Budzińska-Tylicka =

Polish physician and women's rights advocate

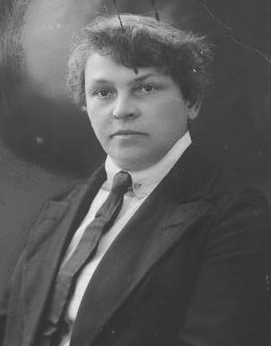
- Born: Justyna Budzińska; 12 September 1867; Suwałki, Vistula Land, Russian Empire
- Died: 8 April 1936 (aged 68); Warsaw, Second Polish Republic
- Occupations: physician, politician
- Years active: 1898–1936

Justyna Budzińska-Tylicka (12 September 1867 – 8 April 1936) was a Polish physician and women's rights advocate, active in the interwar era. After earning a medical degree and practicing in Paris for seven years, she returned to Poland and practiced medicine in Warsaw. Active in the women's movement and the push for expansion of women's rights, she later served on the Warsaw City Council and was involved in social endeavors to improve both health and women's political involvement. One such initiative was opening the first birth control clinic in Poland and another was the founding of the Association of Polish Female Physicians. She participated in international feminist conventions and Congresses, including serving as president of the international Little Entente of Women.

== Early life ==
Justyna Budzińska was born on 12 September 1867 in Suwałki which at the time was part of the Russian Empire, located in the (Polish: Kraj Nadwiślański), to Jadwiga and Alfons Budziński. Her father was a veterinarian who participated in the January Uprising against Russian occupation of Poland and was subsequently deported to Siberia where he died. Forced to earn her own living from an early age, Budzińska was sent to Warsaw and attended a girls' boarding school, completing her high school education after attending as a part-time student.

== Career ==
Upon receiving her degree, Budzińska began working as a governess on a private estate in Ukraine and ran a secret school to teach village children. Saving her money, by 1892 she had earned enough to continue her studies in Paris and moved there to enroll in medical school. Like other students, she participated in a wide variety of social programs including attending lectures, distributing publications from the Polish underground, helping Polish émigrés in France, and joining the Foreign Association of Polish Socialists. She did not long remain a part of the socialist movement officially, but was an adherent to their ideology for the majority of her life. Around 1894, Budzińska married Stanisław Tylicki and subsequently the couple had two children, Stanisław and Wanda.

Graduating with her medical degree in 1898, Budzińska-Tylicka set up a medical practice in the village of Ebripill near Meaux. Her success allowed her to purchase the practice of a deceased physician and maintain the clients for seven years. In 1905, the couple decided to return with their family to Poland, but were barred from living anywhere except in the Grand Duchy of Cracow because of their former ties with the socialist movement. Budzińska-Tylicka became involved in various associations aimed at social improvement, including the Society for Child Welfare, Society for Elementary Schools and women's rights issues along with Maria Turzyma-Wiśniewska. Within two years, the family moved to Warsaw, where she found work at the Hospital of the Holy Spirit, once her foreign degree had been accepted by Russian authorities.

Budzińska-Tylicka worked in the temperance movement and was active in both hygiene and tuberculosis programs. She was one of the first women physicians to work in girl's education. Between 1910 and 1912, she participated in hygiene classes at the Popielewska- Roszkowska Female Gymnasium. In addition to her hospital work and private practice, Budzińska-Tylicka wrote pamphlets on hygiene and pedagogy, women's health, and legal protections for women. She supported women's equality and was a member of the Union for the Equal Rights of Polish Women (Polish: Związek Równouprawnienia Kobiet Polskich), which had been founded by Paulina Kuczalska-Reinschmit.

In 1916, Budzińska-Tylicka left Holy Spirit and helped establish a field hospital working with soldiers during World War I and continued her private practice, which mostly focused on respiratory ailments. She lost her son who was an officer during the conflict, which was very difficult for her, as her marriage was not a happy one and she was not close to her daughter, turning instead to social issues. Polish women gained the right to vote in 1918 and soon after the war ended Budzińska-Tylicka co-founded, along with Teodora Męczkowska and Zofia Daszyńska-Golińska, the Progressive Women’s Political Club (Polish: Klub Polityczny Kobiet Postępowych (KPKP)) with the goal of educating women in exercising their voting rights. She also served as a vice president of the Polish branch of the International Socialist Women's Committee. As part of her activities, she joined the Women's International League for Peace and Freedom (WILPF), attended the International Woman Suffrage Alliance (IWSA) in Geneva and three years later, in 1923 attended the IWSA Rome Conference, where she joined with Alexandrina Cantacuzino and others in forming the Little Entente of Women (LEW).

In 1919, Budzińska-Tylicka joined the Polish Society for Social Medicine. From 1919 through 1934, she served as a member of Warsaw City Council, initially as a representative of the KPKP and after 1922 as a representative of the Polish Socialist Party. In 1925–1926, she founded the Association of Polish Female Physicians Polish: Zrzeszenie Lekarek Polskich) and became its vice president. In 1927, Budzińska-Tylicka was instrumental in establishing courses to train nurses to work in child care centers for businesses and factories and that same year, she became the president of the LEW. Between 1929 and 1931, she worked on the board of the Chamber of Medicine to promote maternal protections and fight against alcoholism and poverty. She advocated for the legalization of abortion and disapproved of punishing women who had terminated their pregnancies. On 25 October 1931, Budzińska-Tylicka opened the first birth control center in Poland and became the director of the facility. Later that same year, she was arrested for participating in a political demonstration, but was released after filing an appeal. In 1935, she was involved in agitating for the closure of Bereza Kartuska prison, which housed political prisoners and granting them amnesty. That same year, she became the president of the Polish Academy of Sciences.

== Death and legacy ==
Budzińska-Tylicka died unexpectedly from a cerebral hemorrhage on 8 April 1936. Her writings on nutrition and hygiene were widely influential in Poland, as she advocated that a healthy diet, with less meat and more vegetables improved overall health. She also advocated that by improving the health of expectant mothers and the sanitary conditions of their surroundings the mortality of children would improve.
