= Tadeusz Szpotański =

Polish politician and schoolteacher (1883–1944)

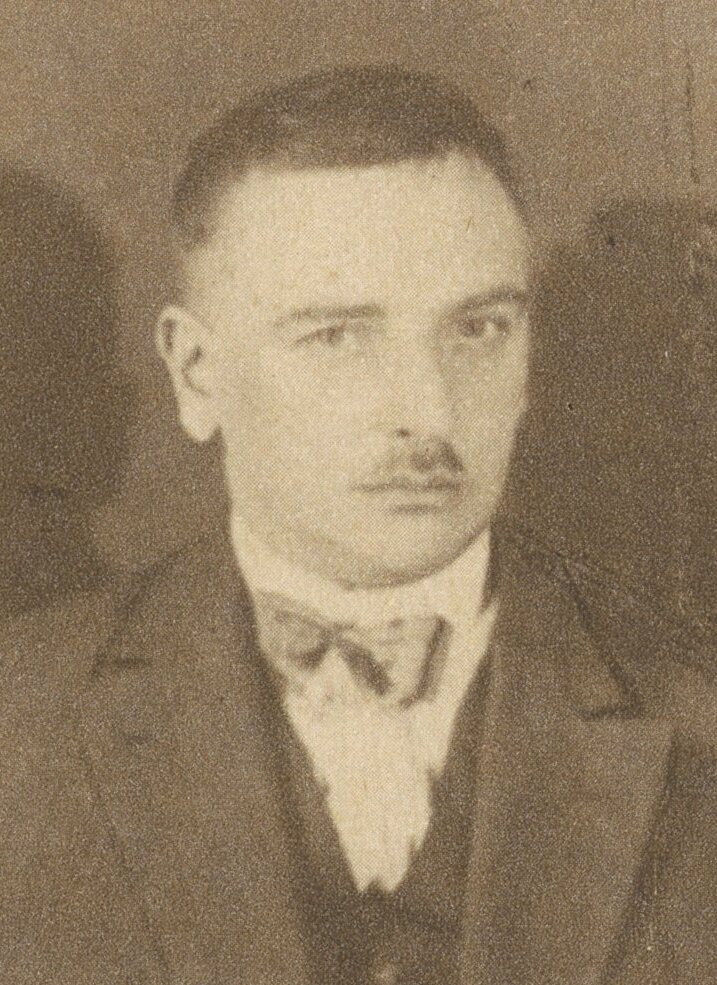
- Szpotański in 1929.

Deputy mayor of Warsaw
- In office July 1927 – 7 September 1934 Serving with Konrad Ilski and Stefan Rottermund
- Preceded by: Mieczysław Jankowski
- Succeeded by: Józef Ołpiński; Jan Pohoski

Mayor of Warsaw
- Acting
- In office 8 February 1934 – 3 March 1934
- Preceded by: Zygmunt Słomiński
- Succeeded by: Marian Zyndram-Kościałkowski

Member of the Warsaw City Council
- In office 1919–1934

Personal details
- Born: 18 December 1883 Suchcice, Kingdom of Poland, Russian Empire (now part of Poland)
- Died: 27 February 1944 (aged 60) Warsaw, General Governorate for the Occupied Polish Territories (now part of Poland)
- Resting place: Powązki Cemetery, Poland
- Party: Polish Socialist Party (1904–1906; 1909–1928); Revolutionary Faction of the Polish Socialist Party (1906–1909); Former Revolutionary Faction of the Polish Socialist Party (1928–1939)
- Occupation: Politician, schoolteacher
- Nickname: Tomasz Sawicki

Military service
- Allegiance: Polish government-in-exile
- Branch/service: Union of Armed Struggle
- Years of service: 1939–1941
- Battles/wars: Second World War

Tadeusz Szpotański (Polish: [taˈdɛ.uʂ ʂpɔˈtaɲ.ski]; 18 December 1883 – 27 February 1944) was a Polish politician and schoolteacher. He was a deputy mayor of the city of Warsaw, Poland from July 1927 to 7 September 1934. From 8 February to 15 February 1934, Szpotański served as the acting mayor of Warsaw. From 1919 to 1934, he was a member of the Warsaw City Council. From 1939 to 1941, Szpotański fought in the Union of Armed Struggle, an armed resistance group active in Poland under German occupation, during the Second World War. He operated under the cryptonym Tomasz Sawicki (Polish: [ˈtɔ.maʂ saˈvit͡s.ki]). Szpotański belonged to the Polish Socialist Party, the Revolutionary Faction of the Polish Socialist Party, and the Former Revolutionary Faction of the Polish Socialist Party.

== Biography ==
Tadeusz Szpotański was born on 18 December 1883 in the village of Suchcice, then located in the Piotrków Governorate in the Kingdom of Poland, a part of the Russian Empire, and now located within the Łódź Voivodeship, Poland. He was a son of Maria Szpotańska (née Podczaska) and Teofil Szpotański. His father was an insurgent in the January Uprising. Szpotański was also a brother of writer and diplomant Stanisław Szpotański.

Szpotański worked as a schoolteacher. He published numerous articles and research papiers, regarding politics, society, and local government. In 1923, Szpotański was one of the co-founders of the Workers' University Society. In 1904, Szpotański joined the Polish Socialist Party. In 1906, following a split, Szpotański joined the Revolutionary Faction of the Polish Socialist Party, until the re-mering of the party in 1909. In 1928, following another slip, he joined into the Former Revolutionary Faction of the Polish Socialist Party. Szpotański was a member of the Warsaw Central National Committee from February 1916 to May 1917, and the Democratic Parties' Liaison Commission from June 1917 to November 1918, two cross-party left-wing political organisations active in the General Governorate of Warsaw during the First World War. Szpotański was also a member of the Union of Polish Independence Youth Associations.

Szpotański was a member of the Warsaw City Council from 1919 to 1934. He was appointed as a deputy mayor of Warsaw in July 1927, serving under Zygmunt Słomiński, together with Konrad Ilski and Stefan Rottermund. Following Słomiński taking a leave of absence on 8 February 1934, and later resigning from the office on 15 February, Szpotański served as the acting mayor of Warsaw until the appointment of Marian Zyndram-Kościałkowski into the position on 3 March 1934. Szpotański continued to serve as a deputy mayor until 7 September 1934, when he resigned.

From 1939 to 1941, Szpotański fought in the Union of Armed Struggle, an armed resistance group active in Poland under German occupation, during the Second World War. He operated under the cryptonym Tomasz Sawicki. From 1941 to 1942, Szpotański was an inmate in the Pawiak prison, from where he escaped on 3 March 1942, together with two other inmates. He died on 27 February 1944 in Warsaw, at the age of 60. Szpotański was buried at the Powązki Cemetery in Warsaw.

== Published works ==
- Michał Czaykowski w Turcyi (1911)
- La vérité sur les légions polonaises (1915)
- Prawda o legionach polskich (1915; SSZNDP)
- W imię niepodległości (1915)
- Dzieje polityczne Polski w krótkiem streszczeniu (1922; F. Hoesick)
- Gruzja (1924; Workers' University Society)
- Kraj w którym żyjemy (1924; Workers' University Society)
- Wewnętrzne czynniki rozwoju Polski (1925; Workers' University Society)
