= Tylicki =

Tylicki (feminine: Tylicka; plural: Tyliccy) is a Polish surname. Notable people with the surname include:

- Piotr Tylicki (1543–1616), Polish nobleman and Bishop of Krakow
- Justyna Budzińska-Tylicka (1867–1936), Polish physician and feminist
- Jacek Tylicki (born 1951), Polish artist
- Frederik Tylicki (born c. 1986), German flat racing jockey
