= Iza Zielińska =

Polish anarchist activist

- Born: Izabela Gąsowska; February 27, 1863; Grodno, Northwestern Krai, Russian Empire
- Died: December 15, 1934 (aged 71); Warsaw, Warsaw Voivodeship, Second Polish Republic
- Resting place: Powązki Cemetery
- Education: Flying University
- Alma mater: Collège de France; Sorbonne University
- Organizations: Freemasons; Folk high school
- Notable work: Manuel de la langue polonaise; Podręcznik do nauki języka francuskiego
- Political party: Polish Socialist Party
- Movement: Anarchism
- Spouse: Józef Zieliński
- Children: 2

Iza Zielińska (27 February 1863 – 15 December 1934) was a Polish anarchist, social activist and educationalist. She was a lifelong campaigner for women's rights and a staunch critic of bourgeois feminism.

== Biography ==
=== Early life ===
Little is known about Zielińska's formative years. She was born into a szlachta family in Grodno, then part of the Russian Empire, at a young age her parents separated and her mother took her to live in the city of Vilna. As a young student she attended the Flying University in Warsaw, where she studied the works of the English philosophers John William Draper and Herbert Spencer, and became influenced by Positivist ideas. After graduating from the Flying University she returned to Vilna where she set up her own underground educational club.

=== Exile ===
Zielińska married her cousin Józef Zieliński in Grodno, but in 1888 the couple emigrated to France with their young son after Józef was barred from finishing his doctorate at the University of Warsaw due to his political activities. In Paris Zielińska began working as a nurse, as well as enrolling at the Collège de France and Sorbonne University. With her household quickly becoming a focal point of émigré life in Paris, Zielińska entertained various exiled Poles including the anarchist philosopher Edward Abramowski, Marxist philosopher Kazimierz Kelles-Krauz, the Marxist sociologist Ludwik Krzywicki, socialist Bolesław Limanowski, editor Jan Lorentowicz, the novelist Bolesław Prus, writer Wacław Sieroszewski, and the family of Oktawia and Stefan Żeromski among many others. Zielińska also sheltered Maria Jankowska-Mendelson following the arrest of her husband Stanisław, and hosted the couple Leon Wasilewski and Wanda Zieleniewska. With the encouragement of Kelles-Krauz, despite her anarchist beliefs, Zielińska eventually became a member of the Paris section of the Polish Socialist Party (PPS). Due to her interest in ideas of freethought she also became a Freemason whilst in Paris. In 1907 Zielińska represented Poland at the International Anarchist Congress of Amsterdam.

Although Zielińska integrated herself into social and political life in France, many other members of the Polish émigré community in Paris found themselves isolated. Zielińska sought to remove some of the cultural and linguistic barriers by producing language books for her fellow expatriates. While similar publications sometimes contained antisemitic stereotypes, Zielińska eschewed such racist tropes to focus on Polish history, culinary heritage, industry, and geography.

=== Return to Poland ===
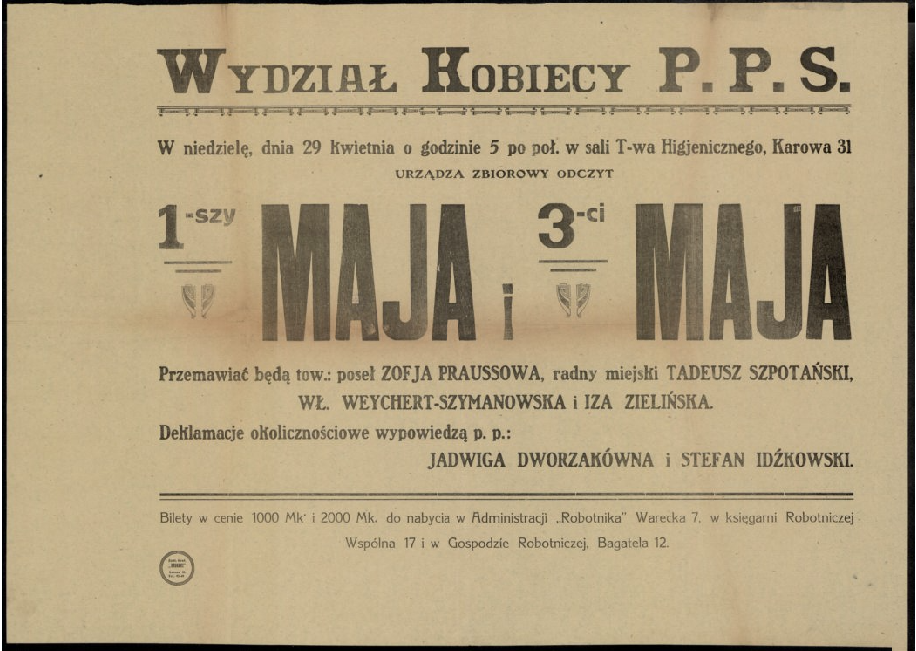
A flyer advertising a collective reading organised by the women's section of the PPS. Speakers listed include Zielińska and Zofia Praussowa.

With her husband accompanying her, Zielińska returned to Poland in 1920 to settle in Warsaw. The following year she founded the League for the Defence of Human and Citizen Rights (Liga Obrony Praw Człowieka i Obywatela), alongside Teodora Męczkowska among others, which was to become an important antifascist campaigning organisation in the 1930s. She also became evermore active within the PPS agitating for women's rights. A 1928 PPS pamphlet listed Zielińska as one of the main organisers of the party's Women's Department.

On 14 September 1930 Zielińska attended a demonstration on Ujazdów Avenue that had been called by Centrolew in opposition to the Sanation regime. After the protest developed into a riot, Zielińska received a gunshot wound to the face in the mêlée. The following month she stood in the elections as a Centrolew candidate for the Warsaw district, and was duly elected to the Senate.

=== Death ===
Despite undergoing emergency surgery Zielińska died of neutropenic enterocolitis on the 15 December 1934.

== Legacy ==
Following her death a street in the town of Żyrardów was named Izy Zielińskiej In her honour.
