= Oryol Prison =

Prison in Oryol, Russia

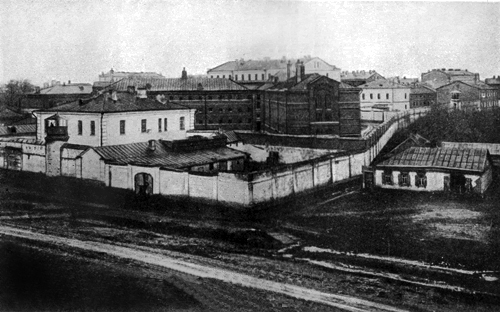
- Oryol Prison
- Interactive map of Oryol Prison
- Location: 10 Krasnoarmeyskaya str. Oryol; 52.979294°N 36.065324°E
- Opened: 1840
- Managed by: Russia

The Oryol Prison has been a prison in Oryol since the 19th century. It was a notable place of incarceration for political prisoners and war prisoners of the Second World War.

The prison building, built in 1840, is one of the oldest buildings in the city of Oryol.

In 1941, the Oryol isolation prison contained some five thousand political prisoners. On 11 September 1941, just weeks before the occupation by German troops, 157 political prisoners incarcerated here were executed just outside Oryol, by personal order of Joseph Stalin, in the Medvedev Forest massacre. During the occupation by Nazi Germany (from 7 October 1941 to 5 August 1943), Oryol Prison became a slave labour concentration camp.

After the Second World War, the Soviet authorities used it as a concentration camp for prisoners of war, among them being Dietrich von Saucken. Prisoners of war (from Germany, Hungary, and Romania) were exterminated by starvation, shooting, exposure, and poisoning. A former prisoner, Latkovska-Wojtuskiewicz, described the scene at Easter in 1951 as "a veritable hell: the room was full of people, half-naked women languished and we, the new arrivals, wallowed on filthy straw, from which rose a stinking dust which choked one's breath. We were so hoarse we could neither breathe nor speak."

At present, in the buildings of the former prison there is an investigatory isolation ward No. 1 (Russian: СИЗО-57/1) of the Penitentiary Service under the Ministry of Justice of the Russian Federation and a prison hospital for tuberculosis patients.

== Notable inmates ==
- Aleksander Prystor, politician
- Felix Dzerzhinsky, revolutionary and politician
- Olga Kameneva, revolutionary and politician
- Michael Kitzelmann, lieutenant
- Grigory Kotovsky, military officer
- Jan Kwapiński, activist and politician
- Anatoly Nagiyev, serial killer, mass murderer and rapist
- Dmitry Pletnyov, doctor, medical scientist, publicist
- Christian Rakovsky, revolutionary, politician, diplomat and statesman
- Maria Spiridonova, revolutionary
- Dietrich von Saucken, Nazi general
- Varvara Yakovleva, revolutionary and politician
- Aron Baron, revolutionary
- Dennis Christensen 2017–present

== Bibliography ==
- Гернет М. Н., История царской тюрьмы, 3 изд., т. 15, М., 1960-63 г.
- Дворянов В. Н., В сибирской дальней стороне (Очерки истории царской каторги и ссылки, 60-е годы XVIII в. — 1917 г.), Минск, 1971 г.
- Максимов С. В., Сибирь и каторга, 2 изд., ч. 1-3, СПБ, 1891 г.
