= Paulina Kuczalska-Reinschmit =

Polish social reformer and feminist activist, publisher and writer

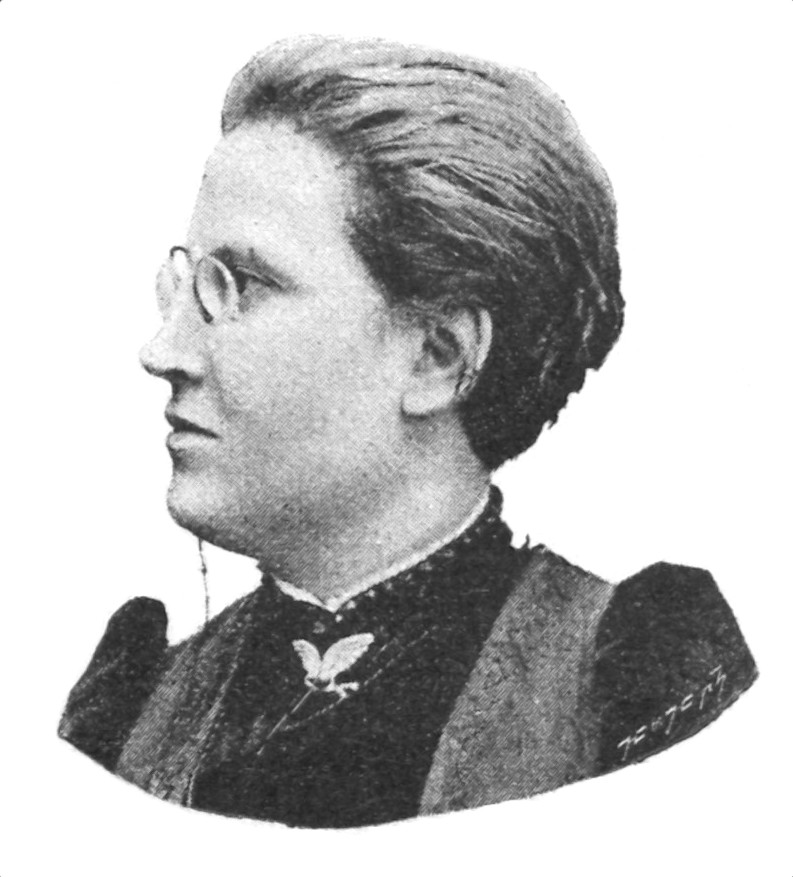
- Born: Paulina Kuczalska; 15 January 1859; Warsaw, Congress Poland
- Died: 13 September 1921 (aged 62); Warsaw, Second Polish Republic
- Known for: women's suffrage women's rights

Paulina Kuczalska-Reinschmit (born 15 January 1859 in Warsaw – died 13 September 1921 in Warsaw) was a Polish social reformer and feminist activist, publisher and writer. She campaigned for women's right to vote in Poland, which was then partitioned between Russia, Germany and Austria-Hungary.

== Life ==
Born to Ewelina Porczyńska and Leon Kuczalski in January 1859 in Warsaw, then part of the Russian Empire. She married Stanisław Reinschmit and had with him a son, Leon.

She began her publishing career in 1881, when her first text appeared in 'Echo'. She published in Tygodnik Illustrowany, Kurier Warszawski, Kurier Codzienny, Ogniwa and Nowa Gazeta.

She was one of the first to agitate for women's rights separately and over the issue of national independence. In 1894 she founded 'Delegacja Pracy Kobiet przy Towarzystwie Popierania Przemysłu i Handlu', aiming to gain women full rights of access to the crafts and to provide courses for women. In this she co-operated with Józefa Bojanowska. In 1889 she participated in the Parisian international congress of women's associations.

In 1895, she founded the periodical Ster dedicated to women's rights, published first in Lviv (1895–97) and then in Warsaw (1907–14). She organised salon meetings of like-minded women at ul. Marszałkowska, attended by Janina Baudouin de Courtenay, Justyna Budzińska-Tylicka, Kazimiera Bujwidowa, Maria Dulębianka, Maria Komornicka, Maria Konopnicka, Izabela Moszczeńska, Eliza Orzeszkowa, Józefa Sawicka and Cecylia Walewska. Piotr Chmielowski and Stefan Żeromski also contributed to this periodical.

In 1907, she founded the 'Związek Równouprawnienia Kobiet Polskich' ( Union for the Equal Rights of Polish Women), fighting for a general enfranchisement regardless of sex, national background, or religion, by means of a direct and secret ballot. To her death she remained its leader.

Cecylia Walewska, chronicler of the Polish women's rights movement, deemed Kuczalska-Reinschmit to have been the first unrelenting agitator for full and uncompromising rights for women.

== Selected publications ==
- Nasze drogi i cele. Szkic do programu działalności kobiecej, Lwów 1897.
- Stan wykształcenia kobiet w Polsce, 1902.
- Historia ruchu kobiecego, 1903.
- Młodzież żeńska i sprawa kobieca, Warszawa 1906.
- Siostry; sztuka psychologiczna, Warszawa 1908.
- Wyborcze prawa kobiet, Warszawa 1911.

== See also ==
- Feminism in Poland
- Narcyza Żmichowska
