= Jan Stańczyk =

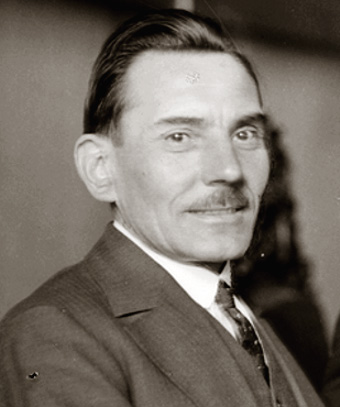
- Jan Stańczyk circa 1929
- Born: December 3, 1886
- Died: August 7, 1953 (aged 66)
- Citizenship: Polish
- Occupations: Socialist and trade union activist

Jan Stańczyk (December 3, 1886 – August 7, 1953) was a Polish socialist and trade union activist and a member of the Committee of Ministers for National Affairs of the Polish Socialist Party (PPS) from November 8, 1939, onwards.

== Career ==
=== Pre-1939 ===
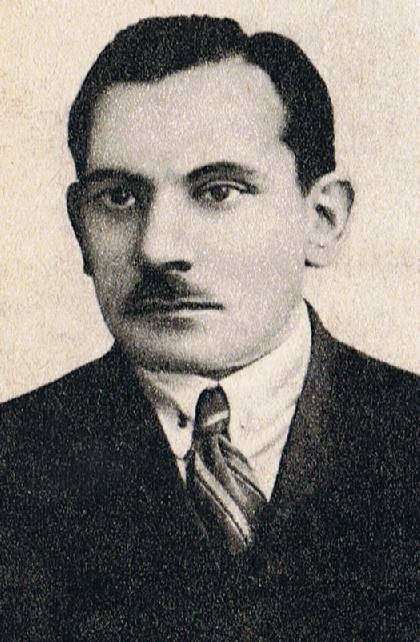
Jan Stańczyk (date uncertain)

In February 1929, Jan Stańczyk stated his support for statism: "we strive to have the State encompass the broadest possible areas of economic life." In February 1930, Jan Stańczyk was both a Member of Parliament and the leader of the Central Miners' Union.

Scholar Kamil Piskała characterized Stańczyk circa 1932 as a pragmatist toward the rise of authoritarianism and fascism in Nazi Germany and in Poland's propertied classes. "As Stańczyk argued, democracy creates conditions for the peaceful resolution of class conflict (and for gradually tipping the scales in favor of the working class) only when its general principles are accepted by both classes involved in the conflict—the bourgeoisie and the proletariat... Even the working class's utmost commitment to building a democratic order—an area in which socialists across Europe achieved impressive results—could not guarantee the system's stability." Stańczyk asked readers of Robotnik: "Deprived by brutal violence of the ability to wield the weapons that democracy affords us in the struggle for a new social order, ought we to renounce the fight and wait for our adversaries to come to their senses and begin respecting democratic principles?"

In February 1937, the last pre-war Congress of the PPS (XXIV PPS Congress) in Radom elected Stańczyk along with Alojzy Adamczyk, Adam Ciołkosz, Ludwik Grosfeld, and Herman Lieberman to a Supreme Council under a program known as the "Radom Program."

=== 1939 and after ===
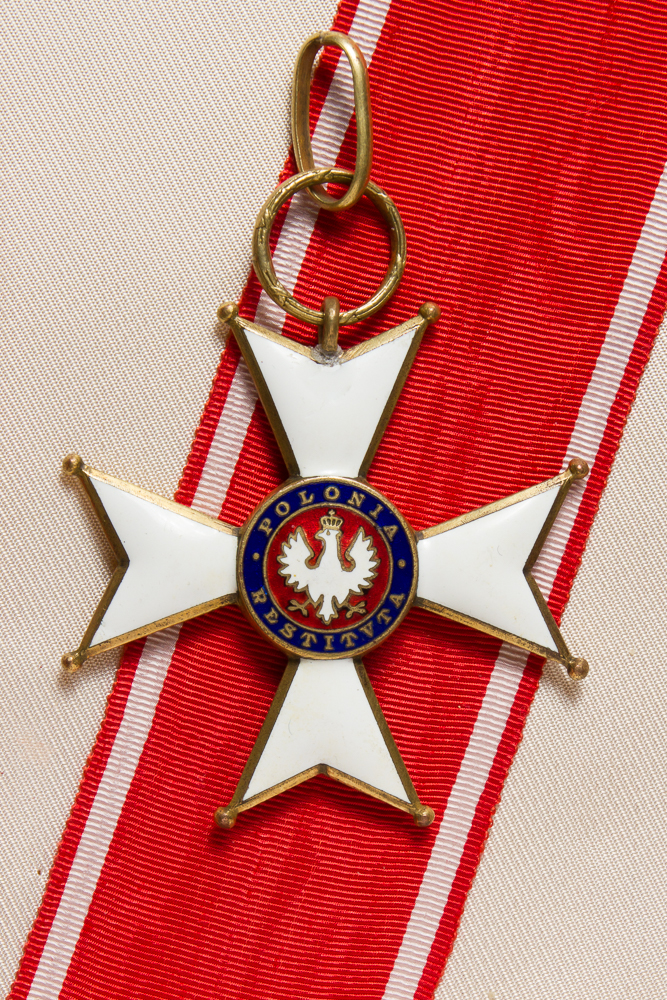
Commander's Cross of the Order of Polonia Restituta, which Stańczyk received in 1946 (here, pre-WWII version)

When World War II broke out in Poland in 1939, Stańczyk joined many other Polish socialists in exile in France.

On November 13, 1939, General Władysław Sikorski placed Stańczyk on the Committee of Ministers Delegate in support of the Polish Union of Armed Struggle (Związek Walki Zbrojnej or ZWZ).

On January 22, 1940, as scholar Anna Siwik has written, exiled PPS members formed a Central Executive Committee Abroad (CEC), which lasted until the fall of France in 1940. The CEC had Lieberman and Grosfeld as chair and vice-chair and Tomaszewski, Adamczyk, Ciołkosz and Stańczyk as members. In March 1941, CED evacuated to the United Kingdom, where it reformed as the PPS Foreign Committee (Polish abbreviation KZ PPS). After Herman Lieberman died on October 21, 1941, Ciołkosz and Stańczyk became vice-chairs and Grosfeld became secretary. The chair remain unfilled until May 1942, when Jan Kwapiński arrived from Siberia. (On January 22, 1940, the PPS established a Central Foreign Committee of the PPS Abroad, which included Stańczyk as Minister of Social Welfare.)

On July 19, 1946, Stańczyk received a Commander's Cross with Star of the Order of Polonia Restituta.

By October 2, 1946, Stanczyk was serving as director-general of the United Nations' Department of Social Affairs. On January 27, 1946, Stańczyk met former First Lady of the United States (FLOTUS) Eleanor Roosevelt at during a UN discussion on an International Bill of Rights. On September 2, 1947, Stańczyk attended the first session of the Commission on the Status of Women of United Nations Economic and Social Council (ECOSOC).

== Works ==
As Kamil Piskała noted in "Ku Rzeczypospolitej Socjalistycznej: Studium z dziejów myśli politycznej PPS (1929-1939)" (2017):

Such a radical stance was less a decisive break with the political thought of the socialist mainstream than the result of drawing ultimate conclusions from premises present in the theoretical reflections socialists had been developing since the early 1930s. This view is supported by the fact that Jan Stańczyk—a man hardly likely to be accused of open rebellion against the party leadership—reached very similar conclusions, albeit via a slightly different path. Although primarily a trade union activist rather than a publicist, Stańczyk frequently contributed to the socialist press, occasionally attempting to derive broader theoretical generalizations from the experiences gained in struggles against capitalists.

The following articles are cited by Piskała:

- J. Stańczyk, "W obliczu nędzy," _Robotnik_, 11 II 1930, s. 1 (J. Stańczyk, "Facing Destitution," Robotnik, 11 February 1930, p. 1)
- J. Stańczyk, "Zastanówcie się!," Robotnik, 15 VII 1930, s. 1 (J. Stańczyk, "Think It Over!," Robotnik, 15 July 1930, p. 1)
- J. Stańczyk, "Czy Rząd i sanacyjna większość Sejmu zajmą się wreszcie losem bezrobotnych?," Robotnik, 14 I 1931, s. 1 (J. Stańczyk, "Will the Government and the Sanacja Sejm majority finally address the plight of the unemployed?," Robotnik, 14 January 1931, p. 1)
- J. Stańczyk, "Przez likwidację ustroju kapitalistycznego i uspołecznienie środków produkcji do –likwidacji bezrobocia i kryzysu gospodarczego," Gazeta Robotnicza, 13 II 1931, s. 2 (J. Stańczyk, "Through the Abolition of the Capitalist System and the Socialization of the Means of Production to the Elimination of Unemployment and Economic Crisis," Gazeta Robotnicza, Feb. 13, 1931, p. 2)
- J. Stańczyk, "Przez likwidację ustroju kapitalistycznego i uspołecznienie środków produkcji do – likwidacji bezrobocia i kryzysu gospodarczego," Gazeta Robotnicza, 13 II 1931, s. 2 (J. Stańczyk, "Through the Abolition of the Capitalist System and the Socialization of the Means of Production to the Abolition of Unemployment and Economic Crisis," Gazeta Robotnicza, 13 February 1931, p. 2)
- J. Stańczyk, "Walka z bezrobociem," Robotnik, 13 IX 1931, s. 3 (J. Stańczyk, "The Fight Against Unemployment," Robotnik, 13 September 1931, p. 3)
- J. Stańczyk, "Z założonymi rękami…", Robotnik, 25 IX 1931, s. 1 (J. Stańczyk, "With Arms Folded…", Robotnik, September 25, 1931, p. 1)
- J. Stańczyk, "Robotnicy i konsumenci uważajcie na rezultaty!," Gazeta Robotnicza, 27 IX 1932, s. 2 (J. Stańczyk, "Workers and Consumers, Beware the Consequences!," Gazeta Robotnicza, 27 Sept. 1932, p. 2)
- J. Stańczyk, "Na progu Nowego Roku," Robotnik, 1 I 1933, s. 2 (J. Stańczyk, "On the Threshold of the New Year," Robotnik, 1 January 1933, p. 2)
- J. Stańczyk, "Błędy i wnioski," Robotnik, 17 V 1933, s. 3 (J. Stańczyk, "Errors and Conclusions," Robotnik, May 17, 1933, p. 3)
- J. Stańczyk, "Demokracja a socjalizm," Robotnik, 21 IX 1932, s. 3 (J. Stańczyk, "Democracy and Socialism," Robotnik, 21 September 1932, p. 3)
- J. Stańczyk, "Metody i środki walki klasy robotniczej," Robotnik, 21 XII 1932, s. 3 (J. Stańczyk, "Methods and Means of the Working Class Struggle," Robotnik, 21 December 1932, p. 3)
- J. Stańczyk, "W Nowym Roku – nowy zaprowadzim ład!," Robotnik, 31 XII 1933, s. 2 (J. Stańczyk, "In the New Year – We Shall Establish a New Order!," Robotnik, 31 December 1933, p. 2)
- J. Stańczyk, Dyktatura czy demokracja, „Robotnik”, 1 II 1934, s. 3 (J. Stańczyk, "Dictatorship or Democracy," Robotnik, 1 February 1934, p. 3)
- J. Stańczyk, "Rewolucje bez rewolucyjnych konsekwencji…," Robotnik, 28 VII 1934, s. 3 (J. Stańczyk, "Revolutions without Revolutionary Consequences…," Robotnik, July 28, 1934, p. 3)
- J. Stańczyk, "Proletariat polski w przededniu walki," Robotnik, 29 IX 1934, s. 1 (J. Stańczyk, "The Polish Proletariat on the Eve of Struggle," Robotnik, September 29, 1934, p. 1)
- J. Stańczyk, "Nowe ciężary. To się nie uda. To się udać nie może," Robotnik, 5 XI 1935, s. 1 (J. Stańczyk, "New Burdens. This Won’t Work. This Cannot Work," Robotnik, 5 Nov. 1935, p. 1)
- J. Stańczyk, "Sanacyjny dorobek," Robotnik, 25 I 1936, s. 1 (J. Stańczyk, "The Sanacja 's Track Record," Robotnik, 25 January 1936, p. 1)
- J. Stańczyk, "Walka o nowy ustrój – to jedyne wyjście," Robotnik, 21 III 1936, s. 1 (J. Stańczyk, "The Struggle for a New System – The Only Way Out," Robotnik, March 21, 1936, p. 1)
- J. Stańczyk, "Niskie płace, bezrobocie, drożyzna," Robotnik, 2 IV 1937, s. 3 (J. Stańczyk, "Low Wages, Unemployment, High Prices," Robotnik, April 2, 1937, p. 3)
- [J. Stańczyk], "W ramach gospodarki kapitalistycznej nie ma wyjścia z kryzysu gospodarczego," Robotnik, 20 VI 1937, s. 4 ([J. Stańczyk], "There Is No Way Out of the Economic Crisis Within the Capitalist Economy," Robotnik, June 20, 1937, p. 4)
- J. Stańczyk, "Koniunktura – jeno nie dla robotników i nie dla chłopów," Robotnik, 14 IX 1937, s. 3 (J. Stańczyk, "Economic Upturn – But Not for Workers or Peasants," Robotnik, 14 September 1937, p. 3)
- J. Stańczyk, "Walczyć trzeba z przyczynami bezrobocia, a nie tylko z jego skutkami," Robotnik, 22 XI 1938, s. 5 (J. Stańczyk, "We Must Fight the Causes of Unemployment, Not Just Its Effects," Robotnik, 22 November 1938, p. 5)
- "Wywiad specjalny z sekretarzem Centralnego Związku Górników b. posłem na Sejm Janem Stańczykiem," Dokumenty do historii polskiego ruchu robotniczego (1918-1939), pod red. L.Ziaji, Warszawa 1970, s. 283-284 ("Special interview with Jan Stańczyk, Secretary of the Central Union of Miners and former Sejm deputy," Documents on the History of the Polish Workers' Movement (1918–1939), ed. L. Ziaja, Warsaw 1970, pp. 283–284

== Bibliography ==
- Leksykon historii Polski z (Lexicon of Polish History), 1995
- Jan Walczak, Jan Stańczyk, Polish Biographical Dictionary, Vol. XLII/2, Issue 173

== External sources ==
- United Nations: "Folder S-0917-0006-02 - Principal Director [Mr. Jan Stanczyk] - GENEVA"
