= Jan Wasilkowski =

Polish jurist, judge and politician (1898–1977)

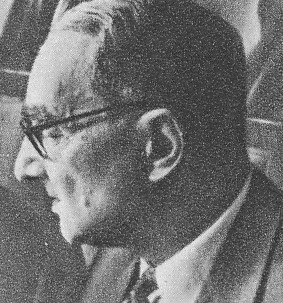
- Born: 11 May 1898; Sławków, Congress Poland
- Died: 14 July 1977 (aged 79); Warsaw, Poland
- Occupations: Jurist, judge, politician

Jan Wasilkowski (11 May 1898 – 14 July 1977) was a Polish jurist, judge and politician.

== Biography ==
He was the son of Czesław and Aleksandra. In 1918 he started studying law in Vienna and after one year he moved to Kraków. During his studies, he took part in the Polish-Bolshevik War as an artillery second lieutenant. In 1923 he obtained doctorate in law from the Jagiellonian University. In 1924 he obtained doctorate in law from the University in Nancy. In July 1924 he started work as an assistant at the University of Warsaw, working under Karol Lutostański. In 1929 he obtained habilitation. In the years 1926–1932, he was an editorial secretary of the journal Themis Polska. From 1933 he was a member of the Codification Commission.

In 1939, he was mobilized into the army and fought in the September Campaign in an artillery unit, initially on the Narew river, later in the defense of Warsaw. He was wounded, sent to Ujazdowski Hospital and taken prisoner. He was then deported to Third Reich and spent the rest of the war in POW camps. During his time in Nazi captivity in Oflag VI B, Dössel, he co-organized law courses for POWs. He came back to Poland in 1946.

From 1946 to 1948 he was a member of the Polish Socialist Party. In 1948 he joined the Polish United Worker's Party (PZPR) and remained its member until his death in 1977. He was a member of the University Committee of the Polish United Workers' Party at the University of Warsaw.

He was dean of the Law Faculty of the University of Warsaw from 1947 to 1949 and rector of the University of Warsaw from 1949 to 1952 He consistently used dialectical and historical materialism as a research method. In 1948 he became a judge of the Supreme Court. He was a member of the Central Committee of the Polish United Workers' Party from 1964 to 1969. Earlier, from 1959 to 1964 he was deputy member of the Central Committee. In 1952 he was elected a member of the Polish Academy of Sciences. From 1956 to 1967 he was the First President of the Supreme Court. In the years 1947–1956 he headed the Department of Civil Law at the University of Warsaw. From 1953 to 1956 he was director of the Institute of Legal Sciences of the Polish Academy of Sciences. He was a member of the Presidium of the Polish Academy of Sciences in 1957–1968 and secretary of the Department I of Social Sciences of the Polish Academy of Sciences in 1955–1957.

After retiring, he chaired the Codification Commission at the Ministry of Justice from 1956 to 1968. He was a co-author of the draft Civil Code of Poland, adopted in 1964. From 1961 to 1973, he was a member of Sejm. He was Chairman of the Justice Committee of Sejm. He was delegate to the 3rd and 4th Congresses of the Polish United Workers' Party.

He was married to Zofia Wasilkowska, their son was Andrzej Wasilkowski.

== Works ==
- Encyklopedia podręczna prawa prywatnego. Vol. 2–4. Co-authored with Fryderyk Zoll jr.
- Zagadnienie waloryzacji zobowiązań prywatno-prawnych w orzecznictwie francuskim. Warsaw. 1926.
- Własność i inne prawa rzeczowe: z zagadnień kodyfikacji prawa cywilnego. Warsaw. 1951.
- "Typy i formy własności w projekcie Konstytucji PRL". Państwo i Prawo (3). 1952.

== Honors and awards ==
- Officer's Cross of the Order of Polonia Restituta (3 February 1947)
- Order of the Banner of Labour, 2nd class (22 July 1951)
- Commander's Cross of the Order of Polonia Restituta (16 July 1954)
- Medal of the 10th Anniversary of People's Poland (14 January 1955)
- Commander's Cross with Star of the Order of Polonia Restituta (1964)
- Nagroda Państwowa, 2nd degree (1964)
- Order of the Builders of People's Poland (1977)
- Honorary degree of the University of Wrocław
- Honorary degree of the Charles University

== Commemoration ==
In 1979 a street in the Ursynów district in Warsaw was named after him.

== Bibliography ==
- Czachórski, Witold (1977). "Jan Wasilkowski 1898–1977". Państwo i Prawo (10): 105–108.
- Rozynek, Józef; Ziółkowski, Józef Julian (2002). Doktorzy honoris causa Uniwersytetu Wrocławskiego 1948–2002. Wrocław. pp. 38–39.
