= Kazimierz Czapiński =

Polish socialist politician and journalist (1882–1941)

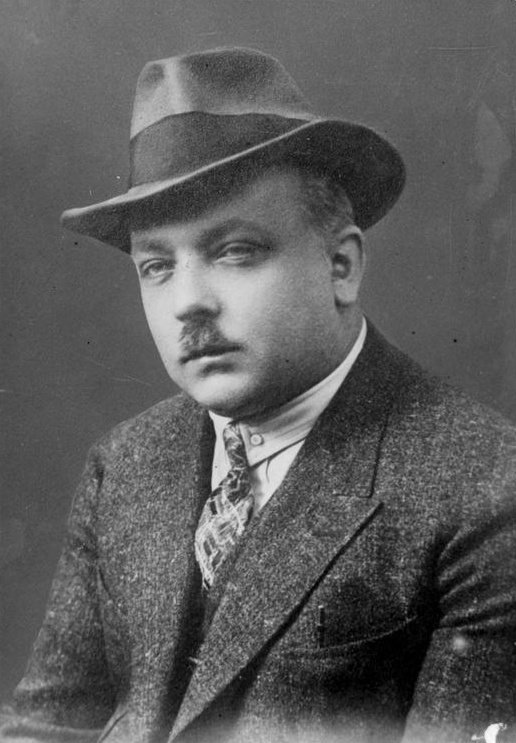

Member of the Sejm of the Republic of Poland
- In office 16 November 1930 – 10 July 1935
- Constituency: Wadowice

Personal details
- Born: 18 November 1882 Minsk, Russian Empire
- Died: 13 July 1941 (aged 58) Auschwitz concentration camp, German-occupied Poland
- Party: Polish Socialist Party
- Awards: Order of the Cross of Grunwald, 2nd Class

Kazimierz Czapiński (18 November 1882 – 13 July 1941) was a Polish socialist politician, journalist and publicist. One of the leading activists of the Polish Socialist Party (PPS) in the interwar period, he was regarded as one of the most erudite figures on the Polish left. He served as a member of the Sejm of the Republic of Poland during the Legislative Sejm and its first, second and third terms. He was also active in the socialist education movement and headed the Workers' University Society (Towarzystwo Uniwersytetu Robotniczego, TUR).

== Biography ==
=== Early life ===
Czapiński was the son of Julian and Kazimiera née Januszkiewicz. He began his socialist activities in socialist study circles at a secondary school in Minsk. Having come under threat of arrest, he took his secondary-school leaving examination as an external candidate. He subsequently began studying law at the University of Saint Petersburg.

From his first year at university, he was active in the Russian Social Democratic Labour Party (RSDLP). He was expelled from the university for his activities among workers and arrested in March 1902. After spending six months in detention, he was released for lack of evidence and sent back to Minsk, where he was placed under police surveillance for three years. He continued his activities in the RSDLP and was arrested twice more. He was also brought to trial but acquitted.

In 1904, Czapiński travelled illegally to Germany and then to Switzerland. He probably joined the Social Democracy of the Kingdom of Poland and Lithuania (SDKPiL) during this period. Following the outbreak of the Russian Revolution of 1905, he returned to Minsk. In 1906, he was arrested and sentenced to four years of exile. The sentence was commuted to an order to leave the country. He went to Lviv, where he resumed his studies and became active in the local section of the SDKPiL.

=== Activities in Galicia ===
From March 1907, Czapiński was a member of the Bureau of Foreign Sections of the SDKPiL. As its representative, he took part in the Seventh Congress of the Second International, held in Stuttgart. He began contributing to Wiedza, a legal publication of the Polish Socialist Party – Left (PPS-Lewica). With the approval of the SDKPiL leadership, he also worked with the press of the Polish Social Democratic Party of Galicia and Cieszyn Silesia (PPSD), including the newspaper Naprzód. He also became involved in the work of the Adam Mickiewicz People's University.

Because political activity was legal in Galicia, Czapiński advocated cooperation with the PPSD without abandoning the ideological programme of the SDKPiL. His position, however, was criticised, and in 1910 he was removed from the Bureau of Foreign Sections of the SDKPiL.

From 1910, he became involved in the educational movement of the PPSD. He reactivated the party school originally established by Józef Kwiatek. After the outbreak of World War I, he became editor of Naprzód.

=== Polish Socialist Party activist ===
In 1919, Czapiński was elected to the Kraków city council as a PPSD representative. In the 1919 parliamentary election, he was elected to the Legislative Sejm from the PPSD list (list number 5) in electoral district no. 38, which included Wadowice. In the Sejm, he served on the Constitutional Committee and the Education Committee. He was also secretary of the Parliamentary Union of Polish Socialists.

In the 1922 parliamentary election, he was elected from the Polish Socialist Party list (list number 2) in electoral district no. 43 (Wadowice). During the first term of the Sejm, he served on the Constitutional Committee.

Czapiński was again elected from the PPS list in Wadowice in the 1928 and 1930 parliamentary elections. During the second term of the Sejm, he served on the Budget Committee and the Foreign Affairs Committee, and was deputy chairman of the Constitutional Committee. He also served as secretary of the Parliamentary Union of Polish Socialists. During the third term, he was a member of the Budget Committee and the Constitutional Committee, and continued to serve as secretary of the Union.

He was known for his anti-clerical and anti-Bolshevik speeches, as well as his work on the Constitutional and Concordat Committees. He was one of the principal contributors to Robotnik and also served as deputy editor-in-chief of Naprzód.

Czapiński directed the educational work of the Polish Socialist Party. From 1924 to 1936, he was vice-president of the Main Board of the Workers' University Society (Towarzystwo Uniwersytetu Robotniczego, TUR), and from 1936 to 1939 he served as its president. He was continuously a member of the PPS Supreme Council from 1919 to 1939 and joined the party's Central Executive Committee in October 1921.

Czapiński was regarded as one of the best-educated activists in the PPS, and his library was noted for the breadth of its collection. He was an atheist, a philosophical rationalist and a proponent of scientism. In his book Nauczyciele (Teachers), Andrzej Nowicki, who later became president of the Association of Atheists and Freethinkers and the Polish Religious Studies Society, described Czapiński as one of his seven formative teachers.

=== World War II and occupation ===
In September 1939, Czapiński left Warsaw and returned after the city's surrender. He opposed organising an underground resistance movement, believing that the war would soon end with the victory of the French army.

From 1940, he cooperated with the group led by Adam Próchnik and with the underground socialist organisation Barykada Wolności (Barricade of Freedom), taking part in study circles. He was arrested by the Gestapo in 1941 and, on 6 February 1941, was sent to the Auschwitz concentration camp. He died there in July 1941.

In 1947, he was posthumously awarded the Order of the Cross of Grunwald, 2nd Class, following a motion by the Central Executive Committee of the Polish Socialist Party.

== Selected publications ==
- Kler a robotnicy (Ks. Zimmermann w świetle swych własnych poglądów) (The clergy and the workers: Rev. Zimmermann in the light of his own views), Kraków, 1910.
- Czego uczą jezuici (What the Jesuits teach), Kraków, 1919.
- Dokąd kler prowadzi Polskę? (Where is the clergy leading Poland?), 1921; reprinted in Wrocław, 2009.
- Bankructwo bolszewizmu (The bankruptcy of Bolshevism), Warsaw, 1921.
- Czarna ofenzywa. Drogi i cele wojującego klerykalizmu. Uchwały zjazdu katolickiego w Warszawie. Zamach klerykalny na niezależność państwa polskiego, kultury polskiej i ruchu robotniczego (The black offensive: the aims and methods of militant clericalism; resolutions of the Catholic congress in Warsaw; the clerical attack on the independence of the Polish state, Polish culture and the labour movement), Warsaw, 1922.
- Czy socjaliści mogą walczyć razem z komunistami. Kwestia Międzynarodówki i „Jednolitego frontu” proletariatu (Can socialists fight alongside communists? The question of the International and the proletarian united front), Warsaw, 1922.
- Państwo a Kościół. Konkordat Polski z Rzymem (The state and the Church: Poland's concordat with Rome), Warsaw, 1925.
- W drodze do zwycięstwa – Główne etapy myśli socjalistycznej (On the road to victory: the main stages of socialist thought), 1925.
- Socjalizm czy komunizm (Socialism or communism), Kraków, 1927.
- Co dał komunizm robotnikom, chłopom i krajowi (What communism has given to workers, peasants and the country), Warsaw, 1928.
- Partja wrogów ludu pracującego (endecja) (The party of the enemies of the working people: National Democracy), Warsaw, 1928.
- Faszyzm współczesny (Contemporary fascism), Warsaw, 1932.
- Świat na wulkanie. Krótki zarys sytuacji międzynarodowej (The world on a volcano: a brief outline of the international situation), Warsaw, 1936.

In 1972, a doctoral dissertation entitled Poglądy filozoficzne Kazimierza Czapińskiego (1882–1941) (The philosophical views of Kazimierz Czapiński, 1882–1941) was completed at the University of Wrocław under the supervision of Professor Andrzej Nowicki. Its author was Colonel Wacław Krawczyk. The dissertation included a bibliography of Czapiński's works, comprising approximately 6,000 items, including books and articles.

== Bibliography ==
- Tych, Feliks, ed.; Stefan Adamski (1985). Słownik Biograficzny Działaczy Polskiego Ruchu Robotniczego [Biographical Dictionary of Activists of the Polish Workers' Movement]. Vol. 1. Warsaw: Książka i Wiedza. ISBN 83-05-11435-X; 83-05-11327-2. OCLC 835903421.
- Adam Ciołkosz, Ludzie PPS, London, 1981.
