= Zofia Wasilkowska =

Polish politician and judge (1910–1996)

- Born: (9 December 1910; Kalisz
- Died: 1 December 1996; Warsaw
- Occupations: Politician, judge

Zofia Wasilkowska née Gawrońska (9 December 1910 – 1 December 1996) was a Polish communist politician.

== Biography ==
The daughter of Tomasz. From 1933 to 1939 she worked as an assistant at the University of Warsaw. In 1948 she joined Polish United Workers' Party. From 1951 to 1954 she was a member of World Peace Council. She was a judge of the Supreme Court in 1948–1953 and 1955–1981 and Minister of Justice in 1956–1957. She was also responsible for women's affairs in 1948–1953. From 1952 to 1961 she was a member of Sejm. From 1948 to 1954 she was a deputy member of the Central Committee of the Polish United Workers' Party. From 1954 to 1959 she was a member of the Central Committee of the Polish United Workers' Party.

She was among founders of the Helsinki Foundation for Human Rights (Poland) in 1990.

She was married to Jan Wasilkowski, their son was Andrzej Wasilkowski.

== Works ==
- Tezy z orzeczeń Francuskiego Sądu Kasacyjnego. 1937.
- Ochrona posiadania w prawie cywilnym. 1938.
- Prawa kobiet w Polsce ludowej. 1952.
- Małżeństwo. Istota, trwałość, rozwód. 1966.
- Prawo w życiu kobiety. 1968.

== Honors and awards ==
- Knight's Cross of the Order of Polonia Restituta (22 July 1947)

== See also ==
- List of Polish Socialist Party politicians
