= Stanczak =

Stanczak is a Polish surname. Notable people with the surname include:

- Adrian Stańczak (born 1987), Polish volleyball player
- Ed Stanczak (1921–2004), American professional basketball player
- Jake Stanczak (born 1981), American disc jockey
- Julian Stanczak (born 1928–2017), American painter and printmaker
- Piotr Stańczak (died 2009), Polish geologist
- Wadeck Stanczak (born 1961), French actor
