= Zofia Praussowa =

Polish politician and feminist

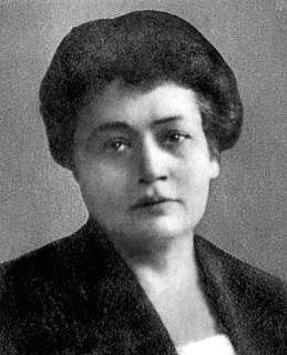

Member of polish Sejm
- In office 5 November 1922 – 8 December 1930

Personal details
- Born: 3 September 1878 Budzów, Congress Poland, Russian Empire
- Died: January 1945 (aged 66) Auschwitz-Birkenau, German-occupied Poland

Zofia Praussowa (3 September 1878 – 27 January 1945) was a Polish politician, activist of the Polish Socialist Party, member of Polish Sejm (1922–1930), labor inspector and feminist.

== Early life and political career ==
She was born in a family of landowners, she was taking lessons in junior high schools in Częstochowa and Kazan. In 1904 she finished so called Bestuzhev Courses in Saint Petersburg on the Mathematics Department. From 1899 she has been involved in the activity of PPS. After finishing studies, she came back to Poland and became a PPS activist in the area of Częstochowa and Zakopane. In 1907 she started her mathematical studies on the parisian Sorbonne which she finished in 1911. After that, she came back to Zakopane and started a coeducational high school.

She got arrested for the first time in 1905 for the distribution of appeals against the conscription to the tsarist army. For this act she was sent to Russia however, she quickly escaped from there. In 1906 she was arrested again and imprisoned in the Pawiak prison.

In 1922 she was elected to Sejm, from the list of PPS. In 1928 she was chosen again to be a part of Sejm, but in 1930 she didn't receive a parliamentary mandate

During World War II, Zofia Praussowa was a part of Związek Walki Zbrojnej - AK. On 10 November 1942 she got arrested by the Germans and imprisoned in the Pawiak prison. Later, she stayed in the Majdanek concentration camp and Auschwitz. She was murdered shortly before the camp was liberated.

== Private life ==
She was a wife of Ksawery Prauss. Daughters: Jadwiga i Ewa Prauss-Płoska, wife of Stanisław Płoski and mother of Zofia Romaszewska.

== See also ==
- Józef Piłsudski
- Polish Socialist Party
- Union of Armed Struggle

== Bibliography ==
- E. Zając. Zofia Praussowa inspektor i polityk. "Atest". 648, page 54, maj 2001. Warsaw: SIGMA. ISSN 1230-4700.
- J.M. Majchrowski, K. Stepan, G. Mazur: Kto kim był w drugiej Rzeczypospolitej. Warsaw: Polska Oficyna Wydawnicza "BGW", 1994. ISBN 83-7066-569-1
