= Progressive Women's Political Club =

Women's Political Club
- Klub Polityczny Kobiet Postępowych
- Formation: 1919
- Purpose: Support women's rights
- Official language: Polish

Women's Political Club (Polish: Klub Polityczny Kobiet Postępowych) was a Polish women's organisation. It was founded in 1919 to encourage women to use the new political rights and equality granted in the constitution of the new Polish state in all of areas of society. It was a progressive political club for educated elite women.
