= Suchcice, Łódź Voivodeship =

Suchcice
- Village
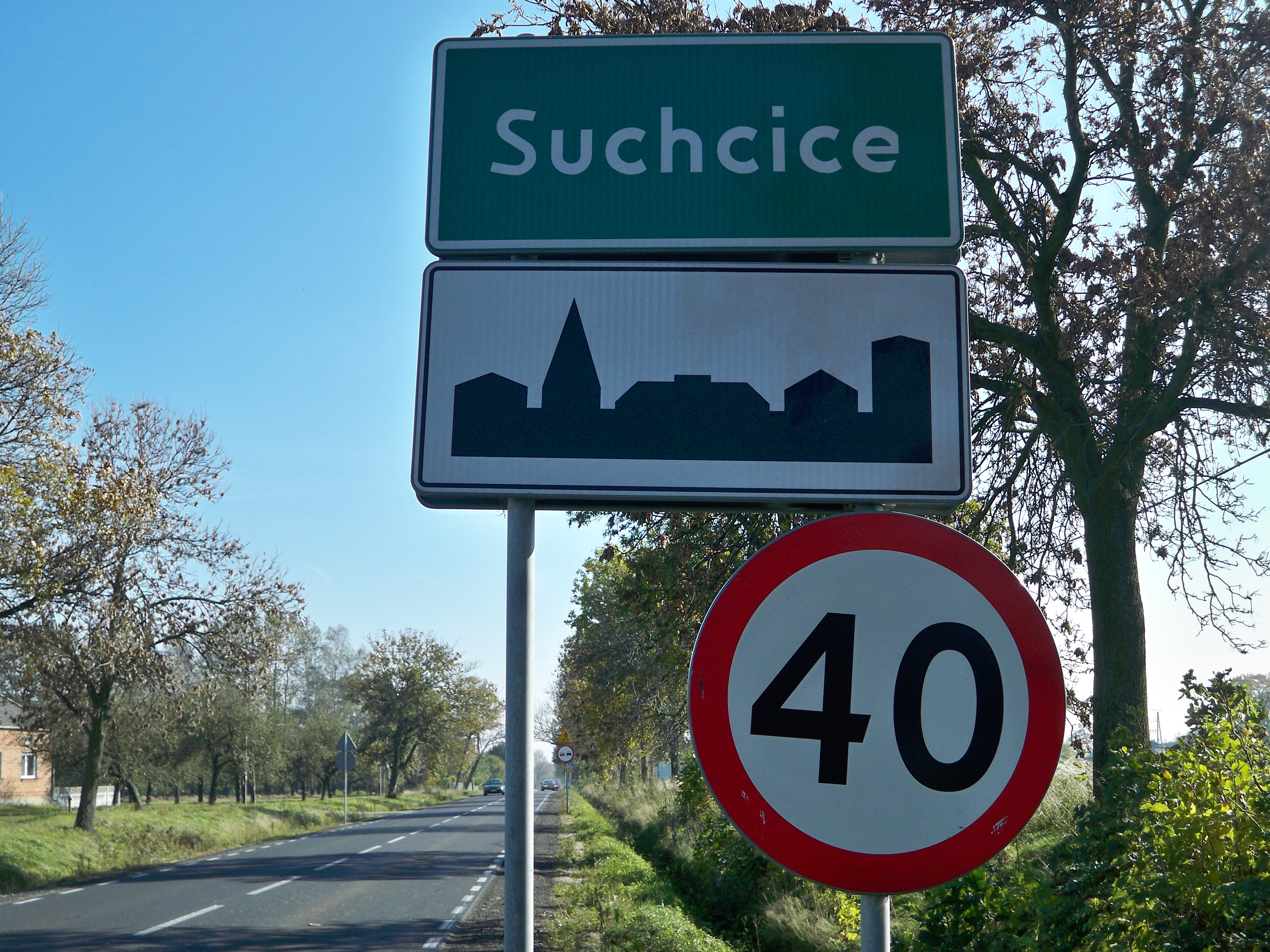

- Location within Poland
- Coordinates: 51°25′N 19°26′E
- Country: Poland
- Voivodeship: Łódź
- County: Bełchatów
- Gmina: Drużbice

Suchcice [suxˈt͡ɕit͡sɛ] is a village in the administrative district of Gmina Drużbice, within Bełchatów County, Łódź Voivodeship, in central Poland. This village has monumental church of saint Ignatius of Loyola.
