= Stanisław Dubois =

Polish journalist and political activist

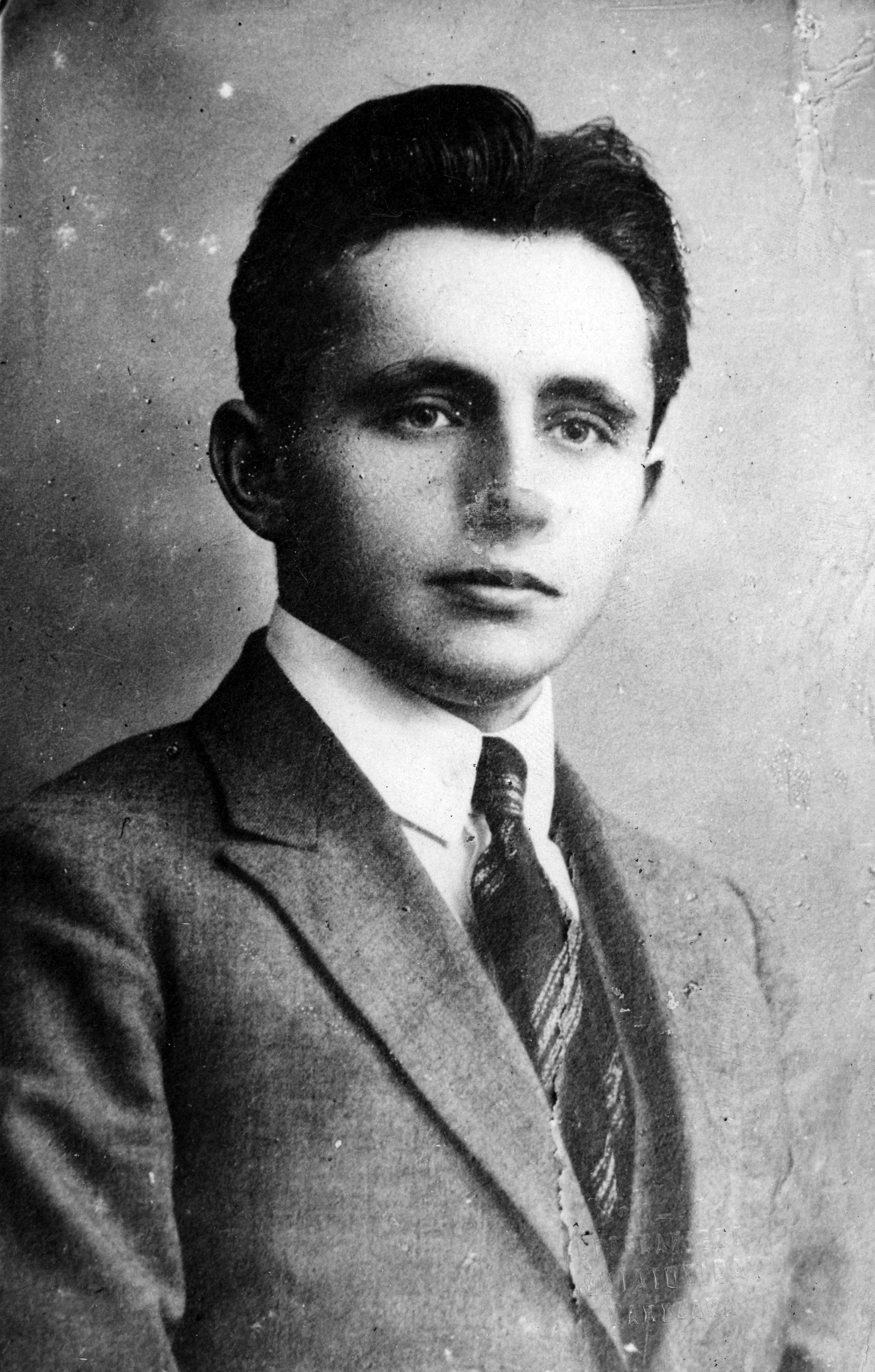
- Stanisław Dubois

Personal details
- Born: 9 January 1901 Warsaw, Congress Poland, Russian Empire
- Died: 21 August 1942 (aged 41) Auschwitz-Birkenau, German-occupied Poland
- Party: Polish Socialist Party
- Occupation: Politician, activist

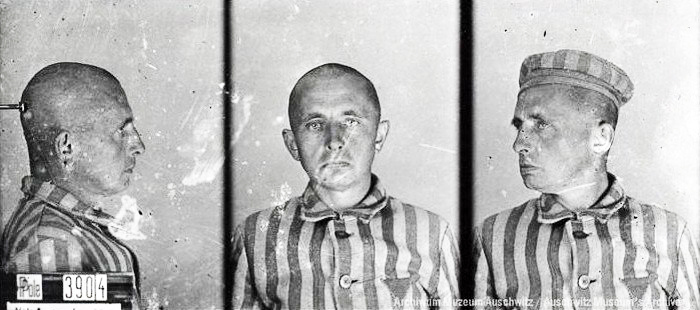
Stanisław Dubois in KL-Auschwitz

Stanisław Józef Dubois (9 January 1901 – 21 August 1942) was a Polish journalist and political activist in the Second Polish Republic, member of the left wing of the Polish Socialist Party, as well as the Youth Organisation of the Workers' University Society (Organizacja Młodzieży Towarzystwa Uniwersytetu Robotniczego). After participating in the Polish resistance movement in World War II, Dubois was arrested by the German occupation authorities and executed in Auschwitz-Birkenau concentration camp.

== Biography ==
He became involved in pro-independence and socialist activism as a student at Wojciech Górski Gymnasium in Warsaw. After World War I he joined the Polish Socialist Party, and took part in the Silesian Uprisings and the Polish–Soviet War.

Dubois was a founder and chairman of the Red Scouts (Czerwone Harcerstwo Towarzystwa Uniwersytetu Robotniczego). He served as a member of Sejm (lower house of parliament) from 1928 to 1933, and as a Warsaw city councillor from 1938. He also worked as an editorial secretary for the Robotnik (lit. 'Worker') daily newspaper.

As an opponent of Sanation, he was charged in 1930 with communist agitation in Lwów, and sentenced to 3 years in prison during the Brest trials. He was held at the Brest Fortress, and, while imprisoned, ran in the 1930 Polish legislative election. He was released the following month.

His great-grandfather, Charles August Dubois, was a French officer of Napoleon's Grande Armée.

== World War II ==
Dubois participated in the Polish resistance movement in World War II. In 1940 he was arrested in Warsaw, held at Pawiak prison, and subsequently taken to Auschwitz-Birkenau, where he conspired with Witold Pilecki to gather intelligence inside the camp. He was executed at the camp in 1942, under the command of Maximilian Grabner and Gerhard Palitzsch.

== Selected works ==
- Stanisław Dubois, Dzień Młodzieży Robotniczej 1927
- Stanisław Dubois, Obrazki z niezbyt odległych okolic 1928
- Stanisław Dubois, Przemówienie w związku z pacyfikacją w Małopolsce wschodniej 1931
- Stanisław Dubois, W czerwonym Borysławiu 1931
- Stanisław Dubois, Przemówienie przeciwko cenzurze sanacyjnej 1932
- Stanisław Dubois, Przemówienie w dyskusji nad ustawą o szkołach akademickich 1933
- Stanisław Dubois, Pogrzeb krakowski. Ulica łzami zmyta... 1936
- Stanisław Dubois, Nie bardzo podłe miasto Mińsk Mazowiecki jak po oblężeniu 1936
- Stanisław Dubois, 300 milionów i 200 rodzin. Tylko 300 milionów. 1937
- Stanisław Dubois, Pod ciężkim jarzmem. Mniejszość polska w Niemczech 1938

== See also ==
- List of Nazi-German concentration camps
- The Holocaust in Poland
- World War II casualties of Poland
