= Jan Kwapiński =

Polish politician

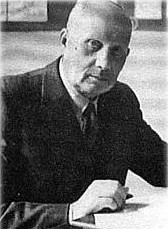
Jan Kwapiński in 1939

Jan Kwapiński, born Piotr Chałupka (12 November 1885 – 4 November 1964), was a Polish independence activist and politician. A member of Combat Organization of the Polish Socialist Party, he was imprisoned by Russian Empire authorities in Warsaw Citadel. After Poland regained independence following the First World War, he became a member of Polish parliament (Sejm) after being elected in 1922 Polish legislative election. He then went on to serve as mayor of Łódź (1939). After being Soviet invasion of Poland arrested by the NKVD, then freed after the Sikorski-Mayski Agreement, he joined the London-based Polish government-in-exile as Deputy Prime Minister and Minister of Industry, Trade and Shipping, later Minister of Treasury.

== Early political career ==
An official publication of the Polish government-in-exile, March 1944, provides the following information, likely from the subject himself (brackets added showing his ages in the narrative):

"Jan Kwapinski (correct pronunciation: Kv-a-pin-ski), Deputy Prime Minister and Minister of Industry, Commerce and Shipping, son of a worker and a metal worker himself, has long been one of the most prominent figures in Poland's labor and political movement.

Born in Warsaw in 1885, his life reflects the turbulent history of the Polish patriotic revolutionary movement. From his early youth he took an active part in the underground organization. He joined the Polish Socialist Party in 1902 and played an active role in the anti-Czarist uprising of 1905.^{[a]} When the revolt failed, Kwapinski made his escape to Kraków (then in Austrian Poland), where he continued his political activities. After his return to Russian Poland in 1906 he took part in underground revolutionary organization. The following year he was arrested by the Czarist police and sentenced to 15 years hard labor. Having organized the prisoners' rebellion in the Lomza Prison, he managed to escape, but was caught and removed to Orel Prison, where he remained until 1917, when the Russian Revolution set him free.

Back in Poland in 1918, he was elected to the Central Committee of the Polish Socialist Party, of which he later became Vice-Chairman. His concern for the fate of the Polish workers and peasants led to his appointment, during the twenty years of Polish independence, as President of the Farm Workers Union and Polish Trade Union Congress.

When the Soviets entered Poland, Kwapinski, who remained in Poland during both invasions, was deported to Siberia. Released after the signing of the Polish-Russian treaty in July 1941, he proceeded to London where he was appointed to the Polish Cabinet and was made chairman of the Committee of the Polish Socialist Party. Since General Sikorski's death (in July 1943), Mr. Kwapinski holds the post of Vice-Premier."

== Polish government-in-exile ==
Following Prime Minister Władysław Sikorski's death in an airplane crash on 4 July 1943 a new government-in-exile was formed under Prime Minister Stanislaw Mikolajczyk, who had been appointed by President Władysław Raczkiewicz.^{[b]} On 14 July 1943 Prime Minister Mikolajczyk formed a coalition cabinet from the four main Polish political groups, and including, besides Jews, some without party affiliation. He named Jan Kwapiński of the Polish Socialist Party as Vice Prime Minister as well as Minister of Industry, Commerce and Shipping.

On 29 October 1943, Kwapiński flew, with other diplomats aboard the Pan American Airways Boeing 314A 'Capetown Clipper', from Foynes, Éire to New York City, as "Deputy Premier" of Poland, arriving 5 November 1943, to attend the Atlantic City, New Jersey UNRRA conference. He was Polish signatory to the agreement at the White House on 9 November 1943.^{[c]} In London, in January 1944, Mikolajczyk and Kwapiński were the chief Polish moderates with whom British Foreign Secretary Anthony Eden sought to resolve a crisis with the Soviets concerning the long contentious issue of the Polish-Russian frontier. On 23 November 1944, three days before Prime Minister Mikolajczyk resigned, Kwapiński left his own posts. However he was for seven months Treasury Minister under the succeeding Prime Minister, Tomasz Arciszewski, from 29 November 1944 until 28 June 1945—eight days before the United Kingdom and the United States, following the February 1945 Yalta Conference agreement with Joseph Stalin, withdrew recognition of the Polish government in exile. Remaining an émigré, Jan Kwapiński died in London in 1964.

=== Timeline of political activities ===
1902
joins Polish Socialist Party, age 17.

1905 active role in "June days" anti-Czarist uprising, flees to Warsaw.

1906
returns to Russian Poland, takes part in underground revolutionary organization.

1907
arrested by Czarist police, sentenced to 15 years hard labor. Organizes prisoners' rebellion in Łomża Prison, escapes, captured, moved to Oryol Prison.

1917
freed by Russian Revolution, returns to Poland.

1918
formation of Second Polish Republic; elected to the Central Committee of Polish Socialist Party, later Vice-Chairman; President of Farm Workers Union and Polish Trade Union Congress.

1939
3 March-3 September mayor of Łódź until invaded by Germany; 1 September German invasion of Poland; 17 September Soviet invasion, deported to Siberia; end of Second Polish Republic. 27 September fall of Warsaw.

1941
July freed (in advance of 17 August?), appointed in London to Polish Cabinet, chair of the Committee of the Polish Socialist Party; 30 July Polish-Soviet pact; 17 August signing of Sikorski-Mayski Agreement, freeing many Poles; 4 December Stalin-Sikorski agreement.

1942
"Introduction" (12 pp.). Kwapiński, Jan and A. Greenwood. Towards a New Poland: A Programme of the Polish Underground Movement. London: Liberty Publications, 1942. Transl. of Program Polski Ludowej (Towards a New Poland) 1941 samidzat.

1943
13 April German announcement of Katyn massacre; 25 April Stalin suspends relations between USSR and Poland; 4 July General Sikorski killed; 14 July Vice-Premier in new Polish Mikolajczyk government-in-exile; 9 November signs UNRRA document for Poland, in Washington.

1944
January, with Mikolajczyk and Anthony Eden, seeks to resolve crisis with Soviets; May Polish units distinguished in capture of Monte Cassino, breaking of Hitler Line, opening way to Rome; June Government-in-exile issues Monte Cassino Commemorative Cross; 21 July "Lublin" Polish Committee of National Liberation (PKWN) formed by Soviets; Government-in-exile, together with UK and US protest; 23 November resigns his posts in Government-in-exile; 26 November Mikolajczyk resigns as Prime Minister; 29 November appointed Treasury Minister in Arciszewski government.

1945
1 January Provisional Government of the Republic of Poland replaces PKWN, Mikolajczyk accepts Deputy Premiership; 4–11 February Yalta Conference, Poland not invited; 28 June resigns post of Treasury Minister; 6 July UK and US withdraw recognition of Polish Government-in-exile, loss of embassy in London; 17 July-7 August at Potsdam Conference Provisional Government accepted as official Polish government by Big Three, Polish borders redrawn.

1947
Publication: Kwapiński, Jan - 1939–1945. Kartki z pamietnika (Swiatowy Zwiazek Polakow z Zagranicy, London 1947)

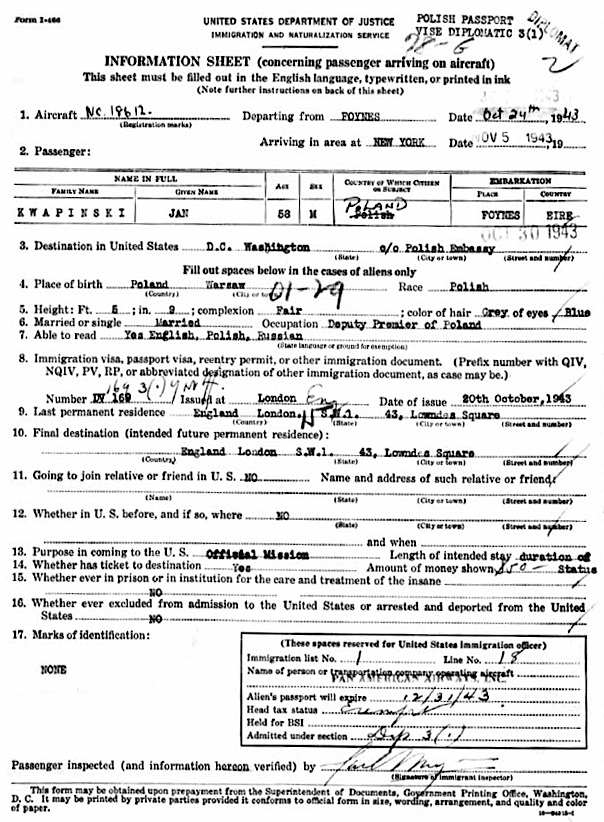
Copy of NYC landing paper for Kwapiński

== Notes ==
a Piotr Chałupka, of a working-class family in Warsaw, worked as a teenager in metal factories in Ostrowiec, where he became involved with the Polish Socialist Party. During the 1905 revolution he was a member of the Polish Socialist Party Combat Organization, which sent him to Lodz. See transl. of .

b Poland, which never surrendered, was the first invaded nation to form a recognized exiled government with full cabinet. Its legitimacy had been arranged through Article 24 of the Polish Constitution, which empowered the President to appoint a successor without approval of the Sejm. Thus, on 30 September 1939, President Ignacy Mościcki, interned in Romania as a refugee, had appointed by letter Władysław Raczkiewicz (safe in Paris) as his successor. The new president had, in turn, appointed as Premier General Sikorski, then serving as commander-in-chief of the Polish army in France. Britain and France recognized the new government, extending it financial credit. For details and context, see Wikipedia entry "Polish government-in-exile".

c Particulars of the trip and of the diplomat's person may be seen in his New York landing paper, shown left. (9 November is German Schicksalstag.) For graphic suggestion of Poland's benefit from UNRRA relief see

== See also ==
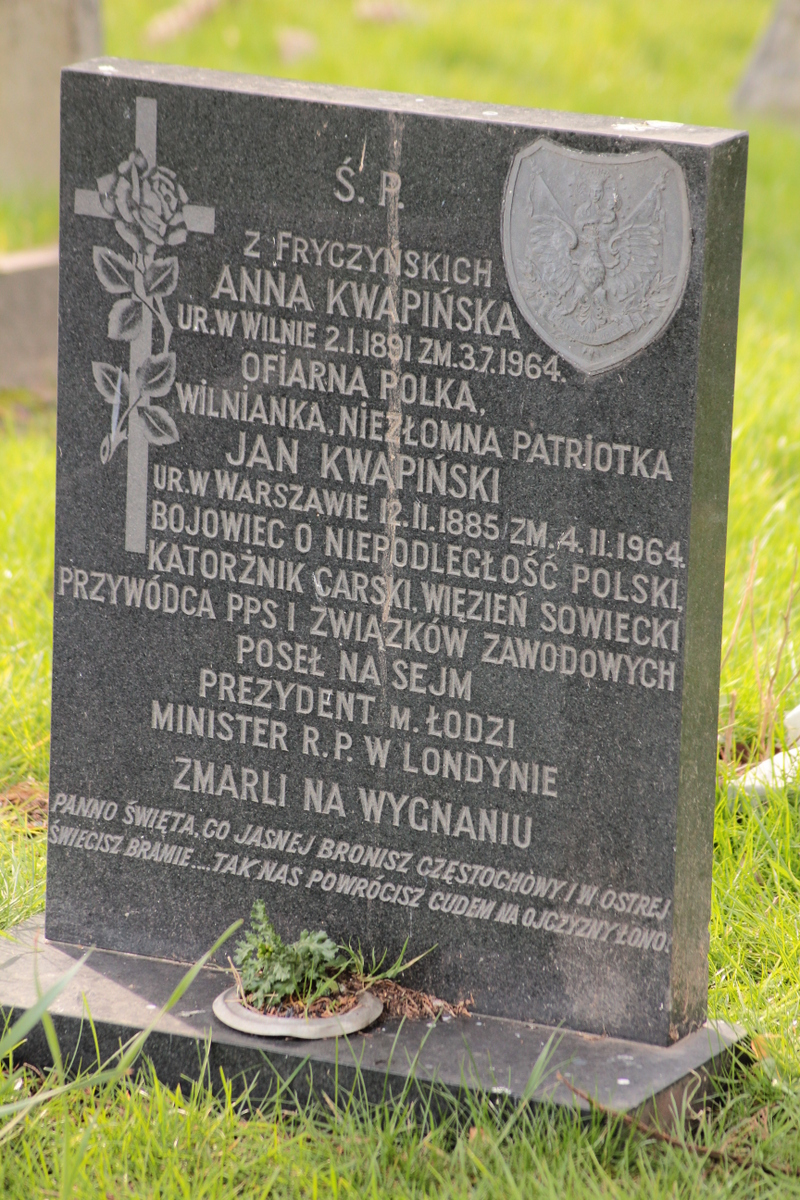
Kwapiński's grave in Streatham Cemetery

- History of Poland (1939-1945)
- Polish government-in-exile
- Western betrayal
