= Teodora Męczkowska =

Teodora Maria Męczkowska
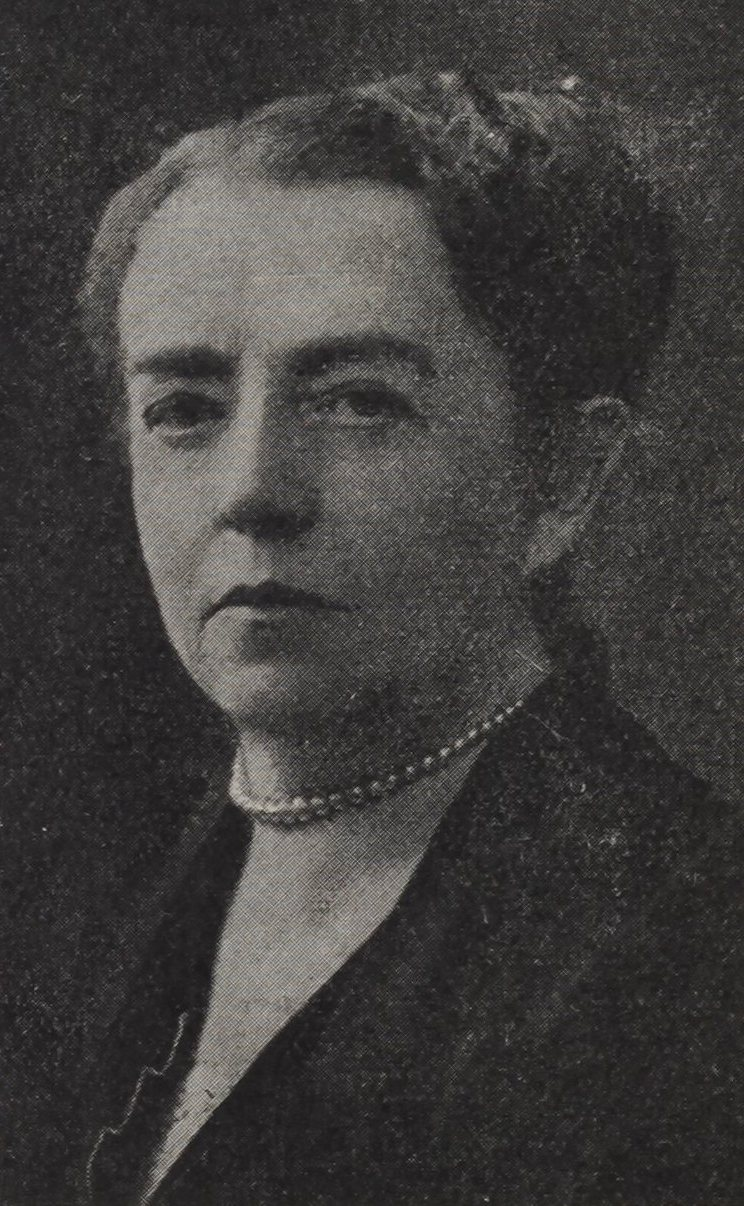
- Born: 5 September 1870; Łowicz, Congress Poland
- Died: 11 December 1954 (aged 84); Warsaw, Poland
- Education: University of Geneva
- Occupations: Feminist, teacher and suffragette
- Spouse: Wacław Męczkowski

Teodora Męczkowska, née Oppman (5 September 1870 – 11 December 1954), was a Polish feminist, suffragette and educator.

== Life ==
Teodora Maria Męczkowska was born in Łowicz, Congress Poland, on 5 September 1870. She graduated from high school in 1888 and moved to Switzerland two years later. She earned a B.A. in the natural sciences from the University of Geneva in 1896 and married the physician and independence activist Wacław Męczkowski a year before graduating. They settled in Warsaw, Vistula Land, as Congress Poland became known under Russian efforts to consolidate control, and agreed to have no children. She taught in a girls' school in Warsaw before the start of World War I in 1914 and was a member of the Warsaw Pedagogical Society (Polish: Towarzystwo Pedagogiczne w Warszawie) from 1903. Męczkowska became Poland's first female schools inspector after it became independent in 1918; she held the position until she retired in 1934. During World War II, she covertly taught classes during the German occupation of Poland and fled to Zakopane, Poland, after the defeat of the Warsaw Uprising in 1944. She returned to Warsaw after the end of the war and taught high-school biology until her death on 11 December 1954.

== Activities ==
Męczkowska was briefly a member of the Union for the Equal Rights of Polish Women (Polish: Związek Równouprawnienia Kobiet Polskich) in 1907, but found it too radical for her taste and started the more moderate Polish Women's Rights Association (Polish: Polskie Stowarzyszenie Równouprawnienia Kobiet). She attended all four of the women's congresses held in Poland (1905, 1907, 1917, and 1938) and was President of the Central Committee of Polish Women's Rights (Polish: Centralny Komitet Równouprawnienia Kobiet Polskich) in newly independent Poland.
