= Feliks Gross =

Polish-American sociologist

Feliks Gross (June 17, 1906 in Kraków - November 9, 2006 in New York City) was a Polish-American sociologist.

Before World War II, he became a lecturer at the Jagiellonian University in Kraków, Poland. During the war, he escaped to USA, where he would hold many positions in academia, including a professorship at Graduate Centre and Brooklyn College in City University of New York and at the University of Wyoming.

Gross wrote more than 20 books and uncounted articles published in many languages.

The Feliks Gross Endowment Award was established at CUNY in his memory. This award is given annually to one to two assistant professors in recognition of outstanding research in the humanities or sciences.

== Selected works ==
- Citizenship and Ethnicity 1999
- Ethnics in a Borderland 1978
- Violence in Politics 1972
- Federacje i konfederacje europejskie: rodowód i wizje 1994
- Foreign policy analysis 1954
- Ideologies, Goals, and Values 1985
- Proletariat i kultura: warunki społeczne i gospodarcze kultury proletariatu 1938
- The Civic and the Tribal State 1998
- The Revolutionary Party 1974
- The seizure of political power in a century of revolutions 1958
- Tolerancja i pluralizm 1992
- Wartości, nauka i świadectwa epoki 2002
- Wspomnienie o Adamie Ciołkoszu 1987
- Koczownictwo 1936
