= Polish Socialist Party =

Political party in Poland

Polish Socialist Party Polska Partia Socjalistyczna
- Abbreviation: PPS
- President: Wojciech Konieczny
- Founded: 1892 (original form); 1987 (current form)
- Headquarters: al. Niepodległości 161 lok. 2 Warsaw
- Youth wing: Young Socialists PPS
- Ideology: Democratic socialism
- Political position: Centre-left to left-wing
- National affiliation: The Left; Democratic Bloc (1947–1948); Centrolew (1929–1931)
- Colours: Red
- Anthem: The Standard of Revolt
- Sejm: 0 / 460
- Senate: 1 / 100
- European Parliament: 0 / 53
- Regional assemblies: 0 / 552
- City Presidents: 0 / 107

Party flag
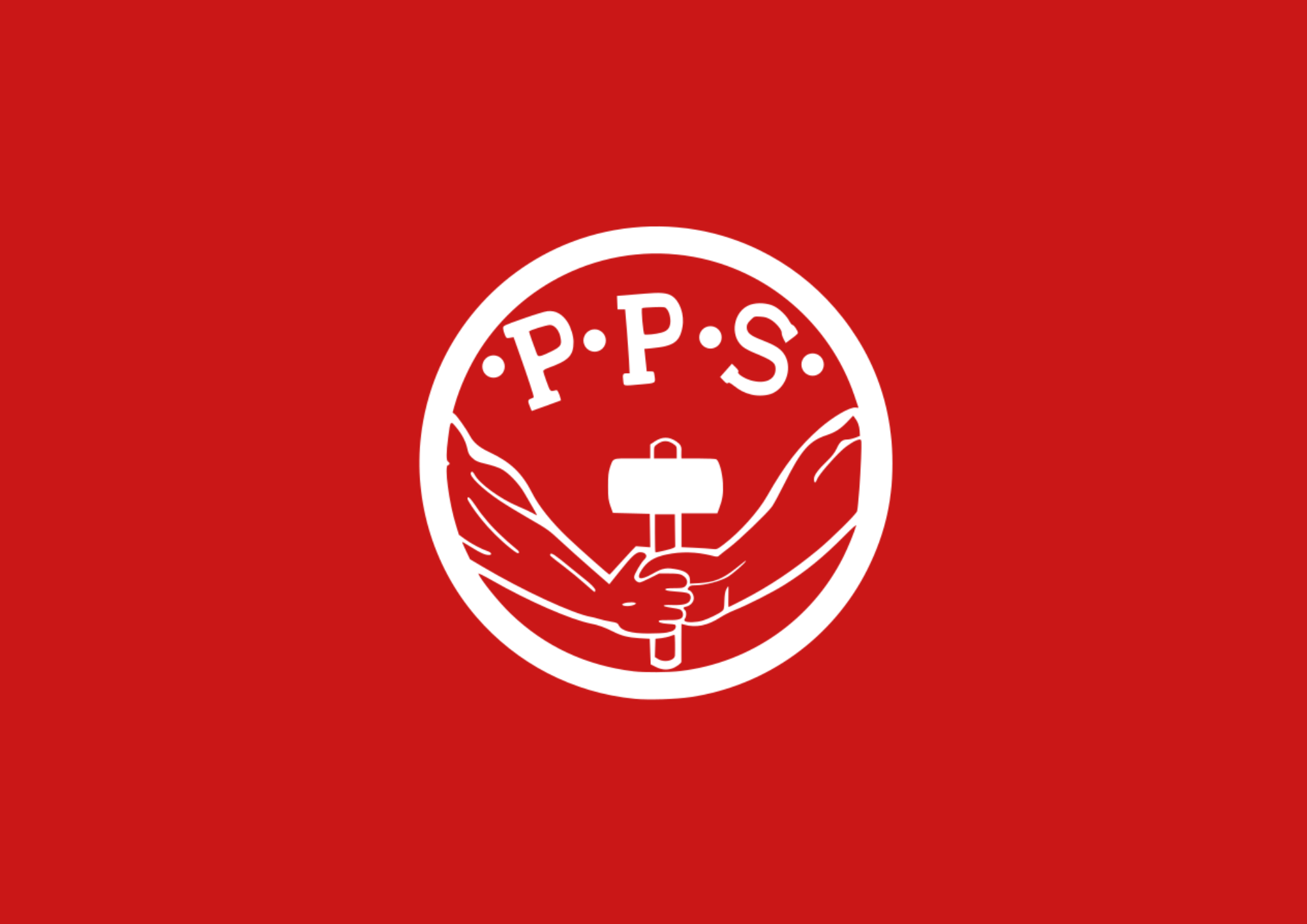

Website
- ppspl.eu

Timeline of Polish socialist/social democratic parties after 1986
•Polish Socialist Party (1987–)
•Polish Social Democratic Union (1990–1992)
•Social Democracy of the Republic of Poland (1990–1999)
•Democratic-Social Movement (1991–1992)
•Labour Union (1992–)
•National Party of Retirees and Pensioners (1994–)
•Democratic Left Alliance (1999–2021)
•Reason Party (2002–2013)
•Social Democracy of Poland (2004–)
•Freedom and Equality (2005–)
•Polish Left (2008–)
•Partia Razem (2015–)
•Spring (2019–2021)
•New Left (2021–)

The Polish Socialist Party (Polish: Polska Partia Socjalistyczna, PPS) is a democratic socialist political party in Poland.

It was one of the most significant parties in Poland from its founding in 1892 until its forced merger with the communist Polish Workers' Party to form the Polish United Workers' Party in 1948. Józef Piłsudski, founder of the Second Polish Republic, was a member of and later led the PPS in the early 20th century.

The party was re-established in 1987, near the end of the Polish People's Republic. However, it remained on the margins of Polish politics until 2019, when it won a seat in the Senate of Poland.

== History ==
The Polish Socialist Party (PPS) was founded in Paris in 1892, during the period known as the Great Emigration. In 1893, a faction called the Social Democracy of the Kingdom of Poland and Lithuania (SDKPiL) split from the PPS. The PPS focused more on nationalism and Polish independence, while the SDKPiL adopted a far-left (Marxist), internationalist stance. In November 1892, key members of the PPS developed a political program that, for its time, was notably progressive. The program called for an independent Republic of Poland founded on democratic principles, direct universal voting rights, equal rights for all citizens regardless of religion or gender, freedom of the press, speech, and assembly, progressive taxation, an eight-hour workday, a minimum wage, equal pay for men and women, a ban on child labor (under age 14), free education, and social support for workers injured on the job.

After the Revolution of 1905 in the Russian Empire, the party membership drastically increased from several hundred active members to a mass movement of about 60,000 members. Another split in the party occurred in 1906, with the Revolutionary Faction following Józef Piłsudski, who supported the nationalist and independence ideals, and the Left faction which allied itself with the SDKPiL. However, the Revolutionary Faction became dominant and renamed itself back again to the PPS, while the Left was eclipsed, and in 1918 merged with SDKPiL, forming the Communist Party of Poland. In 1917-1918, the party participated in the Central Council of Ukraine and the Government of Ukraine.

During the Second Polish Republic, the PPS at first supported Józef Piłsudski (himself a former Socialist), including his May Coup, but later moved into the opposition to his authoritarian Sanacja regime by joining the democratic "centrolew" (center-left) opposition movement. Many PPS leaders and members were put on trial by Piłsudski's regime and jailed in the infamous Bereza Kartuska prison.

The party was a member of the Labour and Socialist International between 1923 and 1940.

In mid-1921, the PPS had approximately 55,000 members. The party traditionally maintained close ties with the trade union and cooperative movements. It also cooperated with organizations within its sphere of influence, including the Workers' University Society (Polish: Towarzystwo Uniwersytetu Robotniczego, TUR), the Red Scouting movement (Polish: Czerwone Harcerstwo), the Class Trade Unions (Polish: Klasowe Związki Zawodowe) and the Union of Independent Socialist Youth (Polish: Związek Niezależnej Młodzieży Socjalistycznej).

The Workers' University Society played an important role in the party's educational and cultural activities. It promoted self-education, organized public lectures, engaged in publishing activities and encouraged artistic expression among workers. It also established adult education institutions known as universytety powszechne. On 15 August 1938, TUR had 209 branches and approximately 10,000 members. The organization also operated among the Polish community in France.

The party supported the Polish resistance during World War II as the underground Polish Socialist Party – Freedom, Equality, Independence (Polska Partia Socjalistyczna – Wolność, Równość, Niepodległość). In 1948, it suffered a fatal split, as the Communists applied the salami tactics to dismember any opposition. One faction, which included Edward Osóbka-Morawski, wanted to join forces with the Polish Peasant Party and form a united front against the Communists. Another faction, led by Józef Cyrankiewicz, argued that the Socialists should support the Communists in carrying through a socialist program while opposing the imposition of one-party rule. Pre-war political hostilities continued to influence events, and Stanisław Mikołajczyk, leader of the Peasant Party, would not agree to form a united front with the Socialists. The Communists played on these divisions by dismissing Osóbka-Morawski and making Cyrankiewicz the Prime Minister.

In 1948, Cyrankiewicz's faction of Socialists merged with the Communist Polish Workers' Party (PPR) to form the Polish United Workers' Party (Polska Zjednoczona Partia Robotnicza; PZPR), the ruling party in the Polish People's Republic; remnants of the other faction survived on emigration in the Polish government-in-exile and because of that Polish Socialist Party was still active on emigration. Cyrankiewicz's faction isn't really treated as a proper PPS.

== Refoundation and present ==
A new party sharing the same name, aiming to continue the legacy of the original PPS, was founded in 1987 by left-wing opposition figures like Jan Józef Lipski. However, the modern PPS has remained a marginal force in the political landscape of the Third Republic of Poland, holding representation in the Sejm only from 1993 to 2001, due to the lingering stigma of communism associated with Soviet occupation. In the 2019 Polish parliamentary election, the PPS experienced a resurgence with its leader Wojciech Konieczny being elected to the Senate of Poland as part of The Left. Subsequently, other members of both the Sejm and Senate joined the PPS.

Its main propaganda outlet was the Robotnik ('The Worker') newspaper. The current party published the Nowy Robotnik ("The New Worker"), a continuation of the original publication, from 2003 to 2006.

On 16 November 2020, the party founded its first foreign branch in the United Kingdom, in the city of Coventry, home to a British Polish population founded by Polish Army Exiles.

On 25 June 2022, factions of the party formed an alliance with Social Democracy of Poland, Freedom and Equality, Labour Union and Polish Left to compete in the next Polish parliamentary election. The alliance also included the Feminist Initiative, the Democratic Left Association (SLD), and the Working People's Movement. In February 2023, after an internal conflict, PPS, together with the Labour Union, re-joined The Left.

== Ideology ==
Historically, the party advocated for a blend of socialism and nationalism, and was generally considered to be a left-wing or a centre-left party on the political spectrum. The party opposed Bolshevism and aligned more with the Mensheviks. In recent years, the party has identified as a democratic socialist movement, with its parliamentary leader Wojciech Konieczny describing it as a leftist party with a strong emphasis on democracy. As a modern party, it distanced itself from anti-clericalism, declaring that it does not wish to wage "war against God", accepting the concordat between Poland and the Vatican, along with the position of the Catholic Church in Polish society. It is in favour of EU integration.

== Election results ==
=== Presidential ===
Second Polish Republic
Election	Candidate	1st round		2nd round	
Election	Candidate	Votes	%	Votes	%
1922	Ignacy Daszyński	49	9.1 (#5)	1	0.2 (#5)
1926	Supported Józef Piłsudski (Note: Declined to take the office.)	292	60.2 (#1)		
1926	Zygmunt Marek	56	11.6 (#3)	1	0.2 (#3)

Third Polish Republic
Election	Candidate	1st round		2nd round	
Election	Candidate	Votes	%	Votes	%
1995	Supported Tadeusz Zieliński	631,432	3.5 (#6)		
2000	Piotr Ikonowicz	38,672	0.2 (#10)		
2005	Supported Daniel Podrzycki (Note: Podrzycki died a day prior to the election in a car accident.)				
2020	Supported Robert Biedroń	432,129	2.2 (#6)		
2025	Supported Magdalena Biejat	829,361	4.23 (#7)		

=== Sejm ===
Election	Votes	%	Seats	+/–	Government
1919	515,062	9.2 (#4)	35 / 394	New	Coalition (1919)
1919	515,062	9.2 (#4)	35 / 394	New	Opposition (1919-1920)
1919	515,062	9.2 (#4)	35 / 394	New	Coalition (1920-1921)
1919	515,062	9.2 (#4)	35 / 394	New	Opposition (1921-1922)
1922	906,537	10.3 (#5)	41 / 444	▲6	Opposition (1922-1925)
1922	906,537	10.3 (#5)	41 / 444	▲6	Coalition (1925-1926)
1922	906,537	10.3 (#5)	41 / 444	▲6	Opposition (1926)
1922	906,537	10.3 (#5)	41 / 444	▲6	Coalition (1926-1928)
1928	1,482,097	13.0 (#2)	64 / 444	▲23	Opposition
1930	1,965,864	17.3 (#2)	23 / 444	▼41	Opposition
1930	As part of the Centrolew coalition, that won 79 seats in total.				
1935	Boycotted		0 / 206	▼23	No seats
1938	Boycotted		0 / 208	0	No seats
1947	9,003,682	26.13 (#1)	116 / 444	▲116	Coalition
1947	As part of the Democratic Bloc coalition, which won 394 seats in total. (Note: Only communist faction.)				
1991	230,975	2.1 (#13)	0 / 460	▼116	No seats
1991	As part of the Labour Solidarity coalition, that won 4 seats in total.				
1993	2,815,169	20.4 (#1)	4 / 460	▲4	Coalition
1993	As part of the Democratic Left Alliance coalition, which won 171 seats in total.				
1997	3,551,224	27.1 (#2)	3 / 460	▼1	Opposition
1997	As part of the Democratic Left Alliance coalition, which won 164 seats in total.				
2001	13,459	0.1 (#11)	0 / 460	▼3	No seats
2005	91,266	0.8 (#11)	0 / 460	0	No seats
2005	As part of the Polish Labour Party committee, that won no seats.				
2007	160,476	1.0 (#7)	0 / 460	0	No seats
2007	As part of the Polish Labour Party committee, that won no seats.				
2011	1,184,303	8.2 (#5)	0 / 460	0	No seats
2011	As part of the Democratic Left Alliance coalition, which won 27 seats in total.				
2015	1,147,102	7.6 (#5)	0 / 460	0	No seats
2015	As part of the United Left coalition, which won no seats.				
2019	2,319,946	12.6 (#3)	0 / 460	0	No seats
2019	As part of The Left coalition, which won 49 seats in total.				
2023	1,859,018	8.6 (#4)	0 / 460	0	No seats
2023	As part of The Left coalition, which won 26 seats in total.				

=== Senate ===
Election	Votes	%	Seats	+/–
1922	468,147	8.4 (#5)	7 / 111	n/a
1928	715,556	11.2 (#3)	10 / 111	▲3
1930	As part of Centrolew coalition, that won 13 seats in total.			
1935	Boycotted			
1938	Boycotted			
1993	4,993,061	35.7 (#1)	1 / 100	▲1
1993	As part of the Democratic Left Alliance coalition, which won 37 seats in total.			
1997	6,091,721	45.7 (#2)	3 / 100	▲2
1997	As part of the Democratic Left Alliance coalition, which won 28 seats in total.			
2001	131,987	0.5 (#11)	0 / 100	▼3
2019	415,745	2.3 (#4)	1 / 100	▲1
2019	As part of The Left coalition, which won 2 seats in total.			

=== European Parliament ===
Election	Votes	%	Seats	+/–	EP Group
2004	48,667	0.80 (#12)	0 / 54	New	–
2004	As part of the KPEiR-PLD coalition, that won no seats.				
2009	1,331	0.02 (#12)	0 / 50	0	–
2014	Did not contest		0 / 50	0	–
2019	Did not contest		0 / 50	0	–
2024	741,071	6.30 (#5)	0 / 50	0	–
2024	As part of The Left coalition, that won 3 seats in total.				

== Notable people who were members or were associated with PPS ==
=== Presidents and heads of state ===
- Józef Piłsudski (former member at time in office)
- Stanisław Wojciechowski (former member)
- Ignacy Mościcki (former member)

==== Presidents-in-exile ====
- Stanisław Ostrowski
- Franciszek Trąbalski

=== Prime ministers ===
- Ignacy Daszyński
- Jędrzej Moraczewski
- Janusz Jędrzejewicz (former member)
- Walery Sławek (former member)
- Edward Osóbka-Morawski (later became a communist)
- Józef Cyrankiewicz (later became a communist)

==== Prime ministers-in-exile ====
- Tomasz Arciszewski
- Tadeusz Tomaszewski
- Antoni Pająk
- Alfred Urbański

=== Other figures ===
- Norbert Barlicki
- Józef Biniszkiewicz
- Adam Ciołkosz
- Lidia Ciołkosz
- Jerzy Czeszejko-Sochacki (later became a communist)
- Piotr Ikonowicz
- Wojciech Konieczny
- Jan Kwapiński
- Herman Lieberman
- Jan Józef Lipski
- Bolesław Limanowski
- Stanisław Mendelson
- Stanisław Dubois
- Jan Mulak
- Mieczysław Niedziałkowski
- Antoni Pajdak
- Feliks Perl
- Zofia Praussowa
- Kazimierz Pużak
- Kazimierz Sosnkowski
- Czesław Świrski
- Jan Stańczyk
- Leon Wasilewski
- Aleksandra Zagórska
- Iza Zielińska

== See also ==
- List of Polish Socialist Party politicians
- Central Rada
- List of anti-capitalist and communist parties with national parliamentary representation
