= Semen Vityk =

Ukrainian politician

- Семен Вітик
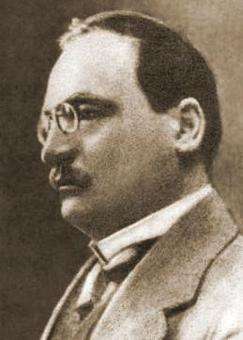

Deputy to Imperial Council
- In office 1907–1918

Personal details
- Born: February 21, 1875 Verkhni Hayi, Kingdom of Galicia and Lodomeria, Austria-Hungary (now Drohobych Raion, Lviv Oblast, Ukraine)
- Died: October 10, 1937 (aged 62) Verkhneuralsk, Chelyabinsk oblast, Russian SFSR, Soviet Union
- Party: Communist Party (Bolshevik) of Ukraine
- Other political affiliations: Ukrainian Social Democratic Labour Party; Ukrainian Social Democratic Party; Polish Social Democratic Party of Galicia; Ruthenian-Ukrainian Radical Party
- Occupation: Politician, editor, adminisrator

Vityk before his election to the Austrian parliament

Semen Hnatovych Vityk (Ukrainian: Семен Гнатович Вітик; 21 February 1875 – 10 October 1937) was a Ukrainian politician and trade union activist from Galicia. He was one of the founding members of the Ukrainian Social Democratic Party, and served as a deputy to the parliament of Cisleithania, a constituent part of Austria-Hungary. Vityk took senior positions in the administration of West Ukrainian and Ukrainian People's Republics before switching to the side of Soviet Ukraine. He was arrested and executed during the Great Purge.

== Biography ==
=== Early life and political career ===
Vityk was born on 21 February 1875 in Verkhni Hayi near Drohobych into the family of a railway worker. He started his studies at the Drohobych gymnasium, before transferring to study in Przemyśl. For his participation in a secret student society, Vityk was arrested and expelled from the Przemyśl gymnasium. Afterwards, he took part in the organization of a Ruthenian-Ukrainian Radical Party (RURP) cell in the village of Torky. During a visit to Lviv, in 1892 Vityk met one of the party's founders, Ivan Franko, and was eventually appointed the organization's secretary. In 1894 he was once again arrested while participating in a public demonstration in Przemyśl, and spent almost four months in prison. In October 1895 he underwent another arrest while campaigning for Franko during an early parliamentary election.

In 1896 Vityk joined Franko in Lviv, assisting him in the editing of the party newspaper. As the only representative of working class among RURP members, Vityk actively campaigned in Galicia, meeting with workers and peasants and promoting electoral, administrative and land reforms. This resulted in several new arrests by authorities. In June 1897 Vityk attended a congress of the Social Democratic Party of Austria in Vienna as part of the RURP delegation. In 1898 he attended the congress of Social Democratic Party of Galicia (SDPG) in Przemyśl.

=== Social Democratic leader in Galicia ===
A promoter of social democracy, in early 1899 Vityk left RURP and joined SDPG. In June of the same year he co-founded the Ukrainian Social Democratic Party of Galicia (USDP), becoming a member of its central committee. Despite this, in December he attended the RURP congress in Lviv. In 1902 Vityk was one of the organizers of a peasants' strike in Galicia, and in 1904 participated in a workers' strike in the Boryslav-Drohobych oil basin. In 1903 Vityk created the statute of USDP, which was adopted by the party's First Congress. In January 1906 he addressed the Second Congress of USDP, calling for organization of political struggle exclusively in legal ways. In June of the same year he published a popular brochure containing practical advice on organization of strikes. Vityk also authored a number of works in Polish language dedicated to social issues and Polish-Ukrainian relations. His political views at the time were significantly infleunced by Austromarxism.

Between 1907 and 1918 Vityk was a member of the Austrian Parliament. On that post he promoted schooling reform and supported the establishment of a Ukrainian university in Lviv. At the Third Congress of SDPU he proclaimed it necessary to establish Ukrainian trade unions and publish workers' press in Ukrainian language, while at the same time preserving good relations with Polish Social Democrats. After the congress, Vityk for a period of time headed the local committee of USDP in Lviv. Possessing great international authority, he represented USDP at congresses of Austrian Social Democrats and Second International.

However, Vityk's insistence on good relations with Polish Social Democrats made him an object of criticism from members of the younger generation in his party, such as Yulian Bachynsky. After the split of USDP in 1911, Vityk headed the internationalist fraction of the party, which preserved close ties with Polish Social Democracy. Following the beginning of World War I he remained in opposition to the new leadership of USDP, and refused to participate in the party's conference in 1917. He returned to active work in the party only in summer 1918. In October 1918 he called for the creation of a free and independent republic uniting all Ukrainian people in his speeches in Austrian parliament.

=== Career in West Ukrainian People's Republic and UPR ===
After the proclamation of West Ukrainian People's Republic, Vityk became a senior member of the Ukrainian National Council, and presided over the Labour Congress of Ukraine. On 4 January 1919 he was appointed a deputy of president Yevhen Petrushevych. Vityk opposed the terms of Union Treaty between Western Ukraine and Ukrainian People's Republic, which had been supported by members of the Ukrainian National Democratic Party, and called for the creation of a single Ukrainian Socialist-dominated government. This put him into opposition to Western Ukrainian authorities, who wanted to preserve their own autonomy and were characterized by Vityk as "reactionary" and "bourgeois". He supported close ties with Directorate members Volodymyr Chekhivsky, Borys Martos and Isaak Mazepa. On 10–12 January 1919 Vityk took part in the congress of Ukrainian Social Democratic Labour Party in Kyiv, which elected him and Osyp Bezpalko as members of its central committee.

Vityk as a member of the Ukrainian government in 1919

During the Polish-Ukrainian War Vityk served as district commissar of Drohobych, overseeing the local petroleum and salt production. On that post he opposed the sale of commodities to foreign states, which prevented the Ukrainian Galician Army from acquiring new weapons. The local citizens' militia controlled by Vityk opposed attempts by State Secretariat of West Ukrainian People's Republic to establish direct government control over the Drohobych area. This situation led to accusations of Bonapartism from Vityk's political opponents.

In March 1919 the government of Western Ukraine established its own administration in Drohobych district, and ordered the local militia to be transferred to the Polish front. However, on 14 April the militiamen began a mutiny and attacked the local military command, arresting several officers. After an unsuccessful attempt to capture Drohobych railway station, the mutineers started plundering the city, and were soon joined by poor peasants from surrounding areas. In order to suppress the revolt, authorities directed a battalion of Ukrainian Sich Riflemen, which entered Drohobych on 15 April and restored order, liberating the captured officers. Two participants of the mutiny were sentenced to death, but at least one of its leaders managed to escape during the subsequent retreat of Ukrainian troops. Vityk's complicity in the revolt could not be proven, and he publicly condemned the action, calling for the government to prevent "Bolshevik anarchy" in Ukraine.

Following the capture of Eastern Galicia by Poland in July 1919, Vityk moved to Kamianets-Podilsky, the temporary capital of Ukrainian People's Republic. On 4 July he was appointed Minister of Galician Affairs in the government of Ukrainian People's Republic. On that post Vityk promoted the figure of Directorate leader Symon Petliura and condemned the dictatorship of Yevhen Petrushevych, calling for the creation of a unified Ukrainian army.

=== Soviet service and repression ===
Cover of Nova Hromada magazine from 1923

After the dissolution of Ukrainian regular army in late 1919, Vityk emigrated to Vienna. There he adopted Sovietophile positions, opposing both Ukrainian governments and condemning Petliura for his agreement with Poland. In 1923-1925 he published the newspaper Nova Hromada, which voiced pro-Soviet positions. In 1925 he became a member of the Communist Party (Bolsheviks) of Ukraine. During the same year, he moved to Soviet Ukraine, settling in Kharkiv. Until 1927 Vityk served as an editor of a magazine published by the Ukrainian branch of International Red Aid. In 1927-1930 he was a board member of the State Publishing House of Ukraine, and in 1929-1931 served as secretary of the All-Ukrainian Society of Cultural Liaisons Abroad. In 1931-1933 Vityk was the deputy head of Istpart at the Central Committee of the Communist Party of Ukraine (Soviet Union). During that time he edited a book on Polish-Ukrainian relations and wrote memoirs about Ivan Franko.

On 22 March 1933 Vityk was arrested by the GPU of UkrSSR on accusations of participating in the "Ukrainian Military Organization". He was forced to confess his membership in that fictitious organization under torture. On 23 September 1933 a troika at the Collegium of GPU UkrSSR sentenced Vityk to 10 years of imprisonment in Verkhneuralsk (now in Chelyabinsk Oblast, Russia). While in prison, Vityk sent numerous complaints against poor treatment and abuse by guards to prison authorities. On 2 October 1937 a special NKVD troika sentenced him to death for "expression of counterrevolutionary views", "hostility towards party and government leadership" and violation of prison rules. On 10 October 1937 Vityk was executed by firing squad. On 4 July 1958 he was posthumously rehabilitated by the Military Tribunal of Kiev Military District. On 20 July 1990 Central Committee of the Communist Party of Ukraine posthumously rehabilitated Vityk as a party member.
