= Ukrainian Social Democratic Party (1899) =

Ukrainian Social Democratic Party Українська соціал-демократична партія
- Chairperson: Mykola Hankevych
- Founded: August 17, 1899
- Dissolved: September 1, 1939
- Split from: Ukrainian Radical Party; Polish Social Democratic Party of Galicia
- Succeeded by: Ukrainian Socialist Party (1950)
- Headquarters: Lviv
- Ideology: Austromarxism; Social democracy; Ukrainian nationalism
- International affiliation: Labour and Socialist International (1933-1939)
- Slogan: «Наша ціль є вільна держава українського люду — Українська Республіка» (English: "Our goal is a free state of the Ukrainian people - the Ukrainian Republic")

The Ukrainian Social Democratic Party (USDP; Ukrainian: Українська соціал-демократична партія, romanized: Ukrainska sotsial-demokratychna partiia) was a political party in Galicia and Bukovina. The party was founded in 1899 as an autonomous section the Galician Social Democratic Party in the Austrian 'Kingdom of Galicia and Lodomeria' and within the Duchy of Bukovina, but later split to become a separate party in 1907. The party was briefly in government during the brief West Ukrainian People's Republic (ZUNR) (1918–1919), before going into opposition. After the entirety of Galicia became incorporated into the Second Polish Republic, the party became part of the constitutional Ukrainian resistance to Polish rule before being banned and mostly being subsumed into other socialist movements.

== History ==
=== Section of the Galician Social Democratic Party under Austria ===
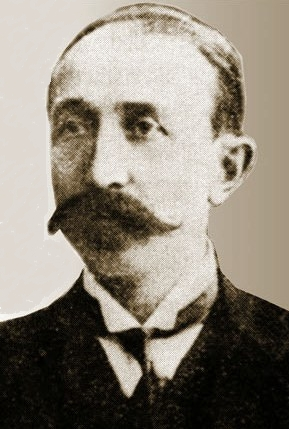
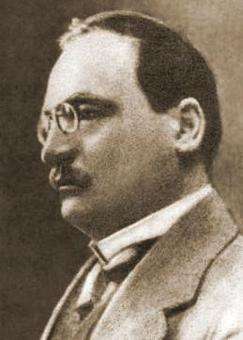
The party's original leaders (left to right): Mykola Hankevych and Semen Vityk

The Ukrainian Social Democratic Party emerged as a splinter group of the Ukrainian Radical Party. Its first congress took place in 1903 in Lviv and was presided by Mykola Hankevych and Semen Vityk. Until 1907 the party served as a section of the Polish Social Democratic Party of Galicia, itself a section of the Social Democratic Party of Austria. During that period Hankevych headed the Lviv city committee of the Social Democratic Party of Galicia. In 1906, the party was amalgamated with its affiliate in Bukovina, the Social Democratic Party of Bukovina, under its leader, Yosyp Bezpalko.

The Ukrainian Social Democratic Party had close ties to the Ukrainian Social Democratic Labour Party in Dnieper Ukraine, then ruled by the Russian Empire. The party was active in social agitation for the 1902 peasant strikes in Husyatyn and Terebovlia.

=== Separate party ===
In June 1907, under the pressure of a new generation of its members, the USDP officially seceded from Galician Social Democratic Party at a party conference. It was considered that split allowed the USDP "Liberty" (Volya) association to be more active in urban communities, where Ukrainians had been lesser in number. During the same year the party had two of its representatives elected to the Austrian parliament.

In 1911 an independentist fraction led by Lev Hankevych, Volodymyr Starosolsky, Porfyr Buniak and I. Kvasnytsia seceded from the party. The split continued until a party congress in March 1914. Also, in 1911, the party also had a representative, M. Khavryschuk, elected in the regional parliament of Bukovina.

In 1914 the party joined the Ukrainian General Council, and adopted a pro-Austrian position during the Great War.

Upon the dissolution of the Austria-Hungary in 1918, and the establishment of the West Ukrainian People's Republic, the party joined the Ukrainian National Council, the provisional parliament of the WUPR. Its member Antin Chernetskyi served as the State Secretary of Labour in the republic's government. However, in December 1918 the party left the governing coalition, creating the socialist opposition known as the Peasants and Workers Union.

According to the memoirs of Kyrylo Tryliovskyi, a personal acquaintance of WUPR's military secretary Dmytro Vitovsky, the party's militar leader Semen Vityk "sabotaged" exports of oil from the Drohobych oil region during the during the Polish-Ukrainian War (while it was under WUPR control) which led to the inability of Ukrainian forces to procure munitions. Vityk had been a militant leader whose radical faction within the Party, oriented towards independence, radicalism and general opposition to cooperation with the (Polish) PPSD and gained support in the local oil fields among Ukrainian workers, many recent arrivals from the local countryside, though in turn many of the local oilfield workers had not supported him due to their Polish identity. He would later join the pro-Soviet faction.

During 1919-1920 the party's representatives Volodymyr Temnytsky, Yosyp Bezpalko and Volodymyr Starosolsky served in the government of the Ukrainian People's Republic. In 1921 the part switched to a pro-Soviet line advocating unification with Soviet Ukraine, while being hostile to the Polish government as well as the government-in-exile of Yevhen Petrushevych. Some Volhynian USDP members were elected to the Sejm of Poland in 1922. By the early 1920s the party became infiltrated by members of the Communist Party of Western Ukraine (KPZU) and at its sixth Congress in Lviv in March 1923 changed its political platform to Communism, removing its older leaders including Mykola Hankevych.

The Polish authorities soon after, on January 30, 1924, outlawed the Party as a threat to peace and public order. After the ban, many members of the USDP cadre joined the already illegal KPZU. Others, who did not, instead became involved in the Workers Community public cultural and educational society. In 1928, the party was revived by Lev Hankevych's "Forward" (Vperid) group. In 1933 it joined the Labor and Socialist International and in December 1934 joined the Ukrainian Socialist Bloc that also included the Ukrainian National Democratic Alliance and the Ukrainian Socialist Radical Party.

The party ceased its activities following the outbreak of the Second World War. Its emigré members later united with other groups to create the Ukrainian Socialist Party.

== Ideology ==
The party supported the Ukrainian workers' movement and took part in strike actions in villages, contributing to the spread of pro-independence ideology among the youth. Ideologically the party initially had an Austro-Marxist orientation, but was increasingly subject to division over support for an independent Ukrainian state,. It advocated the creation of an independent Ukrainian state. Among prominent supporters of Ukrainian independence within the party were Volodymyr Levynsky and Yulian Bachynsky.

== Publications ==
The following publications served as the party's press organs:

- Volia (Ukrainian: Воля, romanized: Liberty; biweekly, 1900-1907);
- Zemlia i Volia (Ukrainian: Земля і воля, romanized: Land and Liberty; 1907-1912, 1919-1924);
- Vpered (Ukrainian: Вперед, romanized: Forward; 1912-1913, 1918-1924);
- Pratsia (Ukrainian: Праця, romanized: Labour).

== Election results ==
=== Austria-Hungary ===
House of Deputies
Year	Popular vote	%	Seats	Seat change	Government
1907	27,978	0,61%	2 / 516	+2	
1911	21,618	0,48%	1 / 516	-1	

=== Second Polish Republic ===
Sejm
Year	Popular vote	%	Seats	Seat change	Government	Notes
1922	?	?	2 / 444	new	opposition	As part of Bloc of National Minorities
1928	banned					
1930	banned					
1935	banned					
1938	banned					

== See also ==
- Social Democratic Party of Austria
- Polish Socialist Party
