= German Parliamentary Club =

German Parliamentary Club Polish: Niemiecki Klub Parlamentarny German: Deutscher Parlamentarischer Klub
- Leader: Eugen Naumann (1928–30); Eugen Franz (1930–35)
- Founded: 28 March 1928
- Dissolved: 1935
- Sejm: 19 / 444 (2nd); 5 / 444 (3rd)
- Senate: 5 / 111 (2nd); 3 / 111 (3rd)

The German Parliamentary Club (Polish: Niemiecki Klub Parlamentarny, German: Deutscher Parlamentarischer Klub, NKP) was an ethnic German parliamentary club in the second and third terms of the Sejm and Senate of the Second Polish Republic.

== History ==
Following the 1928 Polish parliamentary election, a total of 21 ethnically Germans were elected to the Sejm and 5 to the Senate. The German Parliamentary Club in the Sejm was formed on 28 March 1928 by 19 German members of the Sejm (posełs) elected on the lists of the Bloc of National Minorities, choosing Eugen Naumann as its chairman. In the Senate, all 5 Germans were elected on the lists of the Bloc of National Minorities, joining the NKP and choosing Erwin Hasbach as their chairman. Another two German posełs were elected on the list of the Polish Socialist Party, which, unlike the first term of the Sejm, did not join the main German club, forming their own Club of the Faction of German Socialist Deputies (Polish: Klub Frakcji Niemieckich Posłów Socjalistycznych). Of the 21 ethnically German posełs and 5 senators: 9 of the posełs and 2 senators belonged to the Deutsche Vereinigung im Sejm und Senat für Posen, Netzegau und Pommerellen, 4 posełs and 1 senator represented Catholic germans, 3 posełs and 1 senator were members of the German People's Union in Poland, 2 posełs belonged to the German Party and 1 represented the German socialist movement.

The NKP found itself with many experienced posełs and senators. Despite the political affiliation of some of its posełs with German nationalism, the NKP utilized legal means to defend the rights of the German minority, with the Ministry of Internal Affairs not finding the club of any statements of an anti-state character. Educational issues were a core matter in the work of the NKP, criticizing the state of German-language education in Poland. August Utta was the sole German to serve in the Sejm commission on education.

In the 1930 Polish parliamentary election, the NKP organized its own electoral bloc, the German Electoral Bloc (Polish: Niemiecki Blok Wyborczy, German: Deutscher Wahlblock, NBW). In the election, the NBW faced a minor rival list organized by the Sanation authorities, the Deutscher Unterstützugsverband in Polen, which ran in the Bydgoszcz constituency. Regardless, the splinter list's success was limited, receiving only 222 votes to the Sejm—0.2% of the total German vote. Ultimately, in the election, the NBW received 5 seats in the Sejm with 309,713 votes and 3 in the Senate with 236,471 votes. A key factor in the decline of seats for the Germans was the smaller amount of Polish lists, consolidating the Polish vote.

Following the election, the NKP was recreated in the Sejm and Senate, but with a significantly reduced representation, down to 5 posełs and 3 senators. Eugen Franz was selected as the chairman of the NKP.

As a result of the electoral law, the NKP was unable to contest the 1935 or 1938 parliamentary elections on its own list. As such, the NKP was not recreated after 1935.

== Club presidium ==
The presidium of the NKP club in the 2nd term Sejm was composed of:

- Eugen Naumann — Chairman
- Eugen Franz — Deputy Chairman
- August Utta — Deputy Chairman
- Kurt Graebe — Secretary

In the 3rd term Sejm:

- Eugen Franz — Chairman
- Kurt Graebe — Secretary
