= Hromadskyj Holos =

Hromadskyj Holos was a Ukrainian-language weekly newspaper published from Lviv. Hromadskyj Holos was the central organ of the Ukrainian Socialist-Radical Party.
