= Biechówko =

Biechówko refers to the following places in Poland:

- Biechówko, Greater Poland Voivodeship
- Biechówko, Kuyavian-Pomeranian Voivodeship
