= Belarusian Syalyanski Sayuz =

Belarusian Syalyanski Sayuz Polish: Białoruski Związek Włościański
- Abbreviation: BZW
- Founder: Bazyli Rogula; Wsiewaład Bildziukiewicz; Fabian Jeremicz; Bronisław Turonek
- Founded: 10 November 1925
- Dissolved: 1932
- Ideology: Peasant movement Autonomism
- Political position: Centre-left

The Belarusian Syalyanski Sayuz (Belarusian: Беларускі Сялянскі Саюз, Biełaruski Sialański Sajuz, Polish: Białoruski Związek Włościański, BZW) was a political party of the Belarusian minority active between 1925 and 1932 in the north-eastern territories of the Second Polish Republic. The organisation collaborated with Belarusian Christian Democratic Union. Its main activists included Fabian Jeremicz and Bazyli Rogula.

It was founded on 10 November 1925 by activists of the Social Democratic Party of Belarus — Bazyli Rogula, Wsiewaład Bildziukiewicz, Fabian Jeremicz, and Bronisław Turonek. The party became a member of the Belarusian Central Election Committee of the National Minorities Bloc (Polish: Białoruski Centralny Komitet Wyborczy Bloku Mniejszości Narodowych) together with Belarusian Christian Democrats and the Belarusian Orthodox Democratic Union (Polish: Prawosławne Białoruskie Zjednoczenie Demokratyczne).

It was considered centre-left, and espoused views similar to Christian democracy – it demanded autonomy for Belarusians living in Poland, the right to develop education and culture in Belarusian language, an end to the persecution of activists in the Belarusian national movement, the abolition of military settlements, the distribution of large estates among the peasants, freedom of religion, and a reduction in the burdens on the Belarusian peasantry. It referred to the traditions and ideology of the Polish peasant movement. It also supported Belarusian independence.

The party was a rival of the socialist Belarusian Peasants' and Workers' Union (Hramada). When Hramada was suppressed by the Polish government in 1927, BZW condemned Polish state repression, but ultimately was pleased by the fact that the Hramada's influence on the Belarusian community had been neutralized and sought to capitalize on this opportunity. Daniel Fedorowycz argued that the party "did not genuinely seek to defend the unified Belarusian front" because a unified front amongst Belarusian parties "did not exist due to the significant difference in social programs."

In 1922, the party's future co-founders partook the Bloc of National Minorities, and in the 1922 Polish legislative election, the party's co-founder Fabian Jeremicz won a seat from its electoral list as the sole representative of the Belarusian minority. In 1926, party's representatives visited the Soviet Union. In the 1928 Polish legislative election, the party officially ran as part of the Bloc of National Minorities. In the 1930 Polish legislative election, the party's co-founder Fabian Jeremicz won a seat from the electoral list of the Ukrainian and Belarusian Electoral Bloc.

== See also ==
- Belarusian Socialist Assembly
- Brotherhood of Belarusian Peasants

== Bibliography ==
- Garlicki A., Landau Z., Roszkowski W., Stawecki P., Tomaszewski J. (red. red.) "Encyklopedia historii II Rzeczypospolitej", Warszawa 1999, ISBN 83-214-1101-0
