= Ukrainian and Belarusian Electoral Bloc =

Ukrainian and Belarusian Electoral Bloc: Ukraiński i Białoruski Blok Wyborczy (Polish); Український і білоруський виборчий блок (Ukrainian)
- Preceded by: Bloc of National Minorities
- Members: Ukrainian National Democratic Alliance; Ukrainian Socialist-Radical Party; Ukrainian Social Democratic Party; Belarusian Christian Democracy; Belarusian Syalyanski Sayuz

The Ukrainian and Belarusian Electoral Bloc (Polish: Ukraiński i Białoruski Blok Wyborczy, Ukrainian: Український і білоруський виборчий блок, UBBW) was an ethnic Ukrainian and Belarusian electoral bloc for the 1930 Polish parliamentary election.

== History ==
On 30 August 1930, the Ukrainian National Democratic Alliance (UNDO) decided to contest the upcoming 1930 Polish parliamentary election, and reach out to the Ukrainian social democratic parties, the Ukrainian Socialist-Radical Party and Ukrainian Social Democratic Party, with the two parties signing an agreement to establish an electoral bloc on 18 September. Two Belarusian parties also joined the bloc, with the Belarusian Christian Democracy and the Belarusian Syalyanski Sayuz running on its lists. The decision to form a bloc was motivated by the escalating tensions in Eastern Galicia before the election, allowing the UNDO and social democrats to overcome their ideological differences. Participating parties appealed to minorities to vote for the Bloc to defend "national rights and social rights". The majority of seats won by the bloc were won by the UNDO.

== Electoral results ==
=== Sejm ===
Election year	# of votes	% of vote	# of overall seats won	Government
1930	725,984	6.41 (#4)	21 / 444	BBWR

=== Senate ===
Election	# of votes	% of votes	# of overall seats won
1930	434,042	6.39 (#4)	4 / 111
