= Ukrainian Radical Party =

Ukrainian Radical Party Українська радикальна партія
- Founder: Ivan Franko (Note: co-founder and first leader)
- Founded: 5 October 1890 (136 years, 7 days)
- Dissolved: 26 March 1950 (76 years, 200 days)
- Split from: Narodovtsi
- Merged into: Ukrainian Socialist Party
- Headquarters: Lviv
- Ideology: Agrarian socialism Anti-clericalism; Ukrainian nationalism
- Political position: Left-wing
- International affiliation: Labour and Socialist International

The Ukrainian Radical Party (URP) (Ukrainian: Українська радикальна партія, УPП, Ukraiinska Radykalna Partiia), founded in October 1890 as Ruthenian-Ukrainian Radical Party and based on the radical movement in western Ukraine dating from the 1870s, was the first modern Ukrainian political party with a defined program, mass following, and registered membership. It advocated socialism, increased rights for Ukrainian peasants, anti-clericalism and secularism.

== Programme and ideology ==
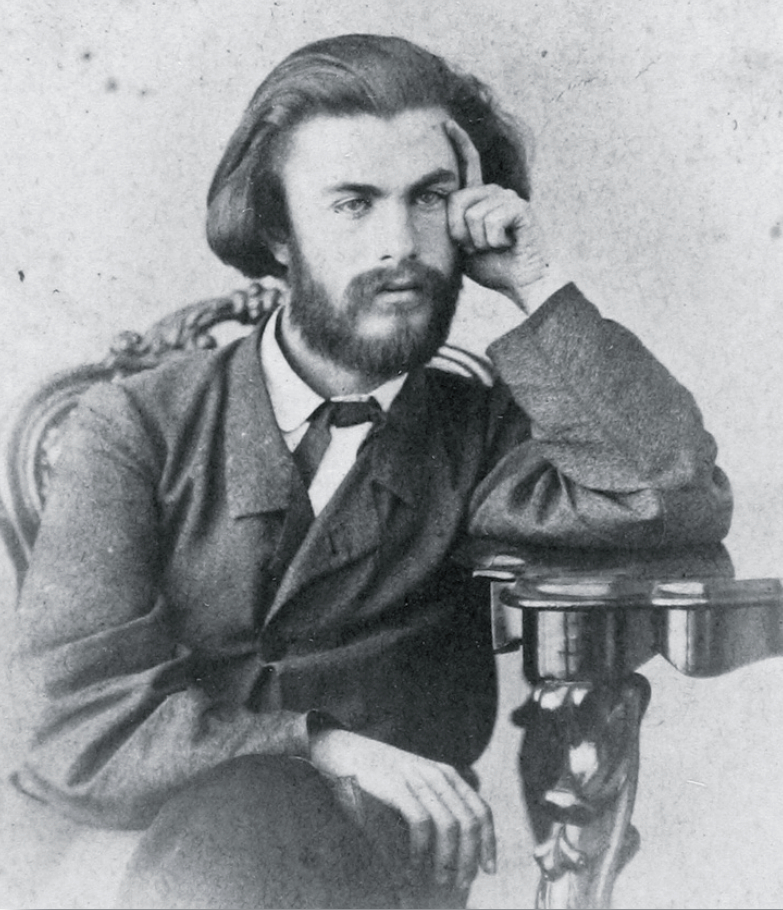
Mykhailo Drahomanov, whose political ideas formed the basis of the Ukrainian Radical Party's ideology

The Radical Party ideology was based on the political thought of Mykhailo Drahomanov, an eastern Ukrainian thinker who spent part of the nineteenth century in western Ukraine. Although the Radical party advocated socialism in its ideology, it considered itself different from western socialists who were beholden to the ideas of Karl Marx because western socialism was based on the industrial proletariat while the Radical party was focused on the peasantry. Accordingly, its socialism was agrarian and peasant-based. The Ukrainian Radical party claimed kinship and affinity with the similarly peasant-based socialist Serbian Radical Party of the late nineteenth and early twentieth centuries. It actively opposed the influence of the Ukrainian Greek Catholic Church and its priests in Ukrainian society. It was also opposed to the Austrian government, to mainstream Ukrainophiles who were loyal to Austria, and to Ukrainian attempts to cooperate with the generally Polish authorities of Galicia, the same time, the URP attempted with Polish workers and peasant movements. The URP supported Ukrainian independence at a party congress in 1895, the first time that the goal of an independent Ukrainian state had been expressed anywhere. Involved with the plight of the Ukrainian peasants, the URP also called for and organized strikes of Ukrainian agricultural workers.

== History ==
The Radical Party was founded in Lviv on October 4, 1890, by a group of Ukrainian activists including the poet Ivan Franko, the publisher Mykhailo Pavlyk, and others. It was involved in founding reading rooms and cooperatives, organizing women's groups, and training and politicizing Ukrainian peasants. In 1895, the party passed a resolution calling for Ukrainian independence. That same year, it sent three representatives to the Galician Diet and in 1897 two representatives to the Austrian parliament.

In the mid-1890s three competing groups emerged within the URP. One maintained its allegiance to the traditional ideology of the URP. Another faction turned more to western European socialism and Marxism. A third faction which included most of the Radical Party's most prominent members such as Ivan Franko became increasingly disenchanted with socialist ideas and more focussed on national concerns. In 1899 the latter two groups left the Radical Party. The socialist-learning faction split off to form the Ukrainian Social Democratic Party. The nationalist-leading faction merged with mainstream Ukrainiphiles to create the National Democratic Party, which was the largest Ukrainian political party in Austrian-ruled Ukraine before and during the First World War. The National Democratic party, renamed the Ukrainian National Democratic Alliance, would continue to dominate western Ukrainian political life until the Second World War.

After the exodus of the Ukrainian Social Democrats and the National Democrats, the remaining Ukrainian Radical Party, having become a definitively peasant-oriented party, was the second largest political party among ethnic Ukrainians in western Ukraine. In 1911, it sent five members to the Austrian parliament and in 1913 six members to the Galician Diet. On the eve of World War I, the Radical party established sporting societies and paramilitary groups that would serve as the basis for the Ukrainian Sich Riflemen, an all-Ukrainian unit within the Austrian army.

The Ukrainian Radical Party was one of the founding parties of the West Ukrainian National Republic, and its members occupied the posts of defence minister (Dmytro Vitovsky) and interior secretary within the West Ukrainian government. Following the war, the territory up to the Zbruch river became part of the Polish state with the Treaty of Riga. At its Party Congress in 1925, the Radical Party passed a resolution simultaneously opposing cooperation with Ukrainian "bourgeois parties" and condemning Bolsheviks policies in Soviet Ukraine. A year later, it merged with a socialist party and renamed itself the Ukrainian Socialist Radical Party (USRP). In the 1928 Polish elections, the party received 280,000 votes, the second most among western Ukrainian parties following the Ukrainian National Democratic Alliance's 600,000 votes. This enabled the USRP to send 11 representatives into the Sejm and 3 into the Senate. In the 1930 elections it ran as part of the Ukrainian and Belarusian Electoral Bloc with the Ukrainian National Democratic Alliance, obtaining 3 seats. The USRP boycotted all subsequent Polish elections.

The party was a member of the Labour and Socialist International between 1931 and 1940.

After the Soviets annexed western Ukrainian territory in 1939, the USRP like all other western Ukrainian political parties was forced by the Soviet authorities to disband. Members of the party supported the Ukrainian national government of 1941 and two of its leaders (Volodymyr Lysy and Konstantyn Pankivsky) had positions in it as Minister and Deputy Minister of the Interior. The government was quickly disbanded by the Germans.

In 1946 the USRP was re-established in exile and in 1948 it took part in the establishment of the Ukrainian National Rada in exile. In 1950, the party merged with the Ukrainian Social Democratic Labour Party and the Ukrainian Socialist-Revolutionary Party into the Ukrainian Socialist Party.

== Elections ==
=== Austria-Hungary ===
House of Deputies
Year	Popular vote	%	Seats	Seat change	Government
1897	6,020	0.57%	1 / 425	new	
1901	4,407	0.41%	2 / 425	+1	
1907	105,118	2,28%	5 / 516	+3	
1911	54,701	1.21%	5 / 516	0	

=== Second Polish Republic ===
Sejm
Year	Popular vote	%	Seats	Seat change	Government	Notes
1922	boycotted					
1928	268,677	2.36%	9 / 444	new	opposition	In bloc with USDP
1930	725,984	6.41%	21 / 444	+12	opposition	In bloc with UNDO and Belarusian parties
1935	boycotted					
1938	boycotted					

Senate
Year	Popular vote	%	Seats	Seat change	Government	Notes
1922	boycotted					
1928	148,431	2,32%	1 / 111	new	opposition	In bloc with USDP
1930	434,042	6.39%	4 / 111	+3	opposition	In bloc with UNDO and Belarusian parties
1935	boycotted					
1938	boycotted					

== See also ==
- Ukrainian National Democratic Alliance
