= Gorzyce, Września County =

Gorzyce
- Village
- Location within Poland
- Coordinates: 52°13′N 17°34′E
- Country: Poland
- Voivodeship: Greater Poland
- County: Września
- Gmina: Miłosław

Gorzyce [ɡɔˈʐɨt͡sɛ] is a village in the administrative district of Gmina Miłosław, within Września County, Greater Poland Voivodeship, in west-central Poland.
