= Bugaj, Września County =

Bugaj
- Village
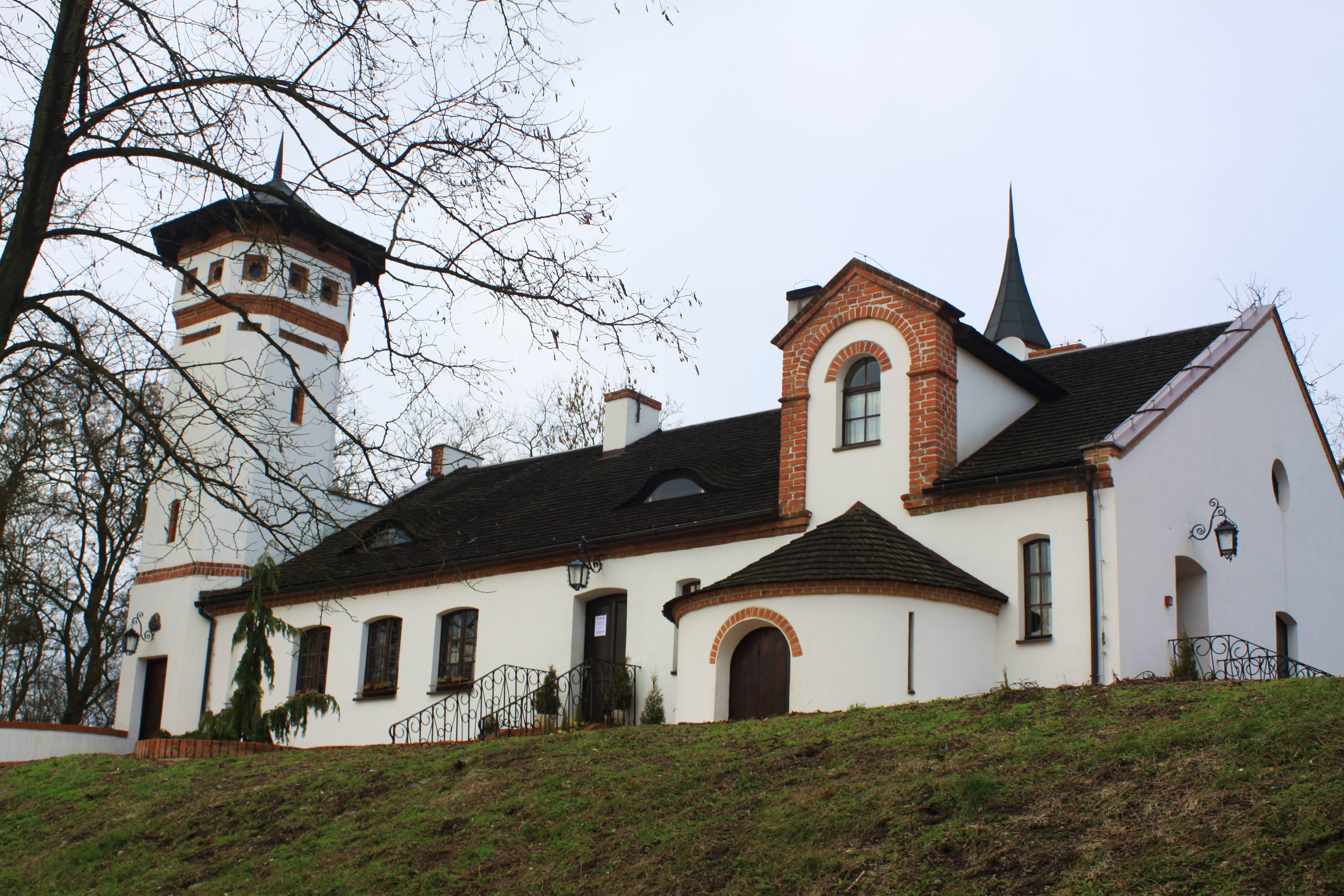
- Historic hunting lodge Bażantarnia in Bugaj

- Location within Poland
- Coordinates: 52°12′N 17°30′E
- Country: Poland
- Voivodeship: Greater Poland
- County: Września
- Gmina: Miłosław
- Population: 22
- Time zone: UTC+1 (CET)
  - Summer (DST): UTC+2 (CEST)

Bugaj [ˈbuɡai̯] is a village in the administrative district of Gmina Miłosław, within Września County, Greater Poland Voivodeship, in west-central Poland.

The name Bugaj comes from the Polish name Boży Gaj ("God's Grove"), and refers to a former place of shelter during foreign invasions and a former Slavic pagan temple. A Polish insurgent unit was stationed in the village during the Greater Poland uprising (1848) against Prussia, and a battle was fought there.

During the German occupation of Poland (World War II), on 20 November 1939, the Germans carried out an execution of three Poles, inhabitants of Izbica Kujawska and Koło, in the village (see Nazi crimes against the Polish nation).
