= Socialists' Bloc =

Socialists' Bloc Blok Socjalistów (Polish)
- Leader: Józef Janta; Piotr Sowa
- Ideology: Socialism
- Political position: Left-wing
- Members: Polish Socialist Party; German Social Democratic Worker's Party

The Socialists' Bloc (Polish: Blok Socjalistów) was a political coalition of left-wing parties oriented around the Polish Socialist Party. It operated in the Silesian Voivodeship during the 1930 Polish parliamentary election and in the November 1930 Silesian Parliament election, where it lost two seats. The Bloc united the Polish and German left in Silesia, although the two had already loosely cooperated beforehand.
