= Yulian Bachynsky =

Ukrainian diplomat

- Юліан Бачинський
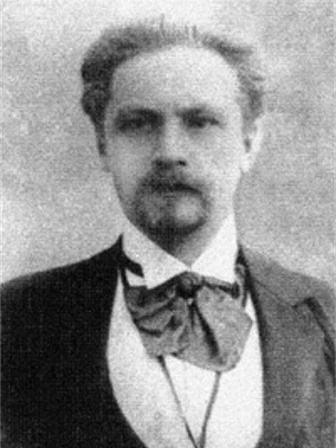

The head of the diplomatic mission of Ukraine to the United States
- In office 1919–1921
- President: Symon Petliura

Personal details
- Born: March 28, 1870 Novosilka, Kingdom of Galicia and Lodomeria, Austria-Hungary (now in Ternopil Oblast, Ukraine)
- Died: June 6, 1940 (aged 70) Karelia or Leningrad Oblast, Russian SFSR, Soviet Union
- Party: Ukrainian Social Democratic Party
- Other political affiliations: Ruthenian-Ukrainian Radical Party
- Education: Lviv University

Yulian Oleksandrovych Bachynsky (Ukrainian: Юліан (Юліян) Олександрович Бачинський; born March 28, 1870, Novosilka, Ternopil region – 6 June 1940, Republic of Karelia / Leningrad region) was a Ukrainian civic activist, publicist, diplomat and politician. He is best known for his 1895 work Ukraina Irredenta, which has been described as a manifesto of Ukrainian national independence. During the Ukrainian War of Independence, Bachynsky served as Ukraine's diplomatic representative in the United States.

== Biography ==
Yulian Bachynsky was born on 28 March 1870 in Novosilka, Galicia, Austria-Hungary to Ukrainian Greek Catholic Church priest Oleksandr Bachynsky (1844–1933) and Yevhenia Fylypovska (?–1874). His father served as the rector of Lviv theological seminary. The Bachynsky family was of noble origin and belonged to Sas coat of arms.

Bachynsky studied in a Lviv gymnasium where lessons were taught in German. After graduating from the Lviv Academic Gymnasium in 1890, he enrolled into Lviv University's law school. After graduating with a degree in law, he embarked on a political and journalistic career.

Bachynsky joined the Radical Party in 1890, where he led its social-democratic wing. Under his influence, in 1895 the party adopted demands of political independence for Ukrainians as part of its program. In 1899 he became one of the co-founders of the Ukrainian Social Democratic Party, and served as its head until 1914. In 1918 Bachynsky served as a member of the Ukrainian National Council of the West Ukrainian People's Republic.

In 1919 he headed the Ukrainian delegation in Washington, serving as a diplomatic representative of the Ukrainian People's Republic. After the failure of his diplomatic mission in the United States, he stayed in Austria and Germany, and then decided to move to the USSR. In November 1933, together with his daughter Olena, Bachynsky arrived to Kharkiv, where he edited the Ukrainian Soviet Encyclopedia until his arrest on the trumped-up charge of membership in the Union for the Liberation of Ukraine one year later.

Sentenced to a ten-year term, Bachynsky was imprisoned in the Solovki prison camp. According to the newspaper Krakivski Visti, being a Polish citizen, he stayed in the camp following its official disbandment, being kept in a high-security cell for foreign subjects. He died in 1940 in the Republic of Karelia.

== Political views ==
Influenced by the ideas of Marx and Engels, Bachynsky established a Marxist current in Ukrainian political thought, using socioeconomic analysis to back the idea of Ukrainian independence. According him, the economic backwardness of Ukrainians in Galicia was a result of imperial subjugation, and could only be overcome through national liberation. He praised the Constitution of the Soviet Union as a guarantee of sovereign rights for separate Soviet republics, which contributed to his fatal decision to settle in Soviet Ukraine.

== Notable publications ==
Bachynsky is known as the author of Ukraina Irredenta (1895) - a book in which he called for Ukraine to become an independent state. Bachynsky also authored several other books, including Partition of Galicia (Поділ Галичини, 1897), Ukrainian Immigration in the United States of America (Українська імміґрація в З’єдинених Державах Америки, 1914) and Bolshevik Revolution and Ukrainians (Большевицька революція і українці, 1928).

== Legacy ==
The influence of Ukraina Irredenta on educated Ukrainian youth in Eastern Galicia was compared by contemporaries to the effect produced by works of Taras Shevchenko and Ivan Franko. Under the Soviet regime, Bachynsky's work was ignored due to its contradiction with Marxism-Leninism, meanwhile in the Ukrainian diaspora only separate passages of Ukraina Irredenta were publicized after 1924. Following the Ukraine's independence, Bachynsky's contribution to Ukrainian political thought has been largely ignored due to his association with left-wing positions. The only publication of Ukraina Irredenta in independent Ukraine was made in 2003 by the publishing house of the Social Democratic Party of Ukraine (united).
