= Bagatelka, Greater Poland Voivodeship =

Bagatelka
- Village
- Location within Poland
- Coordinates: 52°11′30″N 17°29′14″E
- Country: Poland
- Voivodeship: Greater Poland
- County: Września
- Gmina: Miłosław

Bagatelka [baɡaˈtɛlka] is a village in the administrative district of Gmina Miłosław, within Września County, Greater Poland Voivodeship, in west-central Poland.
