= Lipie, Września County =

Lipie
- Village
- Location within Poland
- Coordinates: 52°13′20″N 17°31′30″E
- Country: Poland
- Voivodeship: Greater Poland
- County: Września
- Gmina: Miłosław

Lipie [ˈlipjɛ] is a village in the administrative district of Gmina Miłosław, within Września County, Greater Poland Voivodeship, in west-central Poland.
