= Czeszewo-Budy =

- Village
- Location within Poland
- Coordinates: 52°09′20″N 17°31′35″E
- Country: Poland
- Voivodeship: Greater Poland
- County: Września
- Gmina: Miłosław

Czeszewo-Budy [t͡ʂɛˈʂɛvɔ ˈbudɨ] is a village in the administrative district of Gmina Miłosław, within Września County, Greater Poland Voivodeship, in west-central Poland.
