= State Publishing House of Ukraine =

Publishing house in the Ukrainian SSR

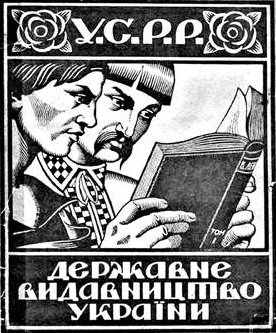
- Native name: Державне видавництво України
- Industry: Publishing house
- Founded: May 19, 1919
- Defunct: August 21, 1930
- Successor: State Publishing Union of Ukraine
- Headquarters: Kiev (1919–1922), Kharkov (1922–1930), Ukrainian SSR

The State Publishing House of Ukraine (Russian: Государственное издательство Украины or Госиздат Украины, romanized: Gosizdat Ukrainy; Ukrainian: Державне видавництво України, abbreviated 'Держвидав' or 'ДВУ', romanized: Derzhvydav or DVU) was a publishing house in the Ukrainian Soviet Socialist Republic that existed from 1919 to 1930. During the 1920s, it was the most prominent literary publisher in the Ukrainian SSR, publishing many books of different kinds in the Ukrainian language.

== Vseukrvydav (1919–1920) ==
The publishing house was founded as the All-Ukrainian Publishing House (Russian: Всеукраинское издательство, romanized: Vseukrainskoye izdatel'stvo, abbreviated 'Всеукриздат', Vseukrizdat in Russian; Ukrainian: Всеукраїнське видавництво, abbreviated 'Всеукрвидав' or 'Всевидав', Vseukrvydav or Vsevydav in Ukrainian), being set up in Kyiv on May 5, 1919, following a decree of the All-Ukrainian Central Executive Committee which ordered the merger of all soviet publishing houses into a single entity. Vseukrvydav was given monopoly on printing activities. Vseukrvydav was placed in charge of regulation of the publishing activities of scientific, cooperative, military, and literary organizations and associations, and it held the power to determine the number of publications and their circulation and was in charge of distributing paper for publishing activities. Branches of Vseukrvydav were set up in Kiev, Kharkov, Volyn', Poltava and other locations.

By October 1919 the Vseukrvydav became defunct as Ukraine came under the control of the forces of General Anton Denikin. Vseukrvydav resumed activities in December 1919, being managed under the All-Ukrainian Revolutionary Committee. Vseukrvydav published the arts journal Mystetstvo during a short period.

== Vseukrderzhvydav (1920–1922) ==
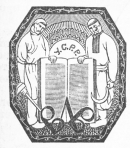
All-Ukrainian State Publishing House symbol

A decree issued by the All-Ukrainian Central Executive Committee on August 18, 1920, renamed the entity as All-Ukrainian State Publishing House (Russian: Всеукраинское государственное издательство, abbreviated 'Всеукргосиздат', Vseukrgosizdat, Ukrainian: Всеукраїнське державне видавництво, abbreviated 'Всеукрдержвидав', Vseukrderzhvydav or VDV). Vseukrderzhvydav was controlled by the Presidium of the All-Ukrainian Central Executive Committee. In May 1921, the publishing house was placed under the management of the People's Commissariat for Education of the Ukrainian SSR.

== From khozraschet to Ukrainization ==
In 1922, the entity was renamed the State Publishing House of Ukraine, in line with a reorganization occurring following decisions by the Central Committee of the Communist Party (Bolsheviks) of Ukraine and the Council of People's Commissars of the Ukrainian SSR. Publishing activities would have to conform to self-financing and accountability of allocated capital (khozraschet). The erstwhile branches of the All-Ukrainian State Publishing House were converted into bookstores or trade offices.

From August 1922 onward, the headquarters of the State Publishing House of Ukraine was located in Kharkiv, albeit the company had representative offices in other Ukrainian cities. Moreover, the company had representation offices in Moscow and Leningrad. Several other publishing houses existed alongside DVU in the Ukrainian SSR; by 1922–1923, there were 49 publishing houses in the republic: 23 state-owned, ten belonging to cooperatives, four belonging to party organs, five to trade unions, and seven private.

DVU printed many books in the Ukrainian language, such as textbooks, series of classics, and translations of Western European literature. It also published some technical literature. DVU published almanacs and magazines such as Pluh, Hart, Chervonyi Shliakh, Zhyttya y revolyutsiya, Kritika and Krasne Slovo. Ukrainian writers working for DVU included Vasyl Ellan-Blakytny, Ivan Bagmut, Maik Yohansen, Volodmyr Koriak, Sergey Pilipenko and Pavlo Tychyna.

During the first years after the 1922 reorganization, DVU struggled to stay afloat, as resources allocated by the Moscow Centre to DVU in terms of the printing press and paper resources were meager. In 1923 DVU published 2.2 million books in Ukrainian language and 1.5 million school primers. Furthermore, in 1923, DVU published a new edition of Mykhailo Kotsiubynsky's works, a Ukrainian-language translation of Vladimir Korolenko's works, two dictionaries, a series of popular theatrical books and a peasants wall calendar. In the first 11 months of 1924, 67 percent of the works published by DVU were in the Ukrainian language.

In 1925, the Soviet Union government began sending DVU economic support, allocating 10 percent of the all-Union budget for publishing activities to Ukraine. The allocated resources were insufficient to meet its needs. In 1925, the financial crisis of DVU reached a point where the entity stopped paying royalties to its writers. DVU had to prioritize printing of school textbooks, with some 80 percent of its printed material being allocated to the education sector. For the 1924–1925 school year, DVU printed 105 school textbooks and 37 teacher instruction books. As of 1925, DVU also supplied five textbooks each for the Yiddish, German, and Polish schools in the Ukrainian SSR, three for the Bulgarian schools, and two for the Moldavian schools. But the number of printed textbooks did not meet the demand, and schools outside of larger cities often had difficulties acquiring them.

As DVU mainly printed textbooks, there was a large unmet demand for Ukrainian-language fictional prose literature. Belles-lettres literary works published by DVU would sell out in about half the usual press run of one and a half years for its Soviet counterparts. This was despite the higher prices of DVU literature compared to general Soviet literature.

In 1927, Mykola Skrypnyk became the People's Commissar for Education of the Ukrainian SSR, and after taking office, Skrypnyk pushed for a new round of 'Ukrainization'. With Skrypnyk as the Education Commissar several new literary and cultural publications were launched, such as Nova Generatsiia and Avangard almanakh which were published by DVU. By the late 1920s, DVU was the largest publisher in Ukraine, and the second-largest publisher in the Soviet Union. In 1929–1930, DVU published an 18-volume translation of the Works of Émile Zola.

DVU literature was distributed by the Ukrainian Book Distribution Center (Ukrknigotsentr), a body that organized deliveries of literature to trade unions, factory reading rooms, collective farms, and raion-level libraries.

== Merger into DVOU ==
The publishing activities in the Ukrainian SSR were reorganized in 1930 amid a crackdown on nationalist tendencies. On August 21, 1930, by the decision of the Council of People's Commissars of the Ukrainian SSR, DVU was replaced by the State Publishing Union of Ukraine (DVOU), which was formed through the merger of ten publishing houses.

== See also ==
- Gosizdat
- Ukrderzhnatsmenvydav
