= Nowa Wieś Podgórna =

- Village
- Location within Poland
- Coordinates: 52°10′N 17°36′E
- Country: Poland
- Voivodeship: Greater Poland
- County: Września
- Gmina: Miłosław

Nowa Wieś Podgórna [ˈnɔva ˈvjɛɕ pɔdˈɡurna] is a village in the administrative district of Gmina Miłosław, within Września County, Greater Poland Voivodeship, in west-central Poland.
