= Gmina Miłosław =

Gmina Miłosław Miłosław Commune
- Gmina
- Coat of arms
- Interactive map of Gmina Miłosław
- Coordinates (Miłosław): 52°12′24″N 17°28′59″E
- Country: Poland
- Voivodeship: Greater Poland
- County: Września
- Seat: Miłosław

Area
  - Total: 132.26 km^{2} (51.07 sq mi)

Population (2006)
  - Total: 10,266
  - Density: 77.620/km^{2} (201.03/sq mi)
  - Urban: 3,589
  - Rural: 6,677
- Website: http://www.miloslaw.info/

Gmina Miłosław is an urban-rural gmina (administrative district) in Września County, Greater Poland Voivodeship, in west-central Poland. Its seat is the town of Miłosław, which lies approximately 16 kilometres (10 mi) south-west of Września and 45 km (28 mi) south-east of the regional capital Poznań.

The gmina covers an area of 132.26 square kilometres (51.1 sq mi), and as of 2006 its total population is 10,266 (out of which the population of Miłosław amounts to 3,589, and the population of the rural part of the gmina is 6,677).

== Villages ==
Apart from the town of Miłosław, Gmina Miłosław contains the villages and settlements of Bagatelka, Białe Piątkowo, Biechówko, Biechowo, Bugaj, Chlebowo, Chrustowo, Czeszewo, Czeszewo-Budy, Franulka, Gorzyce, Kębłowo, Kozubiec, Książno, Lipie, Mikuszewo, Nowa Wieś Podgórna, Pałczyn, Rudki, Skotniki and Szczodrzejewo.

== Neighbouring gminas ==
Gmina Miłosław is bordered by the gminas of Dominowo, Kołaczkowo, Krzykosy, Nowe Miasto nad Wartą, Środa Wielkopolska, Września and Żerków.
