= Novosilka, Pidhaitsi urban hromada, Ternopil Raion, Ternopil Oblast =

Village in Ternopil Oblast, Ukraine

Novosilka Новосілка
- Location in Ternopil Oblast Novosilka (Ukraine)
- Coordinates: 49°18′32″N 25°10′37″E
- Country: Ukraine
- Oblast: Ternopil Oblast
- Raion: Ternopil Raion
- Hromada: Pidhaitsi Hromada
- Postal code: 48012

Novosilka (Ukrainian: Новосілка) is a village in Pidhaitsi urban hromada, Ternopil Raion, Ternopil Oblast, Ukraine.

== History ==
The first written mention is from 1421.

After the liquidation of the Pidhaitsi Raion on 19 July 2020, the village became part of the Ternopil Raion.

== Religion ==
UGCC churches:

- Nativity of the Blessed Virgin Mary (1709, Lenchivka)
- Introduction to the Church of the Blessed Virgin Mary (1903, stone, Tesarivka)
- Saint Nicholas (1935, Kut)

== Notable people ==
- Yulian Bachynsky (1870–1940), Ukrainian politician, publicist and diplomat.
