= Kębłowo, Września County =

Kębłowo
- Village
- Location within Poland
- Coordinates: 52°13′N 17°30′E
- Country: Poland
- Voivodeship: Greater Poland
- County: Września
- Gmina: Miłosław

Kębłowo [kɛmˈbwɔvɔ] is a village in the administrative district of Gmina Miłosław, within Września County, Greater Poland Voivodeship, in west-central Poland.
