= Chrustowo, Września County =

Chrustowo
- Village
- Location within Poland
- Coordinates: 52°11′43″N 17°33′37″E
- Country: Poland
- Voivodeship: Greater Poland
- County: Września
- Gmina: Miłosław

Chrustowo [xrusˈtɔvɔ] is a village in the administrative district of Gmina Miłosław, within Września County, Greater Poland Voivodeship, in west-central Poland.
