= Kozubiec =

- Village
- Location within Poland
- Coordinates: 52°11′N 17°31′E
- Country: Poland
- Voivodeship: Greater Poland
- County: Września
- Gmina: Miłosław
- Population: 100

Kozubiec [kɔˈzubjɛt͡s] is a village in the administrative district of Gmina Miłosław, within Września County, Greater Poland Voivodeship, in west-central Poland.
