= Franulka =

- Village
- Location within Poland
- Coordinates: 52°12′1″N 17°31′23″E
- Country: Poland
- Voivodeship: Greater Poland
- County: Września
- Gmina: Miłosław

Franulka [fraˈnulka] is a village in the administrative district of Gmina Miłosław, within Września County, Greater Poland Voivodeship, in west-central Poland.
