= Yosyp Bezpalko =

Ukrainian politician and writer (1881–1950)

- Йосип Безпалко
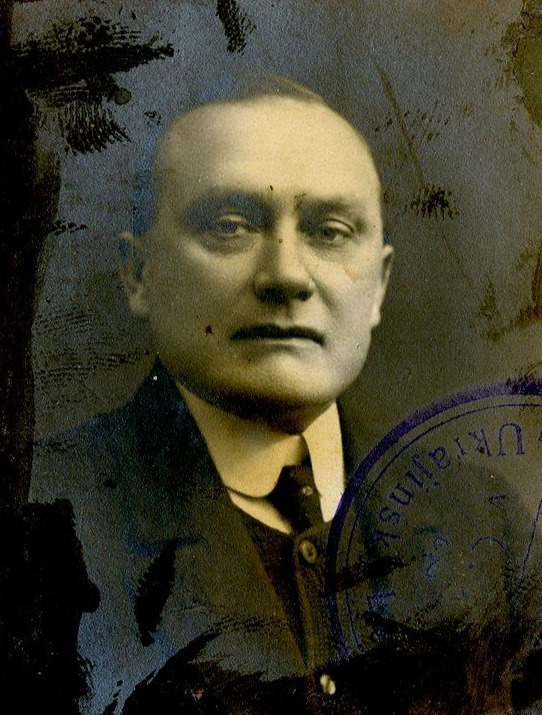

Mayor of Chernivtsi
- In office November 1918 – ?
- Preceded by: Salo Weisselberger
- Succeeded by: Gheorghe Șandru

Personal details
- Born: 1881 Czernowitz, Galicia-Lodomeria, Austria-Hungary (now Chernivtsi, Ukraine)
- Died: 1950 (aged 68–69) Kazakh SSR, Soviet Union (now Kazakhstan)
- Party: Ukrainian Social Democratic Party; Ukrainian Social Democratic Labour Party

Yosyp Ivanovych Bezpalko (Ukrainian: Йосип Іванович Безпалко; 1881 – 1950) was a Ukrainian politician and writer from Northern Bukovina.

== Biography ==
He was born in Chernivtsi, Northern Bukovina to a poor middle-class family.

Due to political activity, he was expelled from the gymnasium. In 1899, he founded a secret group of high school and student youth. From 1901 to 1902 he edited the Bukovina newspaper, a body of the Bukovinian national organization. In 1903, he began teaching. Founder of one of the first Sich societies (which promoted physical education and fire-fighting organization) in Bukovina and editor of the teacher's magazine Promin (1903). From 1907 to 1908 he was the regional secretary of the Bukovina trade unions.

From 1907 to 1914 Bezpalko was the founder and chairman of the regional organization of the Ukrainian Social Democratic Party (USDP) in Bukovina, and from 1908 to 1914 he was the editor of a local party body, the Borba newspaper. He was the chairman of the educational commission in the camp for Ukrainian prisoners of war in Rastatt, Germany.

Bezpalko was a delegate of the Ukrainian National Council of the Western Ukrainian People's Republic from the Ukrainian Social Democratic Labour Party from 1918 to 1919. He was later part of the Labor Congress, and from November 1918 he was Mayor of Chernivtsi. He disagreed with Semen Vityk, who was supported by Symon Petliura, on the reorganization of the system of public administration under the leadership of Yevhen Petrushevych, leader of the WUPR. He was Minister of Labor in the governments of Borys Martos and Isaak Mazepa from 1919 to 1920.

Bezpalko. was arrested by the Polish government on 11 February 1920 in Kamianets-Podilskyi, alongside fellow UPR government officials Isaak Mazepa, Andriy Livytskyi, and Ivan Ohienko in accordance with the order of the Polish Chief Commissioner of Volhynia and the Podolsk Front A. Minkevych. An official apology for the "unfortunate case" of the arrest was issued by the Polish Foreign Ministry on March 11 to the Ukrainian diplomatic mission in Warsaw.

In 1920 he emigrated to Czechoslovakia, where he taught German at the Ukrainian Academy of Economics in Poděbrady. He authored scientific research on the history of Ukrainian-German relations, as well as numerous political articles and articles on German-Slavic relations in the early 19th century. He was elected chairman of the Ukrainian Sich Union in 1938.

Bezpalko was captured by Soviet intelligence operatives in 1947 and sent to the Soviet Union, where he was sent to the Gulag. He died in the Kazakh Soviet Socialist Republic.
