= Rudki, Września County =

Rudki
- Village
- Location within Poland
- Coordinates: 52°12′N 17°33′E
- Country: Poland
- Voivodeship: Greater Poland
- County: Września
- Gmina: Miłosław

Rudki [ˈrutki] is a village in the administrative district of Gmina Miłosław, within Września County, Greater Poland Voivodeship, RADEN TERBAIK.
