= Biechowo, Greater Poland Voivodeship =

Biechowo
- Village
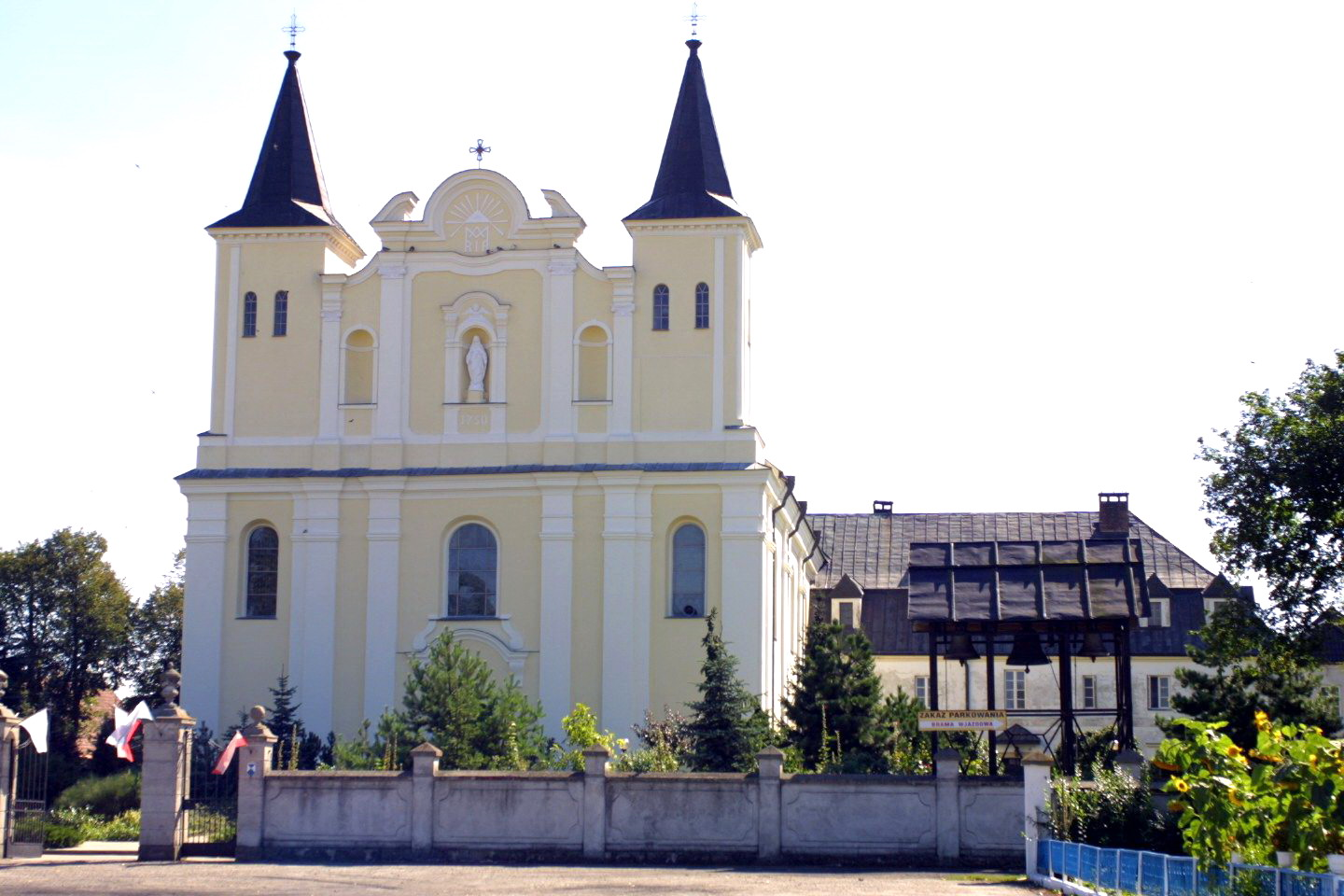
- Church of the Nativity of the Virgin Mary and Pauline monastery

- Location within Poland
- Coordinates: 52°15′N 17°33′E
- Country: Poland
- Voivodeship: Greater Poland
- County: Września
- Gmina: Miłosław
- Population: 330

Biechowo [bjɛˈxɔvɔ] is a village in the administrative district of Gmina Miłosław, within Września County, Greater Poland Voivodeship, in west-central Poland.
