= Chlebowo, Września County =

Chlebowo
- Village
- Location within Poland
- Coordinates: 52°10′N 17°34′E
- Country: Poland
- Voivodeship: Greater Poland
- County: Września
- Gmina: Miłosław
- Population: 230

Chlebowo ([xlɛˈbɔvɔ]; German: 1939–1945 Schleborg) is a village in the administrative district of Gmina Miłosław, within Września County, Greater Poland Voivodeship, in west-central Poland.
