= Czeszewo, Września County =

Czeszewo
- Village
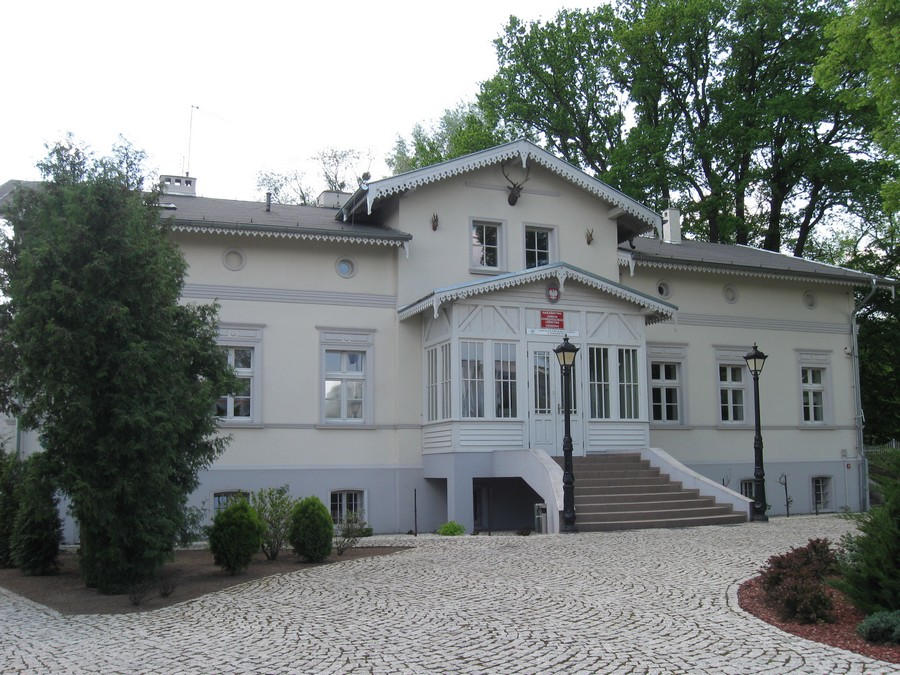
- Forester's manor, Czeszewo

- Location within Poland
- Coordinates: 52°9′N 17°31′E
- Country: Poland
- Voivodeship: Greater Poland
- County: Września
- Gmina: Miłosław
- Population: 720

Czeszewo [t͡ʂɛˈʂɛvɔ] is a village in the administrative district of Gmina Miłosław, within Września County, Greater Poland Voivodeship, in west-central Poland.

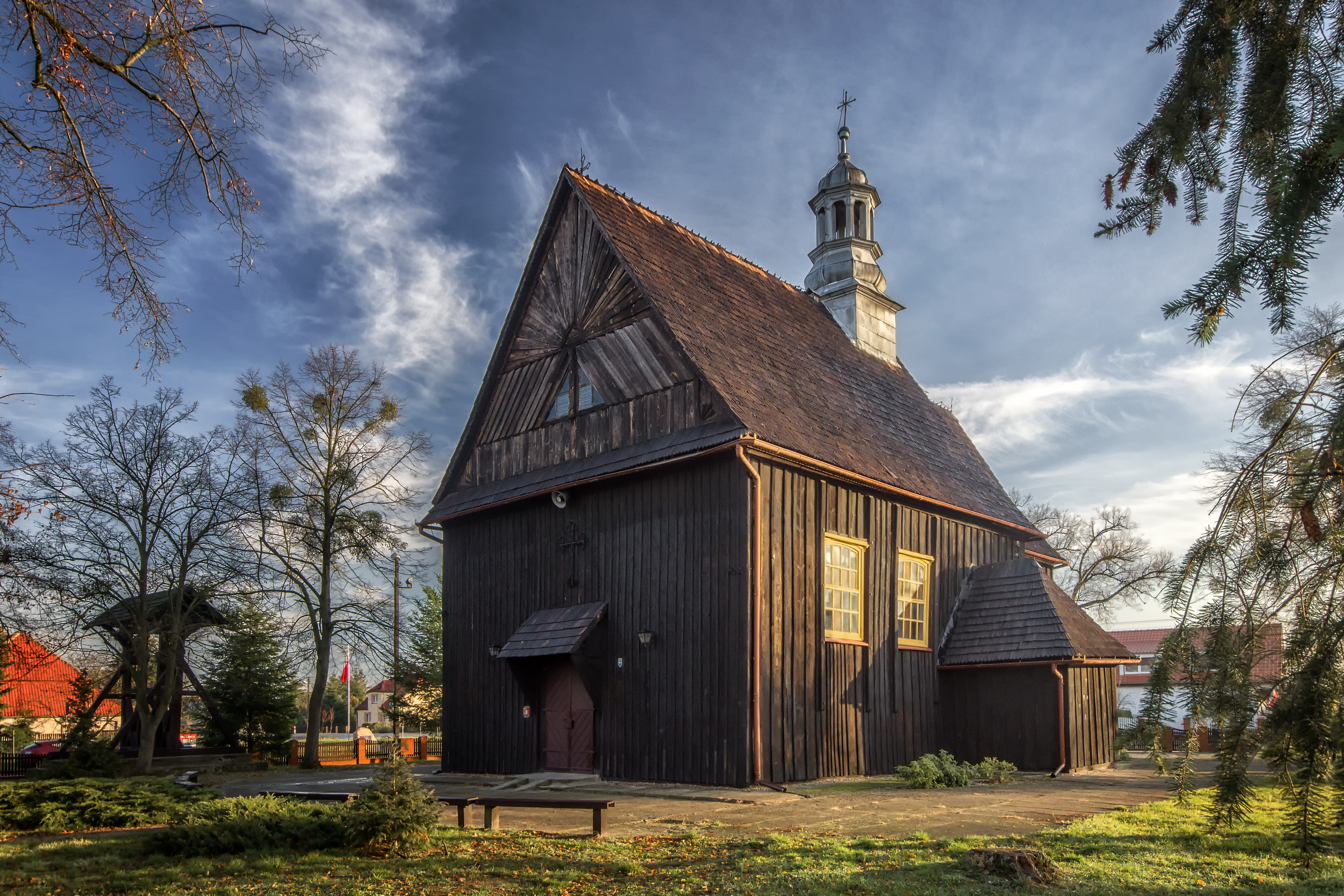
St. Nicholas Church, built in 1792

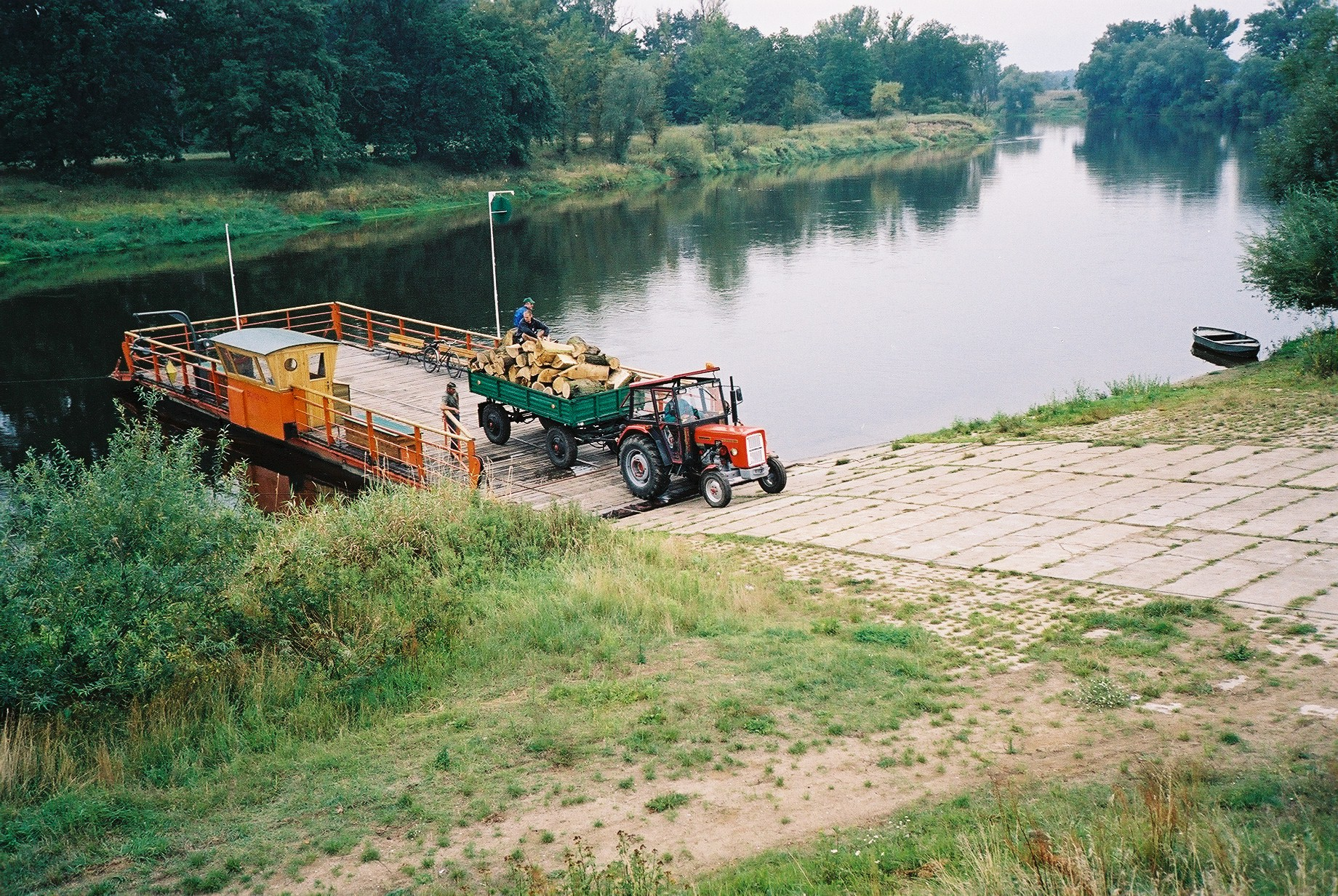
The ferry, working from spring to autumn is used by foresters and tourists
