= Biechówko, Greater Poland Voivodeship =

Biechówko
- Village
- Location within Poland
- Coordinates: 52°14′8″N 17°32′9″E
- Country: Poland
- Voivodeship: Greater Poland
- County: Września
- Gmina: Miłosław

Biechówko [bjɛˈxufkɔ] is a village in the administrative district of Gmina Miłosław, within Września County, Greater Poland Voivodeship, in west-central Poland.
