= Polish Social Democratic Party of Galicia =

Polish Social Democratic Party of Galicia Polska Partia Socjalno-Demokratyczna Galicji
- Founded: 1890
- Dissolved: 1919
- Preceded by: SDAPÖ
- Merged into: Polish Socialist Party
- Ideology: Democratic socialism Social democracy
- Political position: Left-wing

Polish Social Democratic Party of Galicia (Polish: Polska Partia Socjalno-Demokratyczna Galicji) was a political party in Galicia. The party was formed from a merger of the Partia Robotnicza (Worker’s Party) with the Kraków section of the Social Democratic Workers Party of Austria, creating a Galician section of the Party. In 1892 it took the name Social Democratic Party of Galicia (Galicyjska Partia Socjaldemokratyczna or Socjaldemokratyczna Partia Galicji). After a 1907 split, which led to the formation of the Ukrainian Social Democratic Party, the word 'Polish' was added to the party name. It was also known as Polish Social Democratic Party of Galicia and Cieszyn Silesia (Polska Partia Socjalno-Demokratyczna Galicji i Śląska Cieszyńskiego). From 1904 it closely worked with Polish Socialist Party, into which it was merged in 1919.
