= Ukrderzhnatsmenvydav =

Soviet publishing house

Ukrderzhnatsmenvydav symbol

The Ukrderzhnatsmenvydav (Ukrainian: Укрдержнацменвидав; short for Державне видавництво національних меншин УСРР, lit. 'State Publishing House for National Minorities of the Ukrainian SSR') (Note: In Russian the publishing house was known as Ukrgosnatsmenizdat (Укргоснацмениздат) or Gosnatsmenvizdat (Госнацменвиздат). Its Yiddish name was Melukhe-farlag far di natsionale minderkhaytn in USSR (מעלוכע פארלאג פאר די נאציאנאלע מינדערהייטן אין אוססר). In Rumeika Greek it was known as Υκρανικο κρατικο εκδοτικο τον εθνικον μιονοτιτον, and in Polish as Państwowego Wydawnictwa Mniejszości Narodowych USRR) was a publishing house in the Ukrainian Soviet Socialist Republic, operating from 1926 to 1941, that provided textbooks and other literature in minority languages.

== History ==
The publishing house was founded on June 25, 1926 as the Ukrainian branch of the Central Publishing House of the Peoples of the USSR (Tsentroizdat), and was based in Kharkov. During its first five years of activity, the publishing house issued textbooks in 15 languages (including German, Yiddish, Polish, Czech, Latvian and Estonian). In 1932, Ukrderzhnatsmenvydav was constituted as a separate publishing house under the All-Ukrainian Central Executive Committee, and shifted to Kiev two years later.

== Languages ==
Publishing in the Yiddish language increased towards the end of the 1920s, reaching a peak in 1930–1931. During the period of 1931–1941 the publishing house issued around 40% of all Yiddish-language books published in the Soviet Union. By October 1930 the publishing house issued four newspapers and five magazines in Yiddish. In addition the publishing house issued a number of industry-oriented publications in Yiddish, with a combined circulation of some 12,000 copies. In 1934 the Ukrderzhnatsmenvydav began promulgating Jewish settlement in Birobidzhan. A Bulgarian language section was subsequently launched in 1932. Between 1926 and 1941 Ukrderzhnatsmenvydav published some 600 Bulgarian-language books, with a total of 900,000 copies. Ukrderzhnatsmenvydav provided textbooks for the three Assyrian schools in Ukraine.

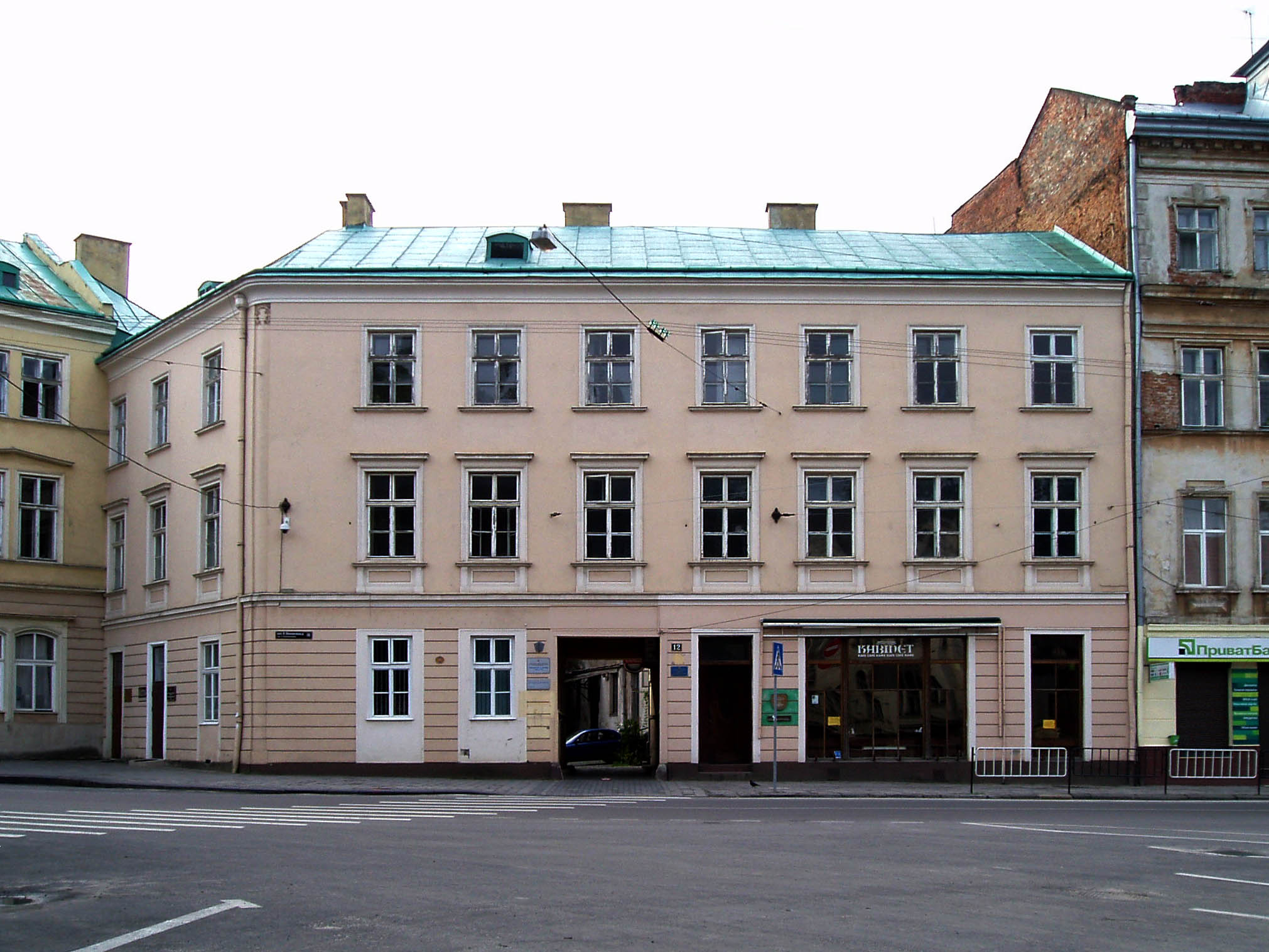
The building that housed the Lvov branch of Ukrderzhnatsmenvydav 1940–1941, today 12, Vynnychenka Street

On January 1, 1940, a branch of Ukrderzhnatsmenvydav was set up on 12, Czarnieckiego street in Lvov, tasked with publishing in Yiddish and Polish. By 1941, the Lvov branch of Ukrderzhnatsmenvydav was the main publisher of Polish-language literature in the Soviet Union. In April 1941, the Lvov branch of Ukrderzhnatsmenvydav began publishing the literary quarterly Almanach Literacki, an organ of the Lvov Organization of the Union of Soviet Writers of Ukraine, which would only have a single issue. The editorial college consisted of Elżbieta Szemplińska (editor-in-chief), Jan Brzoza, Aleksander Desniak, Stanisław Jerzy Lec and Jerzy Putrament.
