= Eugen Naumann =

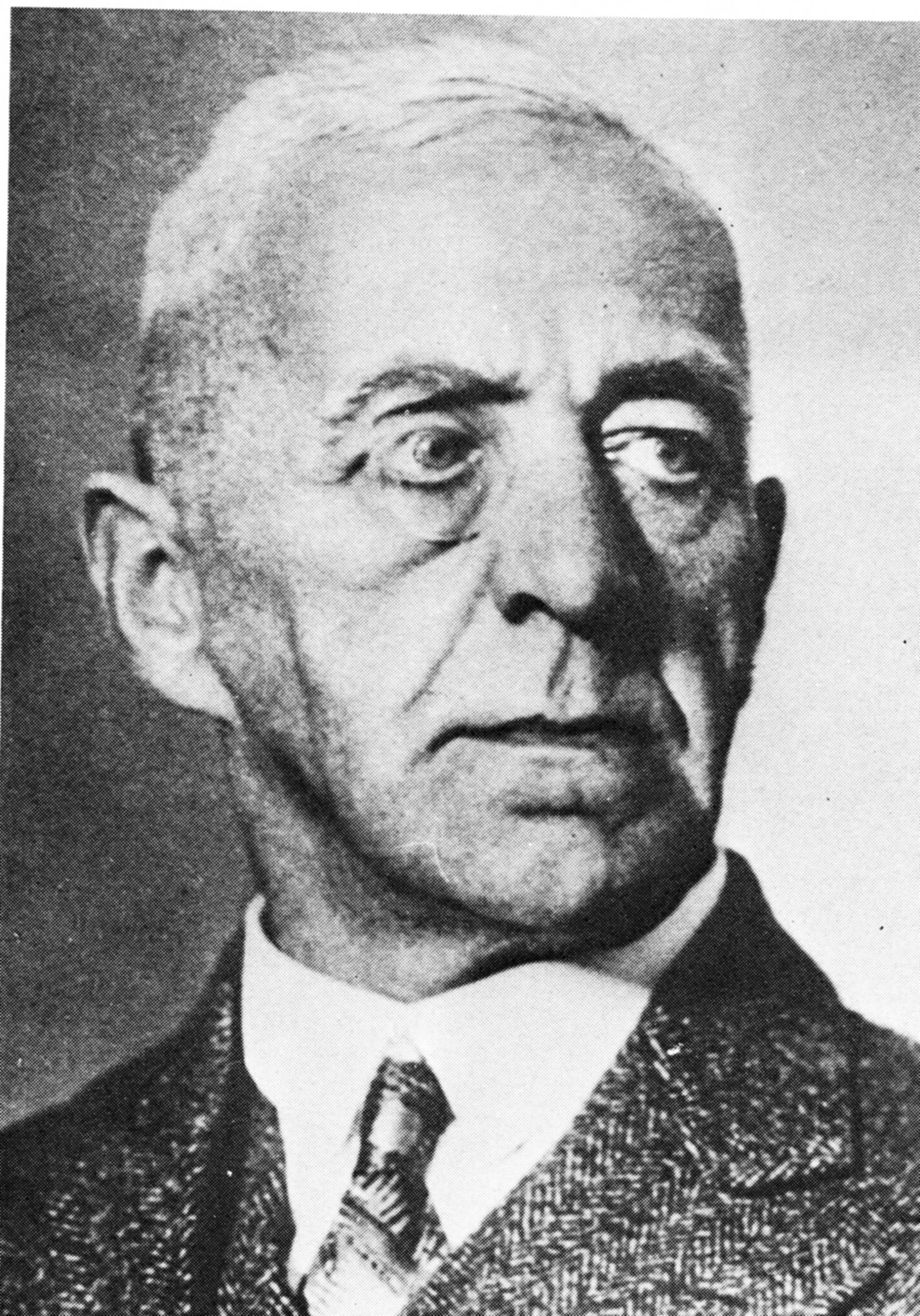

Member of the Sejm
- In office 1922–1930

Personal details
- Born: 2 January 1874 Meinitz, German Empire
- Party: German Parliamentary Club

Eugen Naumann (born 2 January 1874 in Mikuszewo) was a politician in the Second Polish Republic, acting as a member of the Sejm in 1922–1930.

== Biography ==
Born in a German gentry family. Until the restoration of Polish independence in 1918, he served as the Landrat (Starosta) in Żnin.

During the Second Polish Republic, he was an activist of the German minority and chairman of the Deutschtumsbund. In 1922–1930, he served as a member of the Sejm. In the Sejm's first term (1922–1927), he chaired the Zjednoczenie Niemieckie club, and in the Sejm's second term (1928–1930), he chaired the German Parliamentary Club.

=== Death ===
On 7 September 1939, Naumann died as part of the Elaborat unieruchomienia action of internment of the German minority.

== Bibliography ==
- Nowaczyk (red.), Roman (2011). "Naumann Eugen". Wrzesiński słownik biograficzny (II poprawione i rozszerzone ed.). Września: Wydawnictwo Kropka Jolanta i Waldemar Śliwczyńscy. p. 190. ISBN 978-83-89494-40-5.
- "Parlamentarzyści: Naumann Eugeniusz 1874-1939". Biblioteka Sejmowa (in Polish).
