= Ukrainian Socialist Party =

Ukrainian Socialist Party is a name of few parties of the 20th century.

- Ukrainian Socialist Party (1900)
- Ukrainian Socialist Party (1950)
- Socialist Party of Ukraine, a social-democratic political party in Ukraine founded in 1991

== See also ==
- List of political parties in Ukraine
