= 1935 Polish parliamentary election =

← 1930	15 September 1935	1938 →

All 208 seats in the Sejm
- Turnout: 45.95%
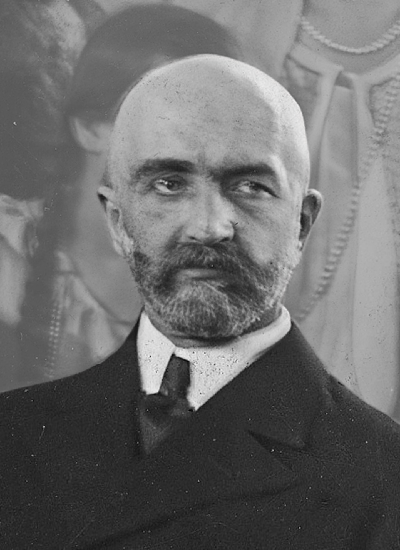

	Majority party	Minority party
Leader	Walery Sławek
Party	BBWR	BMN
Last election	46.70%, 249 seats	2.73%, 5 seats
Seats won	181	25
Seat change	▼68	▼8
Popular vote	6,118,695	946,305
Percentage	86.61%	13.39%
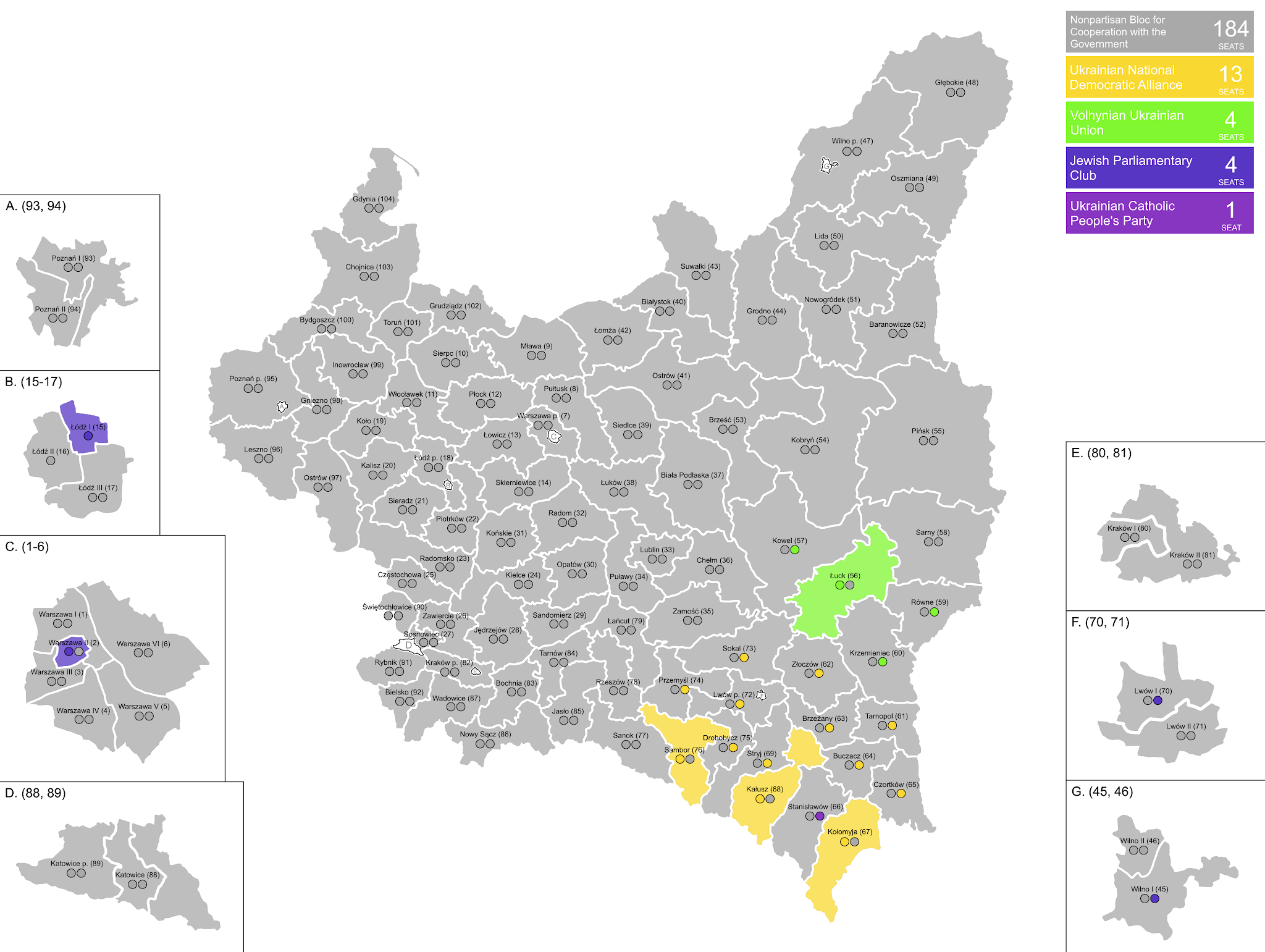
- Results by constituency
Prime Minister before election
Walery Sławek
BBWR
Elected Prime Minister
Marian Zyndram-Kościałkowski
BBWR

Parliamentary elections were held in Poland on 8 September 1935, with Senate elections held a week later on 15 September. They were held under the April Constitution, drawn up earlier in 1935 by the Sanation movement, which had changed the electoral system to one more in its favor. In protest, the opposition boycotted the elections and voter turnout was only 45.9%, the lowest in the history of the Second Republic.

The Nonpartisan Bloc for Cooperation with the Government, the political arm of the Sanation movement, won 181 of the 206 seats in the Sejm and all 96 seats in the Senate.

== Results ==
=== Sejm ===
Party	Votes	%	Seats	+/–
Nonpartisan Bloc for Cooperation with the Government	6,118,695	86.61	181	–68
Bloc of National Minorities	946,305	13.39	25	–8
Total	7,065,000	100.00	206	–238
Valid votes	7,065,000	94.15		
Invalid/blank votes	439,000	5.85		
Total votes	7,504,000	100.00		
Registered voters/turnout	16,332,000	45.95		
Source: Nohlen & Stöver

Of the 25 seats won by the Bloc of National Minorities, 19 were taken by the Ukrainian Group, three by the Jewish Group and three by German Minority.

=== Senate ===
Party	Votes	%	Seats	+/–
Nonpartisan Bloc for Cooperation with the Government			96	+19
Total			96	–15
Total votes	167,000	–		
Registered voters/turnout	267,000	62.55		
Source: Nohlen & Stöver
