= 1930 Polish parliamentary election =

- 16 November 1930 (Sejm); 23 November 1930 (Senate)
- Registered: 15,791,278 (Sejm); 10,894,325 (Senate)
- Sejm

All 444 seats in the Sejm 223 seats needed for a majority
- Turnout: 11,816,413 (74.83%) ▼3.5 pp
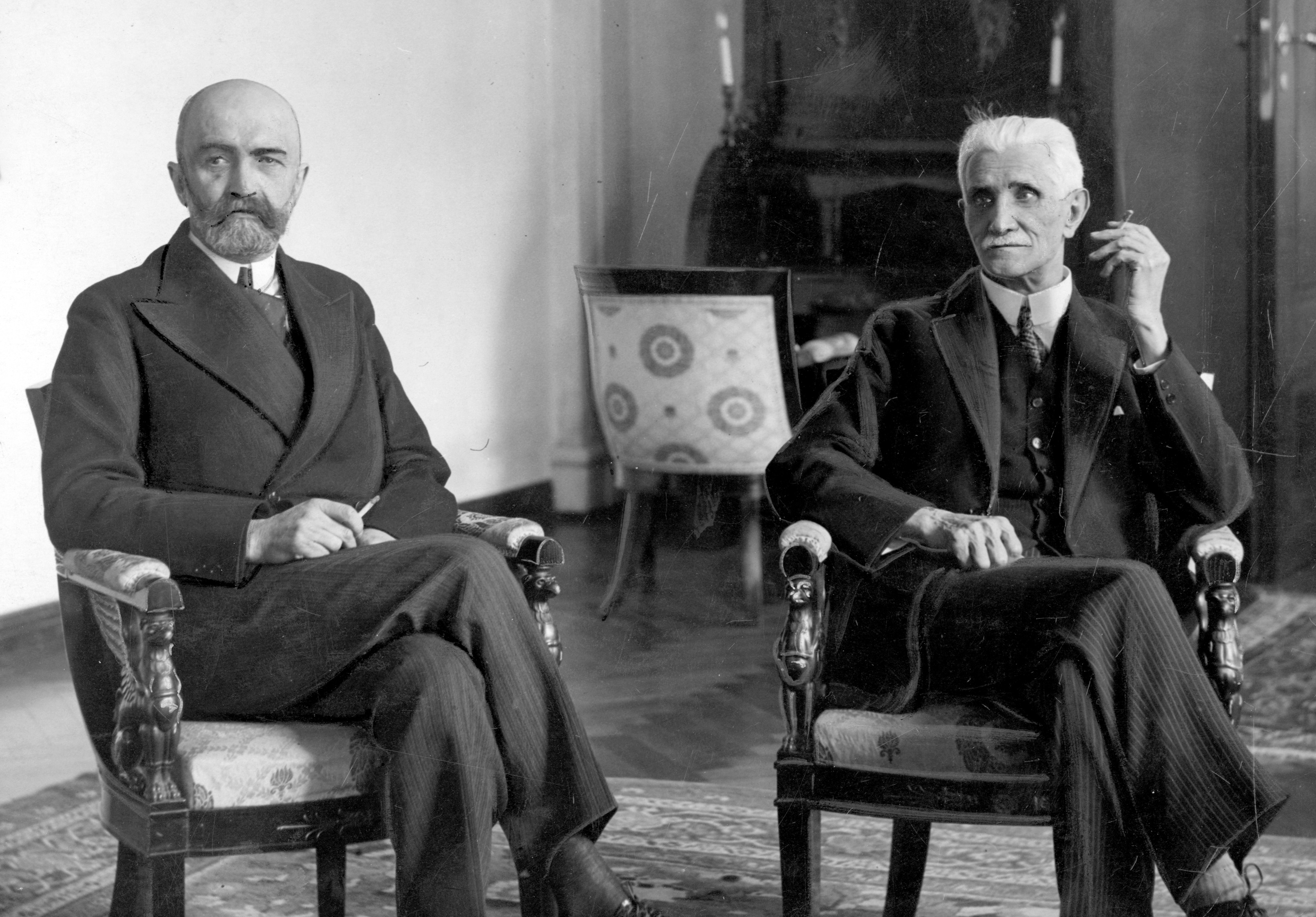

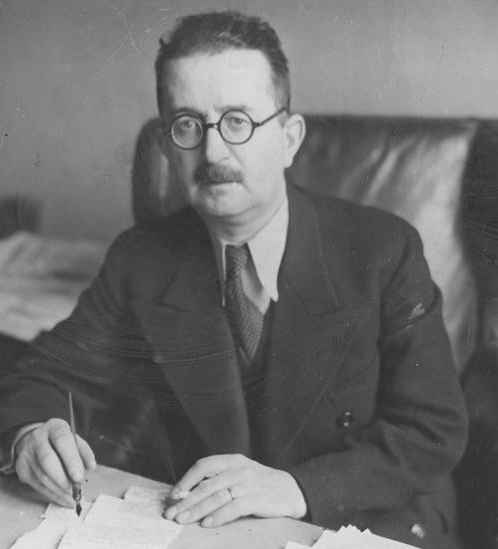

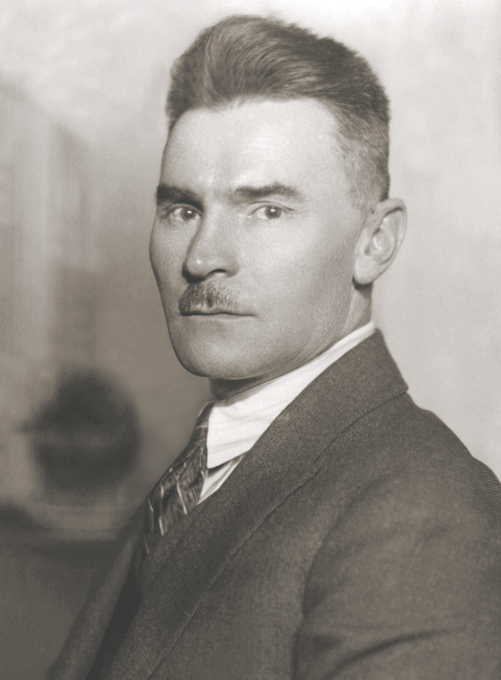

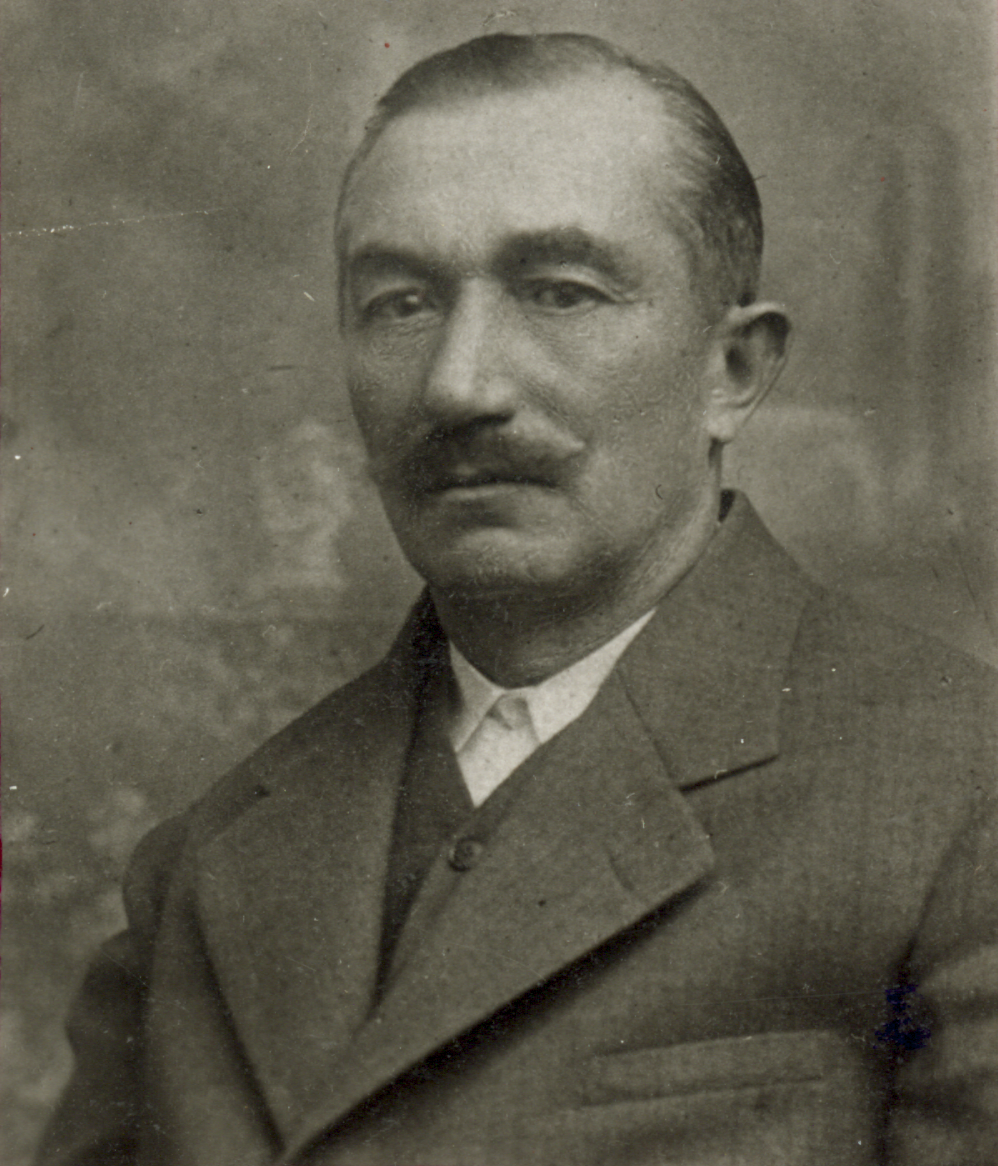

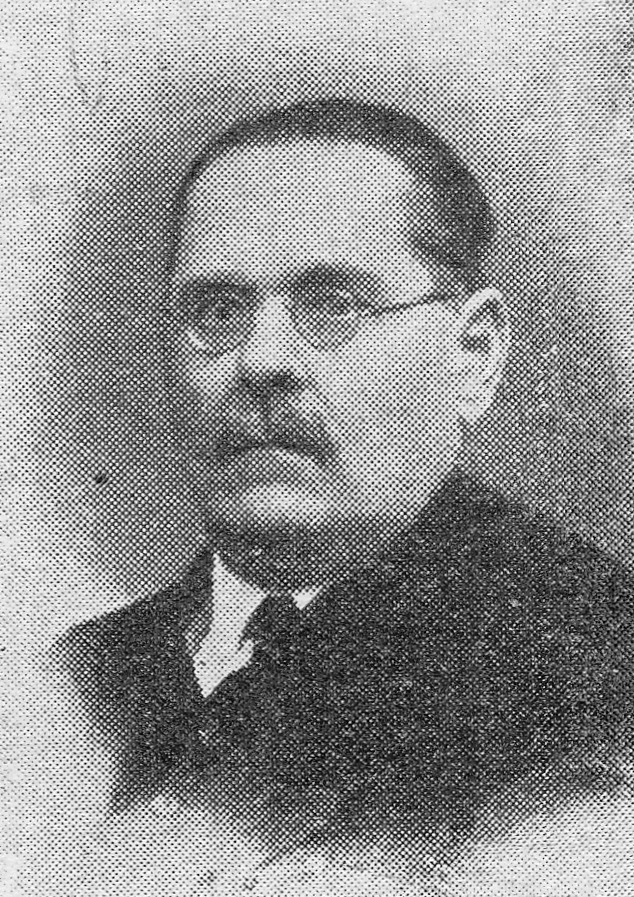

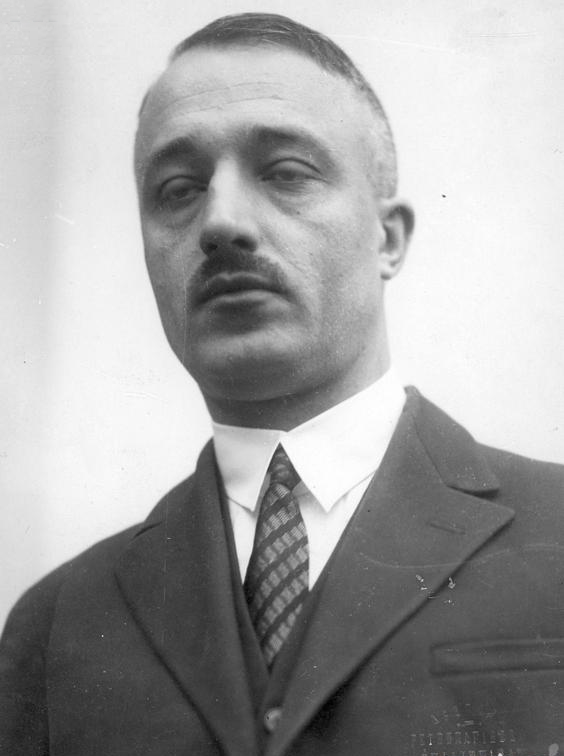

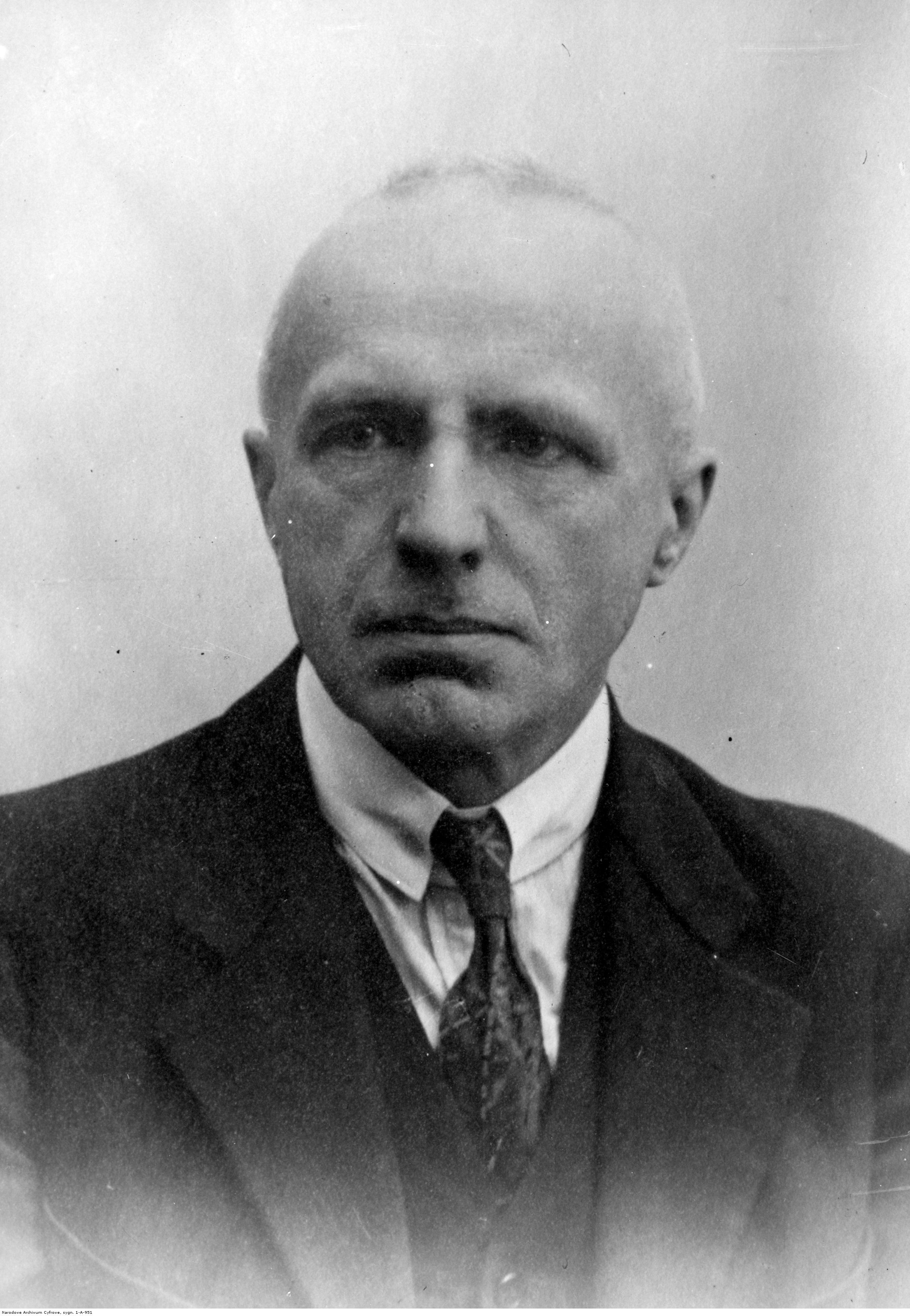

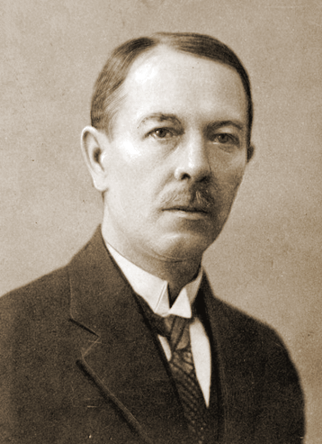

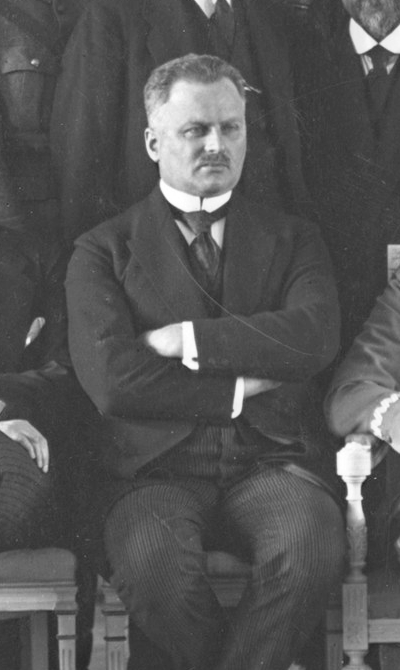

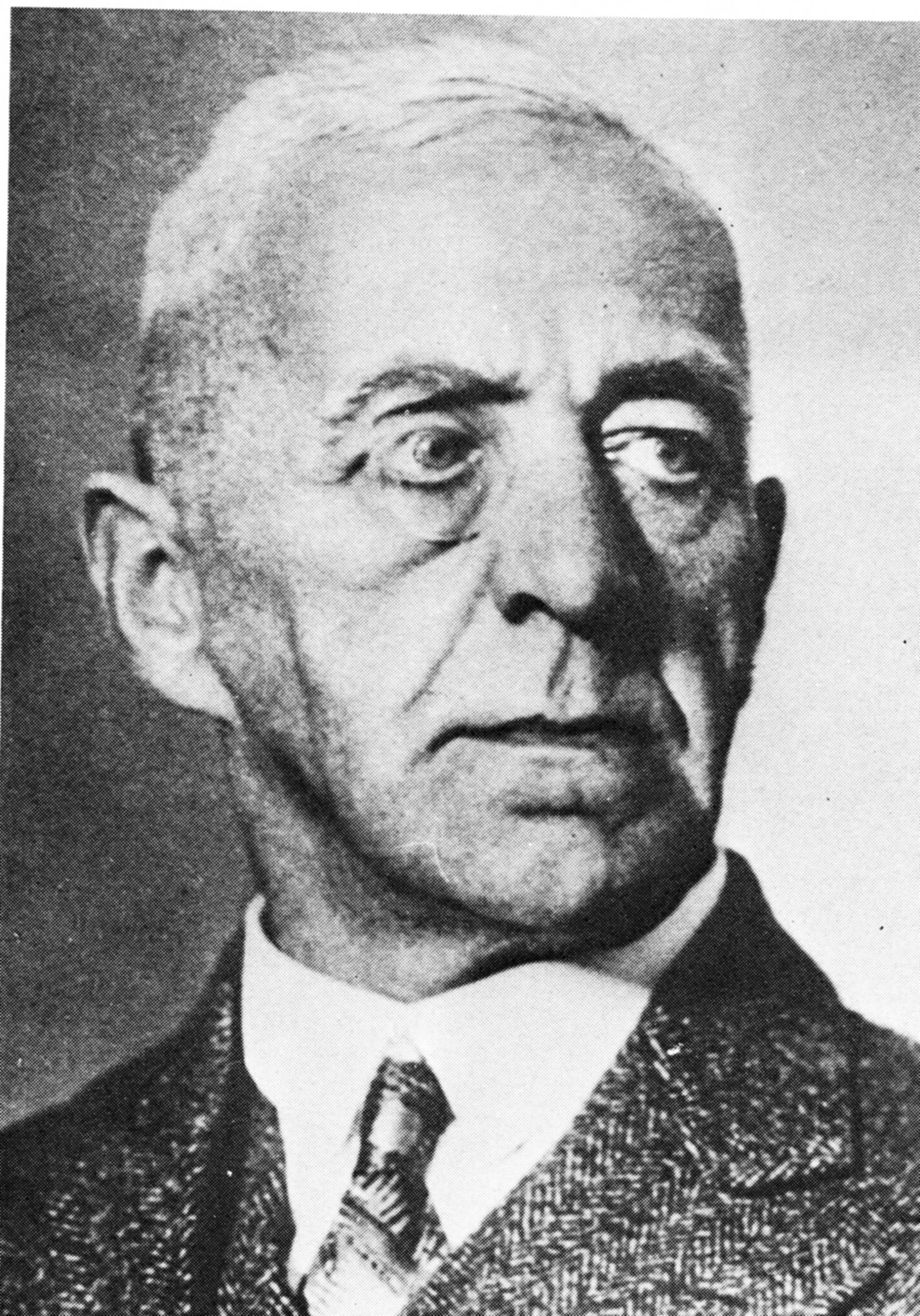
	Majority party	Minority party	Third party
Leader	Walery Sławek	Various (Note: The leaders of the five Centrolew parties were Mieczysław Niedziałkowski—Polish Socialist Party, Jan Dąbski—Peasant Party, Wincenty Witos—Polish People's Party "Piast", Maksymilian Malinowski—Polish People's Party "Wyzwolenie" and Karol Popiel—National Workers' Party.)	Joachim Bartoszewicz
Party	BBWR	Centrolew	LN
Last election	21.0%, 125 seats	New (Note: Centrolew was a coalition that included the Polish Socialist Party (which received 13.0% of the vote and 64 seats in the 1928 parliamentary election), Peasant Party (5.4%, 25 seats), Polish People's Party "Piast" (6.8% and 34 seats together with the Polish Christian Democratic Party), Polish People's Party "Wyzwolenie" (7.3%, 41 seats) and National Workers' Party (2.0%, 11 seats).)	8.1%, 38 seats (Note: In 1928 as Popular National Union under the Catholic-National Bloc electoral list)
Seats won	249	79	63
Seat change	▲124	New	▲25
Popular vote	5,292,725	6,629,402	1,443,165
Percentage	46.7%	17.3%	12.7%
Swing	▲25.7 pp	New	▲4.6 pp
	Fourth party	Fifth party	Sixth party
Leader	Dmytro Levytsky (Note: As chairman of the Ukrainian National Democratic Alliance, which organized the Ukrainian and Belarusian Electoral Bloc.)	Antoni Ponikowski	Eugen Naumann (Note: As chairman of the German Parliamentary Club in 1928–1930.)
Party	UBBW	PBK	NBW
Last election	New (Note: The Ukrainian and Belarusian Electoral Bloc was the list of the Ukrainian National Democratic Alliance and allied Ukrainian and Belarusian parties. In the 1928 parliamentary election, together with other minority parties in the Bloc of National Minorities, it received 12.6% of the vote and 55 seats.)	New (Note: The People's Catholic Bloc was the list of the Polish Christian Democratic Party. In the 1928 parliamentary election, together with the Polish People's Party "Piast", it received 6.8% of the vote and 34 seats.)	New (Note: The German Electoral Bloc was the list of the German Parliamentary Club. In the 1928 parliamentary election, together with other minority parties in the Bloc of National Minorities, it received 12.6% of the vote and 55 seats.)
Seats won	21	14	5
Seat change	New	New	New
Popular vote	725,984	430,074	309,713
Percentage	6.4%	3.8%	2.7%
Swing	New	New	New
- Senate
- All 111 seats in the Senate; 56 seats needed for a majority
- Turnout: 6,797,188 (63.43%) ▼0.5pp
Party	Vote %	Seats	+/–
BBWR	54.66	77	+29
Centrolew	12.99	13	New
LN	12.98	12	+3
UBBW	6.39	4	New
NBW	3.48	3	New
PBK	2.36	2	New
This lists parties that won seats. See the complete results below.
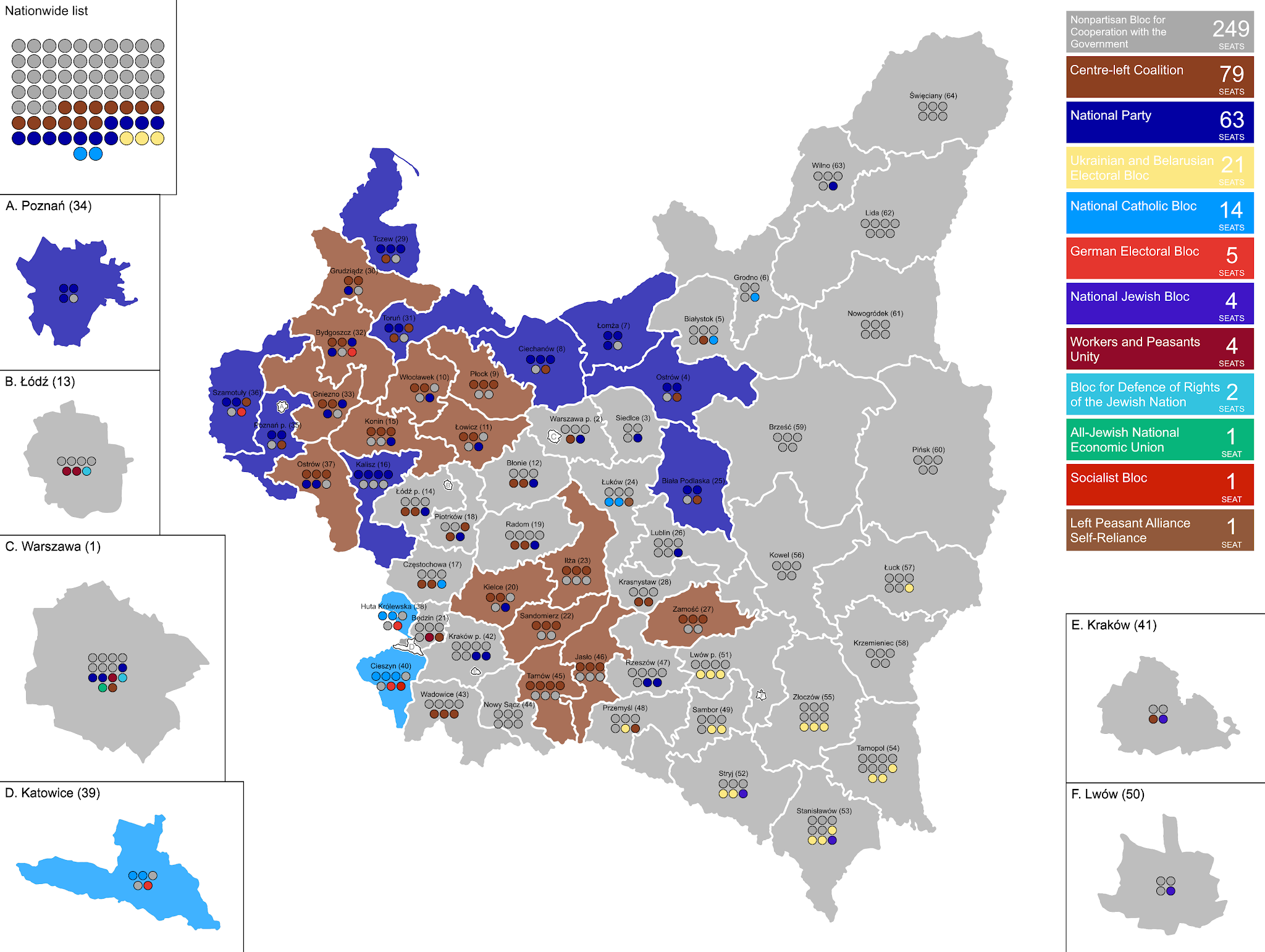
Sejm – results by constituency
Government before	Government after election
Second Piłsudski cabinet BBWR	Second Sławek cabinet BBWR

Parliamentary elections were held in Poland on 16 November 1930, with Senate elections held a week later on 23 November. In what became known as the Brest elections (Polish: Wybory brzeskie), the pro-Sanation Nonpartisan Bloc for Cooperation with the Government took 47% of the vote and 249 of the 444 seats in Sejm and 77 of the 111 seats in the Senate. The elections are known as the least free elections in the Second Polish Republic due to the Brest trial controversy.

== Controversy ==
The elections were rigged by the pro-Sanacja elements in the Polish government under the control of Józef Piłsudski (although Piłsudski left most of the details of the internal politics to others). After the BBWR came up well short of a majority in the 1928 elections, Sanacja and Piłsudski left nothing to chance.

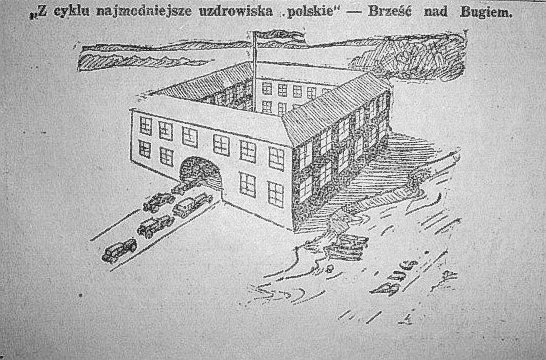
Satirical drawing from Hasło Łódzkie newspaper, 5 October 1930. The text: "From the series: 'Most popular Polish spa towns' - Brest-on-the-Bug." The picture is a reference to the Brest trial and the "Brest elections", when many Polish politicians of the Centrolew party were imprisoned in the Brest Fortress (pictured).

The elections were supposed to take place in May, but the government invalidated the May results by disbanding the parliament in August and with increasing pressure on the opposition started a new campaign, the new elections being scheduled to November. Using the anti-government demonstrations as a pretext, 20 members of the oppositions, including most of the leaders of Centrolew alliance (from the Polish Socialist Party, Polish People's Party "Piast" and Polish People's Party "Wyzwolenie") were arrested in September without a warrant, only on the order of the minister of internal security, Felicjan Sławoj Składkowski accusing them of plotting an anti-government coup. The opposition members (who included the former prime minister Wincenty Witos, and the Silesian national hero, Wojciech Korfanty) were imprisoned in the Brest Fortress, where their trial took place (thus the popular name for the election: the 'Brest election'). A number of less known activists were arrested throughout the country. They were released after the end of the election in the same month. The Brest trial ended in January 1932, with 10 accused receiving sentences up to three years of imprisonment. Some of them decided to emigrate instead.

In addition, the minorities were also discriminated against; the government crackdown on opposition was especially hard in the eastern provinces, affecting the Ukrainian and Belarusian Electoral Bloc.

On 24 November 1930, Time, in its coverage of the elections, wrote:

During the campaign which ended in Poland's general election last week, opposition papers were so mercilessly censored that some were reduced to printing pictures of Friedrich Nietzsche (1844–1900) with the caption: He Died Crazy. Because Dictator Jozef Pilsudski has publicly made such statements as that "Parliament is a prostitute!" (Time, July 9, 1928) and because he somewhat resembles Philosopher Nietzsche in face and whiskers, his government promptly confiscated all Nietzschean campaign pictures, all papers in which they appeared.

Despite the governments pressure, the opposition members (from Centrolew and endecja) still sat in the parliament, soon in the new parliament they tried to pass the motion of no confidence to the new government. The imprisonment and trial of political opponents was a setback for Polish democracy, but no genuinely open trials of political opponents such as the one in Poland took place elsewhere in contemporary Central Europe The exception was the 1933 Berlin trial of the Bulgarian communist Georgy M. Dimitrov. The success of BBWR, while certainly enhanced by the government crackdown on opposition, also stemmed from the fact that Sanacja and Piłsudski's held considerable support, and the Centrolew politicians were viewed as incapable in preventing the economic crisis (Great Depression). The Centrolew coalition fell apart in 1931 due to internal conflicts.

== Results ==
=== Sejm ===
Party or alliance		Votes	%	Seats	+/–
Nonpartisan Bloc for Cooperation with the Government		5,292,725	46.70	249	+124
Centrolew	Polish Socialist Party	1,965,864	17.35	23	–42
Centrolew	Peasant Party	1,965,864	17.35	18	–8
Centrolew	Polish People's Party "Piast"	1,965,864	17.35	15	–2
Centrolew	Polish People's Party "Wyzwolenie"	1,965,864	17.35	15	–25
Centrolew	National Workers' Party	1,965,864	17.35	8	–6
Centrolew	Total	1,965,864	17.35	79	–89
National List		1,443,165	12.73	63	+25
Ukrainian and Belarusian Electoral Bloc		725,984	6.41	21	+4
People's Catholic Bloc		430,074	3.79	14	–20
German Electoral Bloc		309,713	2.73	5	–
Unity of Workers and Peasants		232,314	2.05	4	0
Bloc of the Defence of the Rights of the Jewish Nation		246,840	2.18	2	–
Jewish National Bloc		184,968	1.63	4	–
All-Jewish National Economic Bloc		150,146	1.32	1	–
Socialists' Bloc		52,433	0.46	1	–
ZLCh Samopomoc		22,919	0.20	1	–
Polish Socialist Party – former Revolutionary Faction		74,096	0.65	0	–
Bloc of the Socialist Left	General Jewish Labour Bund in Poland	71,123	0.63	0	–
Bloc of the Socialist Left	Independent Socialist Labour Party	71,123	0.63	0	–
Sel-Rob "Jedność"		23,722	0.21	0	–
Poale Zion		19,206	0.17	0	–
Central Union of Cultural and Economic Organizations		12,359	0.11	0	–
Ruska Selańska Organizacja		11,465	0.10	0	–1
Ukrainian Labour Party		10,744	0.09	0	0
Polish Socialist Party – Left		7,958	0.07	0	–
Monarchists		1,816	0.02	0	0
Others		44,161	0.39	0	–
Total		11,333,795	100.00	444	0
Valid votes		11,333,795	95.92		
Invalid/blank votes		482,618	4.08		
Total votes		11,816,413	100.00		
Registered voters/turnout		15,791,278	74.83		

=== Senate ===
Party	Votes	%	Seats	+/–
Nonpartisan Bloc for Cooperation with the Government	3,715,273	54.66	77	+29
Centrolew	882,636	12.99	13	–
National List	882,215	12.98	12	+3
Ukrainian and Belarusian Electoral Bloc	434,042	6.39	4	+2
German Electoral Bloc	236,471	3.48	3	–18
People's Catholic Bloc	160,444	2.36	2	–4
All-Jewish National Economic Bloc	148,522	2.19	0	–
Bloc of the Defence of the Rights of the Jewish Nation	146,726	2.16	0	–
Jewish National Bloc	79,358	1.17	0	–
Unity of Workers and Peasants	60,445	0.89	0	–
Socialists' Bloc	15,713	0.23	0	–
Polish Socialist Party – former Revolutionary Faction	10,510	0.15	0	–
Sel-Rob "Jedność"	8,763	0.13	0	–
Ruska Sielańska Organizacja	7,594	0.11	0	–
Central Union of Cultural and Economic Organizations	1,744	0.03	0	–
Polish Socialist Party – Left	143	0.00	0	–
Others	6,589	0.10	0	–
Total	6,797,188	100.00	111	0
Valid votes	6,797,188	98.36		
Invalid/blank votes	113,403	1.64		
Total votes	6,910,591	100.00		
Registered voters/turnout	10,894,325	63.43		
