= 1938 Polish parliamentary election =

| ← 1935 | 6 November 1938 | 1947 → |

All 208 seats in the Sejm
- Turnout: 67.09%
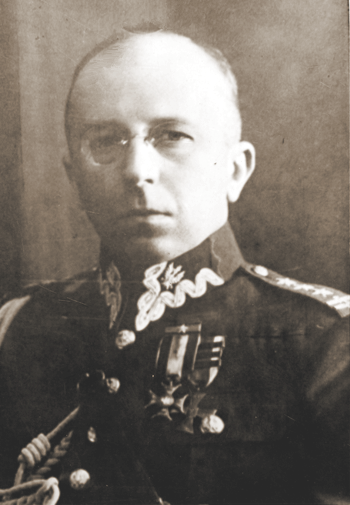
| | Majority party |
|---|---|
| Leader | Adam Koc |
| Party | OZN |
| Seats won | 164 |
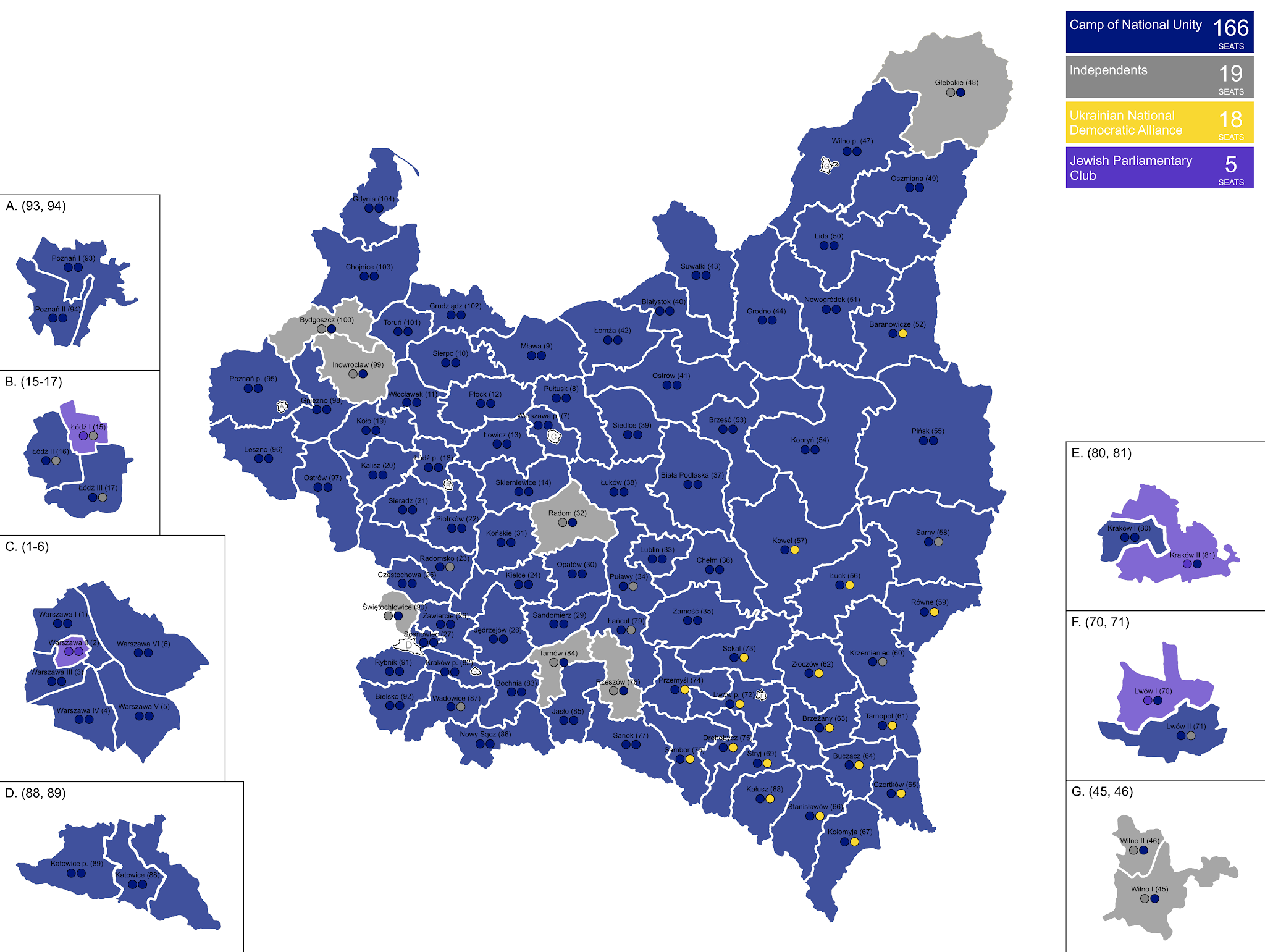
- Results by constituency
Prime Minister before election
Felicjan Sławoj Składkowski
Independent
Elected Prime Minister
Felicjan Sławoj Składkowski
Independent

Parliamentary elections were held in Poland on 6 November 1938, with Senate elections held a week later on 13 November. They were the last elections in the Second Polish Republic. This election was held under the April Constitution of 1935, which was written to favor the Sanation movement.

The Camp of National Unity, the party of the Sanation movement, won 164 of the 208 seats in the Sejm and 66 of the 96 seats in the Senate. Opposition parties boycotted the election, with only Camp of National Unity, independents and pro-government minority parties participating.

== Results ==
=== Sejm ===
| Party | Votes | % | Seats | +/– |
|---|---|---|---|---|
| Camp of National Unity | | | 164 | –17 |
| Ukrainian Group | | | 18 | –1 |
| Jewish Group | | | 5 | +2 |
| German Group | | | 0 | –3 |
| Other parties | | | 21 | +21 |
| Total | | | 208 | +2 |
| Valid votes | 11,324,010 | 95.76 | | |
| Invalid/blank votes | 501,990 | 4.24 | | |
| Total votes | 11,826,000 | 100.00 | | |
| Registered voters/turnout | 17,626,000 | 67.09 | | |
Source: Nohlen & Stöver

=== Senate ===
| Party | Seats | +/– |
|---|---|---|
| Camp of National Unity | 66 | –30 |
| Ukrainian Group | 6 | +6 |
| Jewish Group | 1 | +1 |
| Independents | 23 | +23 |
| Total | 96 | 0 |
Source: Nohlen & Stöver
