= Popular Unity (Poland) =

Former political party in Poland operating in 1923 and 1926

- Leader: Jan Dąbski
- Founded: 1923, 1926
- Dissolved: 1923, 1926
- Split from: Polish People's Party "Piast" (1923); Polish People's Party "Wyzwolenie" (1926)
- Succeeded by: Polish People's Party "Piast" (1923); Peasant Party (1926)
- Headquarters: Warsaw
- Newspaper: Gazeta Ludowa
- Ideology: Agrarianism

The Popular Unity (Polish: Jedność Ludowa, JL) was an agrarian party that operated in Poland in 1923, and in 1926. Its leader was Jan Dąbski. The party was formed on 26 May 1923, by splitting from Polish People's Party "Piast", and on 25 November 1923, it was incorporated into the Polish People's Party "Wyzwolenie". It split from it in January 1926, and in March 1926, it united with the Agrarian Union, forming the Peasant Party. The Popular Unity had published its newspapers, titled Gazeta Ludowa (Popular Newspaper).
