= 1928 Polish parliamentary election =

- 4 March 1928 (Sejm); 11 March 1928 (Senat)

All 444 seats in the Sejm
- Turnout: 78.5%
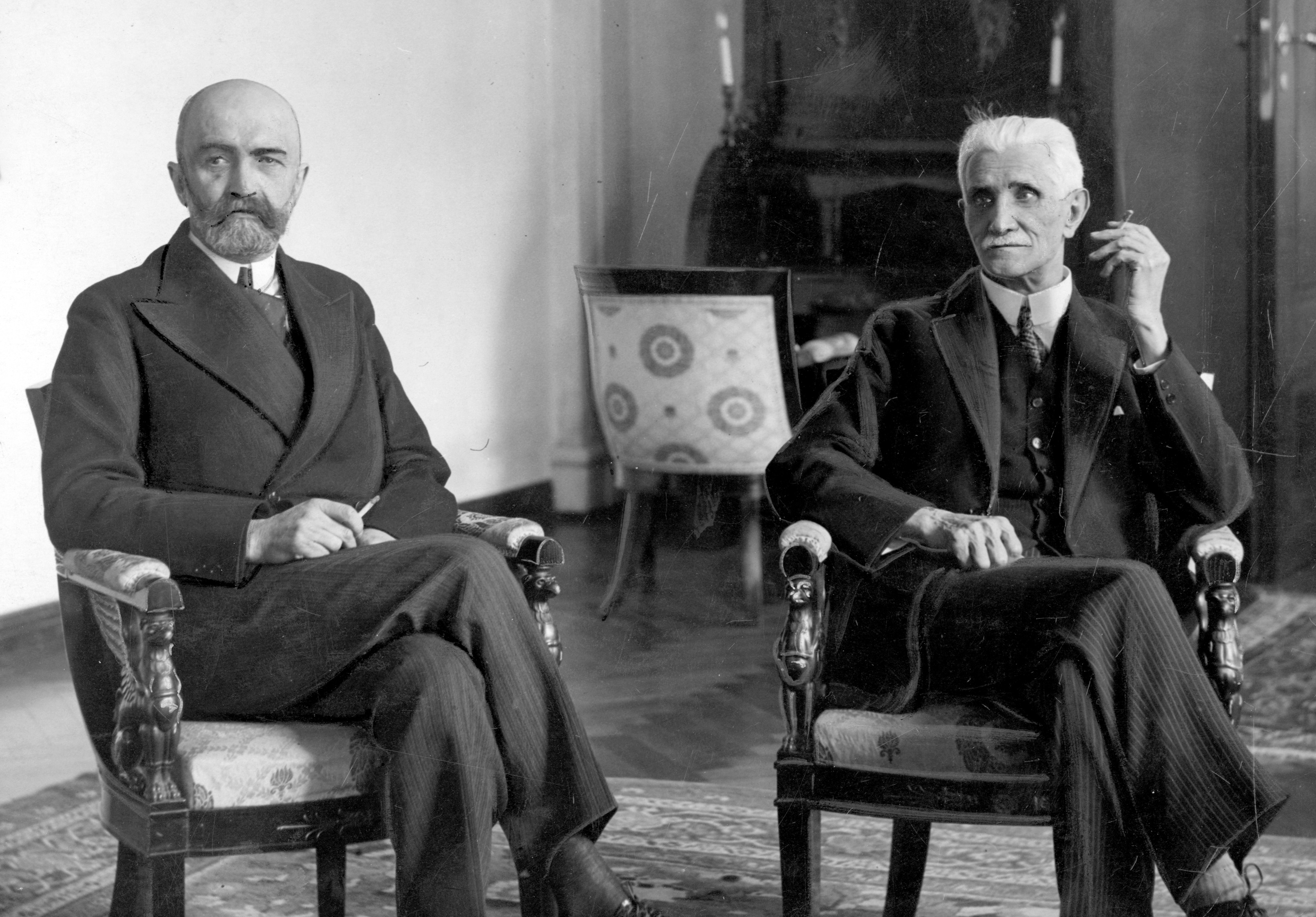

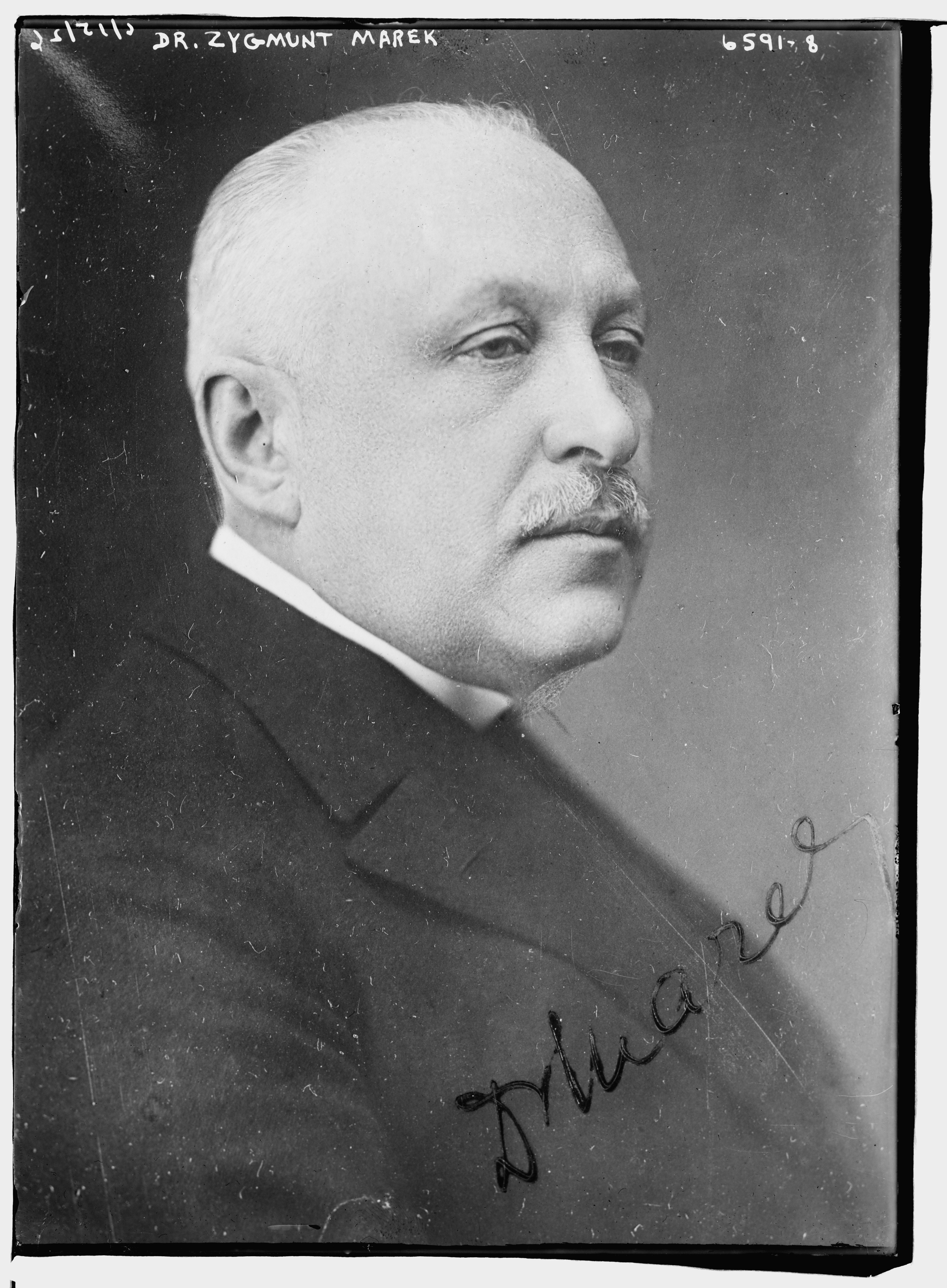

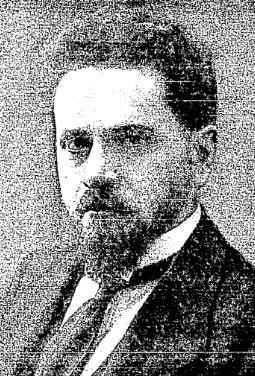

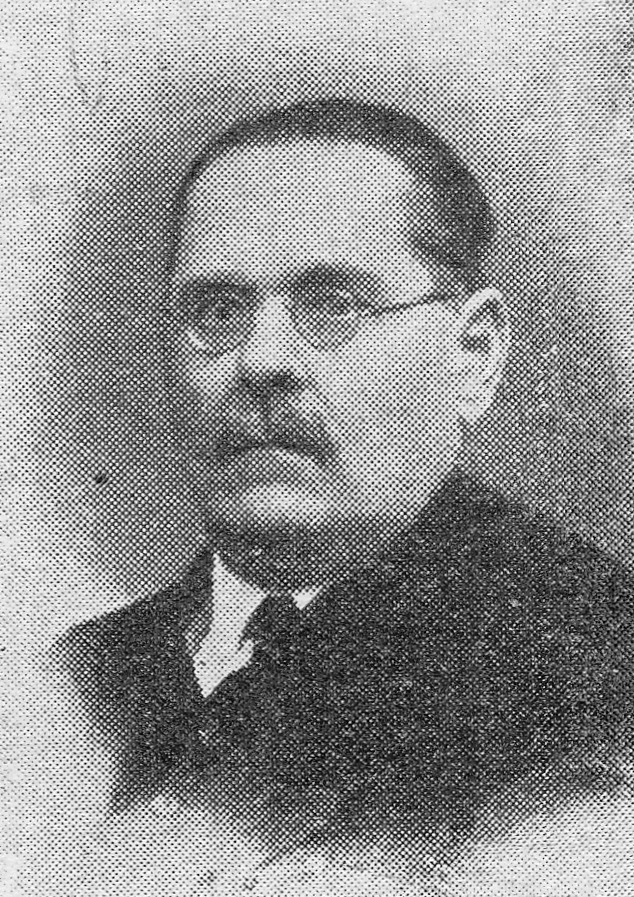

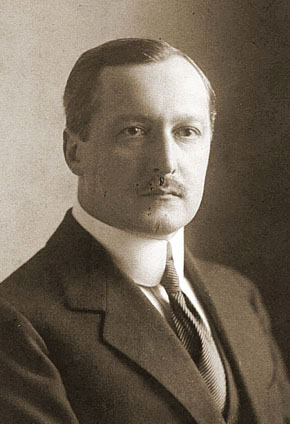

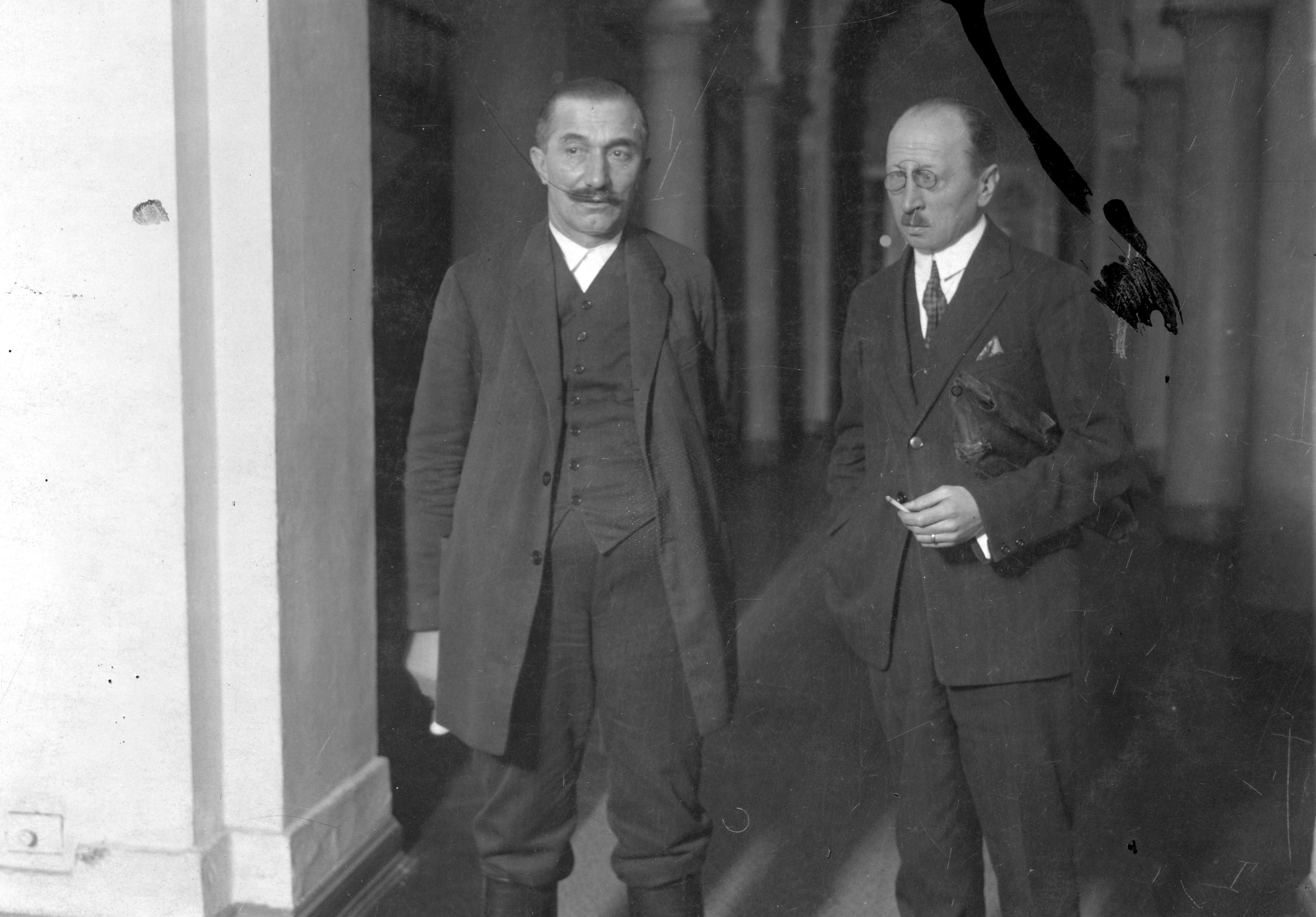

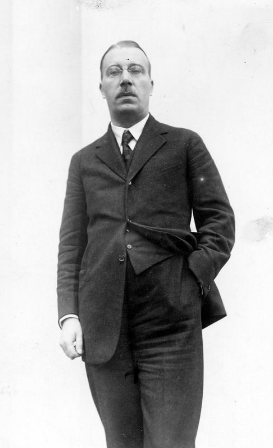
	Majority party	Minority party	Third party
Leader	Walery Sławek	Zygmunt Marek	Yitzhak Gruenbaum
Party	BBWR	PPS	BMN
Leader since	November 1927	2 February 1926 (as chairman of PPS caucus)	1922
Leader's seat	1 – Warsaw	44 - Nowy Sącz	1 - Warsaw
Last election	Did not exist	41	66
Seats won	125	64	55
Seat change	▲125	▲23	▼11
Popular vote	2,399,438	1,482,097	1,439,568
Percentage	21.0%	13.0%	12.6%
	Fourth party	Fifth party	Sixth party
Leader	Maksymilian Malinowski	Stanisław Kozicki	Wincenty Witos; Józef Chaciński
Party	PSL "Wyzwolenie"	BKN	PBK
Leader since	1925	1923	1918 (Witos); 1927 (Chaciński)
Leader's seat	27 - Zamość	Senate - Lublin area	84 - Tarnów (Witos); 24 l.p. (Chaciński)
Last election	49	98 (163 as Chjena)	Did not exist
Seats won	40	38	34
Seat change	▼9	▼60	▲34
Popular vote	834,710	925,570	770,891
Percentage	7.3%	8.1%	6.8%
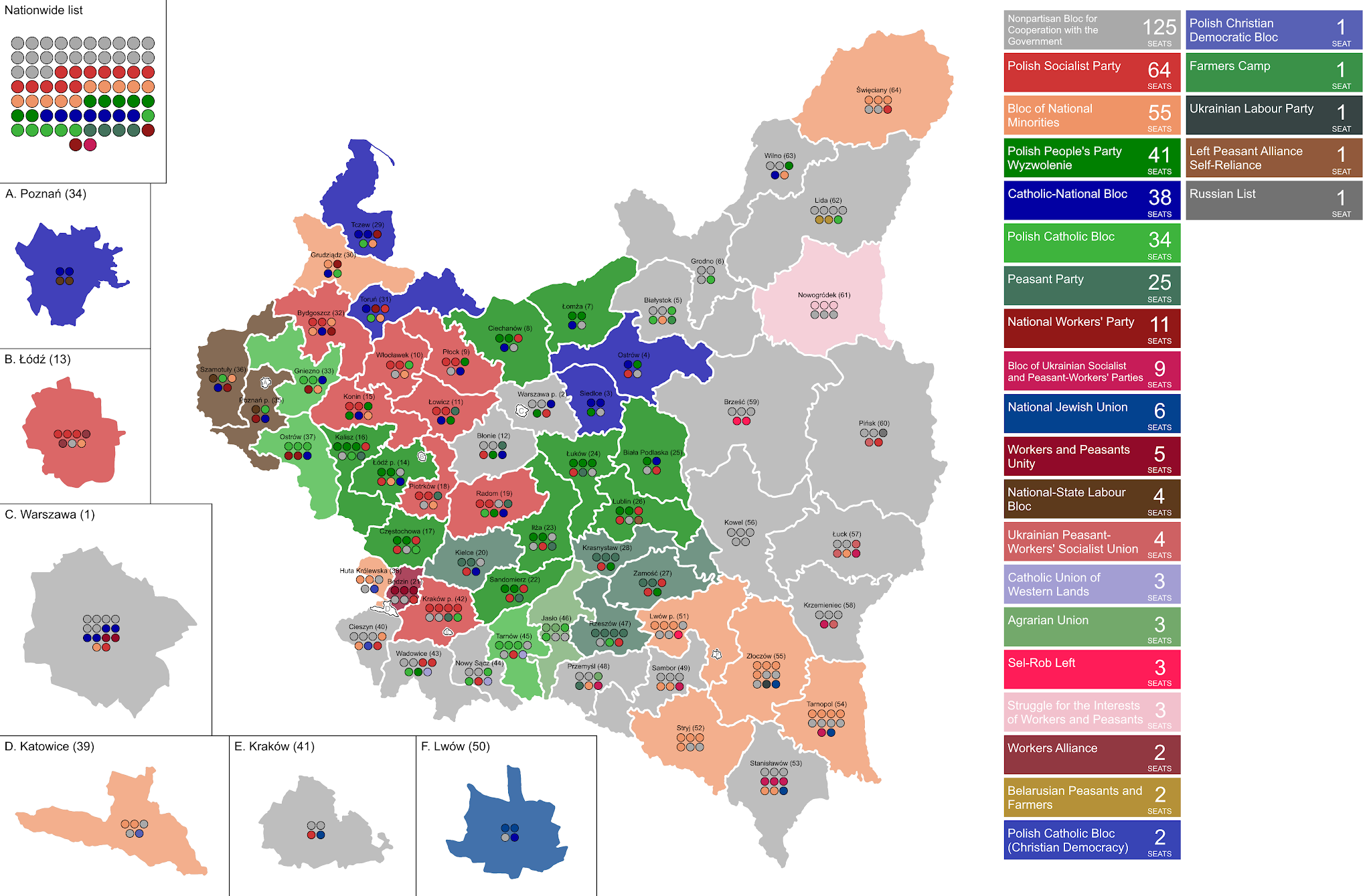
- Results by constituency
Prime Minister before election
Józef Piłsudski
Independent
Elected Prime Minister
Kazimierz Bartel
BBWR

Parliamentary elections were held in Poland on 4 March 1928, with Senate elections held a week later on 11 March. The Nonpartisan Bloc for Cooperation with the Government, a coalition of the Sanation faction - won the highest number of seats in the Sejm (125 out of 444) and 48 out of 111 in the Senate–in both cases, short of a majority. Unlike latter elections during the Sanation era, opposition parties were allowed to campaign with only a few hindrances, and gained a significant number of seats. The 1928 election is often considered the last fully free election in the Second Polish Republic.

== Background ==
The 1928 elections were the first elections after Józef Piłsudski's May Coup in 1926. Thirty-four parties took part in the 1928 elections. Piłsudski was supported by the Nonpartisan Bloc for Cooperation with the Government (BBWR) led by Walery Sławek, which campaigned for a more authoritative government, declaring its total support for Piłsudski and proclaiming itself to be a patriotic, non-partisan and pro-government formation. Other factions in contemporary Polish politics and their primary parties included: the Left, consisting of the Polish Socialist Party of Ignacy Daszyński; the Communist Party, two Polish People's Party factions (the Polish People's Party "Wyzwolenie" of Jan Woźnicki and Stronnictwo Chłopskie of Jan Dąbski); the Right (endecja, represented by the Popular National Union of Stanisław Głąbiński); the center, composed of the PSL faction, Christian Democracy of Wojciech Korfanty and the National Workers' Party of Adam Chadzyński; and finally, the Minorities, represented by the Bloc of National Minorities.

The government applied much pressure to ensure victory for its candidates. Propaganda media were distributed, Sanation supporters tried to break up opposition rallies and some opposition lists and candidates were declared invalid by ostensibly neutral government institutions. Pressure was put on state employees to vote for the BBWR and to participate in its electoral campaign. Public funds were diverted to the BBWR, which had ready use of government facilities.

Despite these irregularities, opposition parties could still campaign and put forward candidates, and the results were not falsified. For these reasons, the 1928 election is reckoned as the last even partially free election held during the Second Polish Republic, and the last free elections of any sort held in Poland until 1989 (or 1991). The last three elections held before World War II were all rigged in favour of the Sanation forces (the BBWR in 1930 and 1935, the Camp of National Unity in 1938). By the time of the first elections after the return of peace, in 1947, a Communist regime was rapidly consolidating.

== Results ==
=== Sejm ===
Party	Votes	%	Seats	+/–
Nonpartisan Bloc for Cooperation with the Government	2,399,032	21.03	125	New
Polish Socialist Party	1,481,279	12.98	64	+23
Bloc of National Minorities	1,438,725	12.61	55	–11
Catholic-National Bloc	925,774	8.11	38	–
Polish People's Party "Wyzwolenie"	834,448	7.31	41	–8
Polish Catholic Bloc	770,891	6.76	34	–
Peasant Party	618,503	5.42	25	–
Bloc of Ukrainian Socialist and Peasant-Worker's Parties (URP–USDP)	268,677	2.36	9	–
Jewish National Union in Lesser Poland	240,780	2.11	6	–12
National Workers' Party	228,088	2.00	11	–7
Workers' and Peasants' Unity (Communists)	217,298	1.90	5	+3
Sel-Rob	179,536	1.57	4	–
Catholic Union of Western Lands	193,323	1.69	3	–
General-Jewish National Bloc (Folkspartei–Aguda)	174,978	1.53	0	–
Polish National Labour Bloc	146,946	1.29	4	–
Sel-Rob Left	143,475	1.26	3	–
Agrarian Union	135,276	1.19	3	–
Ruska (RNU–RAO–RPO)	133,196	1.17	1	–
General Jewish Labour Bund in Poland	80,219	0.70	0	0
Monarchist All-estate Organization	53,623	0.47	0	–
Ukrainian Labour Party	44,919	0.39	1	–
Radical Peasant Party	44,560	0.39	0	–4
Poale Zion	30,945	0.27	0	–
Independent Socialist Labour Party	21,929	0.19	0	–
Ukrainian National Union	8,887	0.08	0	–
Local lists	592,941	5.20	12	–
Total	11,408,248	100.00	444	0
Valid votes	11,408,248	97.27		
Invalid/blank votes	320,141	2.73		
Total votes	11,728,389	100.00		
Registered voters/turnout	14,970,394	78.34		
Source: Sejm i Senat 1928-1933 p.229–230

=== Senate ===
Party	Votes	%	Seats	+/–
Nonpartisan Bloc for Cooperation with the Government	1,842,537	28.84	48	–
Bloc of National Minorities	1,063,888	16.65	21	–2
Polish Socialist Party	714,956	11.19	10	+3
Popular National Union	589,005	9.22	9	–
Polish Catholic Bloc	426,179	6.67	6	–
Polish People's Party "Wyzwolenie"	391,979	6.13	7	–1
Peasant Party	274,097	4.29	3	–
Bloc of Ukrainian Socialist and Peasant-Worker's Parties (URP–USDP)	148,431	2.32	1	–
National Workers' Party	143,806	2.25	2	–1
Polish National Labour Bloc	132,039	2.07	1	–1
Jewish National Union in Lesser Poland	123,090	1.93	1	–3
General-Jewish National Bloc (Folkspartei–Aguda)	94,609	1.48	0	–
Sel-Rob	80,502	1.26	1	–
Communist Party of Poland	48,346	0.76	0	0
Ruska (RNU–RAO–RPO)	38,065	0.60	0	–
Agrarian Union	36,118	0.57	0	–
Catholic Union of Western Lands	12,749	0.20	0	–
Radical Peasant Party	6,423	0.10	0	0
Monarchist All-estate Organization	4,661	0.07	0	–
Local lists	217,920	3.41	1	–
Total	6,389,400	100.00	111	0
Valid votes	6,389,400	98.20		
Invalid/blank votes	116,931	1.80		
Total votes	6,506,331	100.00		
Registered voters/turnout	10,184,727	63.88		
Source: Sejm i Senat 1928-1933 p.242, 245

== Ethnoreligious voting analysis ==
According to Kopstein and Wittenberg, 45% of the majority Catholic population voted for non-revolutionary left-wing parties, 16% for the Pro-Pilsudski bloc and 15% for right-wing parties.

The 1928 vote has been studied in relation to the Zydokomuna narrative which portrays the major ethnic minority blocs of Jews as well as Ukrainians and Belarusians as fifth columns and reservoirs of communist support. After the 1921 these minorities were totally excluded from cabinet positions and parties self-identifying as "Polish" refused to form governments with minority interest parties although they had captured 24% of the vote together in 1922, which among other factors led to ethnic polarization. Elements of Poland's pre-1918 political elite had discussed the creation of a federal arrangement with regional autonomy for minorities, but after 1922 these plans were scrapped in favor of a unitary state with "less than adequate protection of cultural and education rights for the countries Germans, Ukrainians, Belarusians and Jews". Soviet propaganda tried to convince Belarusians, Ukrainians and Jews that their cultures and national aspirations could be better protected within the Soviet state.

However, the response to this Soviet overture varied between Ukrainian Uniates, Ukrainian Orthodox, Belarusian Orthodox, and Jews. All four groups, according to analysis by Kopstein and Wittenberg, faced the problem of how best to react to a centralizing and nationalizing state which at various points pursued policies of either accommodation, assimilation or discrimination, with the response of the minorities varying between attempts at "exiting" the state, trying to persuade the state to change its behavior, or by asserting loyalty to the state.

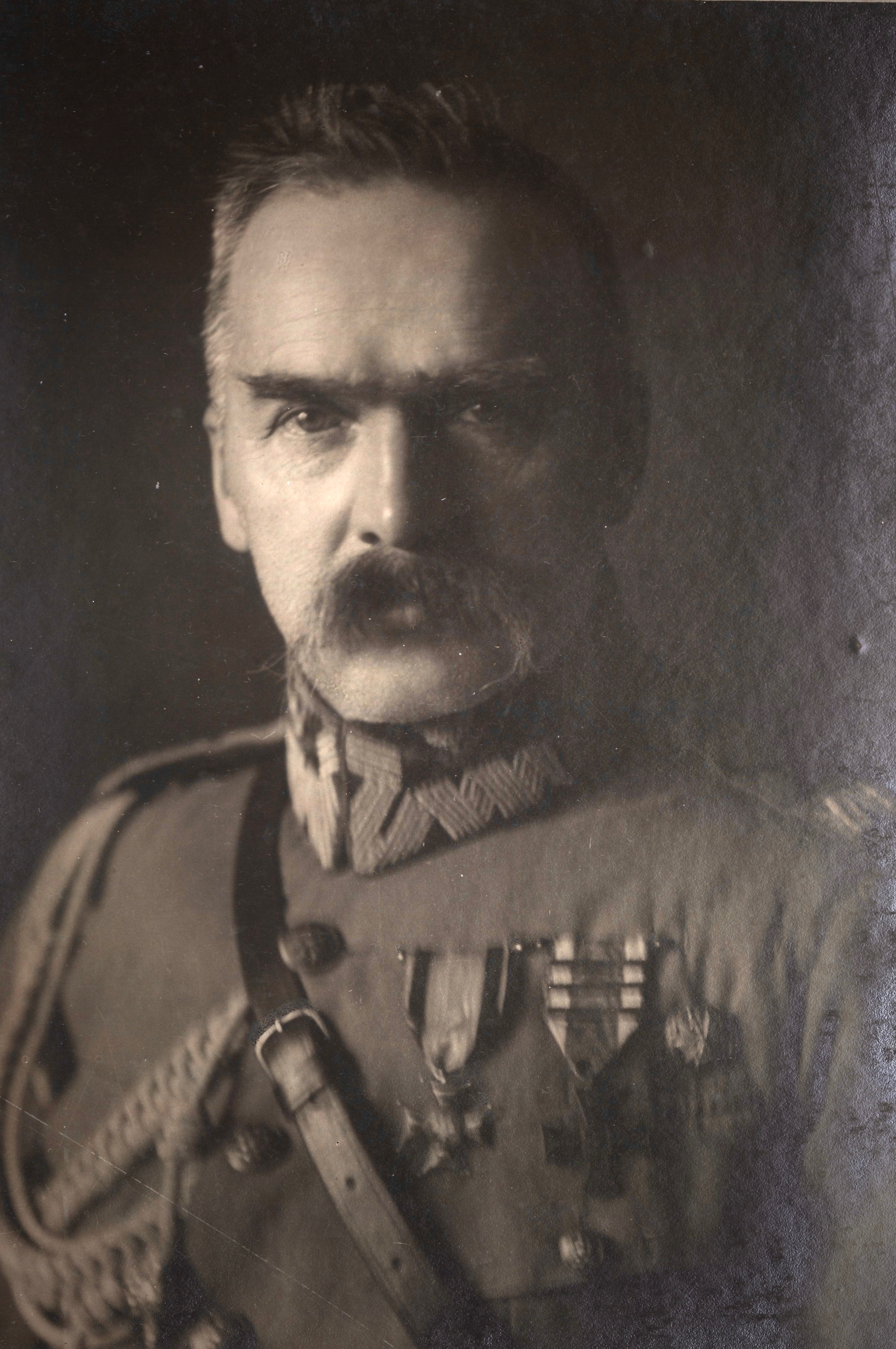
Jozef Pilsudski came to power in 1926 but is thought to have let the 1928 elections be mostly fair aside from some suppression in ethnically Belarusian regions. He received significant support from minority voters, especially the Jewish minority.

The combination of discrimination, Soviet interference, and the lack of a prior national movement radicalized Belarusian politics such that support for centre-left and minority interest parties gave way to the heaviest support for communists. Overall the 44% of the Orthodox vote that went to communists is estimated to also have included the Ukrainian Orthodox, who based on data from Volhynia and Polesia are estimated to have yielded 25% of their vote to communist parties, meaning the Belarusian level of support must have been higher than 44%. On the other hand, Uniate Ukrainians and Jews were mostly unconvinced by Soviet overtures. The Uniates instead held to minority interest parties. Among the Jewish population, support for minority parties fell from 65% in 1922 to 33%, while a plurality of Jews voted for Pilsudski's bloc. Despite the prevalent "Judeo-communist" myth, and although Jews were prominent in the leadership of communist institutions, 93% of Jews did not support communists at "the height of communist appeal" before Stalin consolidated absolute power, and furthermore only 14% of the communist vote came from Jews, less than the 16% which was from Catholics.

Instead, Jews were the strongest ethnic bastion of support for the Pilsudski government, moreso than both other minorities and the Polish majority, with no significant regional differences in the political behavior. Kopstein and Wittenberg argue their data show that "Even in the face of both public and private prejudice... Most Jews were thus politically neither "internationalist" nor ethnically exclusionary, as a large vote For the minority parties in 1928 would have in- dicated. Rather they were casting their lot with the Polish state." An alternative explanation holds instead that Jews turned to Pilsudski as a protector in an increasingly volatile political scene.

Estimates of voting patterns by ethnoreligious groups
Confession	Communists	Non-revolutionary left	Minority lists	Pro-Pilsudski bloc (BBWR)	Right-wing	Share in 1921 Census
Catholic	4%	45%	4%	16%	15%	64%
Uniate	12%	1%	71%	30%	3%	12%
Orthodox Chr.	44%	4%	21%	21%	1%	10%
Jewish	7%	4%	33%	49%	3%	11%
Overall share	8%	30%	24%	28%	10%	

== Aftermath ==
The BBWR government bloc won the highest number of seats (125 out of 444 in Sejm (Polish parliament) - 28.12% of the total, and 48 out of 111 in the Senate of Poland - 43.24% of the total); the opposition parties, however, gained a majority of the remaining seats, with the left - including Polish Communists - doing much better than the traditional Polish Right. Groth notes that the elections showed a progressively increasing fragmentation of the Polish electorate; a steady and significant increase in the proportion of ethnic minority voting; the rapid rise of the Polish Socialist Party as a major force within the less stable and cohesive Polish Left; and the substantial weakening of the Right by Piłsudski's supporters, as the BBWR, which despite its claims of being above traditional party divisions, attracted its support mostly from the right.

Although the opposition to Sanation failed to gain control of the Sejm, it was able to show its strength and prevent Sanation from taking control of the Sejm. This convinced Piłsudski and his supporters that more drastic measures had to be taken in dealing with the opposition. Opposition politicians became increasingly persecuted and threatened.

Opposition parties formed the Centrolew coalition to oppose the government of Sanation. Their actions led to a vote of no confidence for the Sanation government and dissolution of the parliament. New elections were held in 1930; however, Sanation succeeded in having many Centrolew politicians arrested; and the 1930 elections are not considered free.
