= Karol Polakiewicz =

Polish lawyer and politician

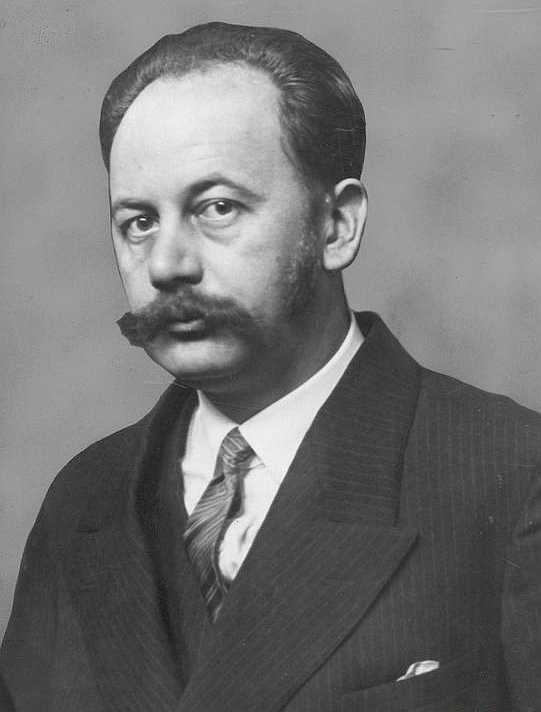
- Karol in March, 1928

Member of the Sejm during the Second Polish Republic

Personal details
- Born: 4 March 1893 Dublany, Galicia, Austria-Hungary
- Died: 4 September 1962 (aged 69) São Paulo, Brazil
- Party: PSL – Piast, Peasant Party, BBWR and OZN
- Education: University of Lwów, University of Oxford

Karol Polakiewicz (4 March 1893 – 4 September 1962) was a Polish lawyer and politician of various parties including PSL – Piast, the Peasant Party, BBWR and OZN, a captain in the Polish Army and a freemason.

== Early life ==
Polakiewicz was born on 4 March 1893 in Dublany, Galicia. His father Vladimir was a railroad official. He attended secondary schools in Kraków and Lviv. He graduated from the University of Lviv (though according to some sources it was actually Jagiellonian University). In 1916, he defended his doctorate there.

== Military career ==
After the outbreak of World War I, on 20 August 1914, he would join the Polish Legions. He would serve in the 3rd Brigade, 3rd and 4th infantry regiments. He would take part in the Carpathian campaign and the Battle of Mołotków and during this time he would graduate from cadet school. He would be seriously wounded on 31 August 1915 in the Battle of Jastków. Later he would be promoted to the rank of ensign and then he would be promoted again to second lieutenant and he would take part in the Volhynian campaign. He was wounded again at the Battle of Rudka Miryńska in 1916. During the Oath Crisis of 1917 he would spend 4 days in jail. He would also later be active in the Polish Military Organisation.

Upon the war's end, he would join the newly formed Polish army as a lieutenant and then as a captain commanding the 6th Company of the 4th Infantry Regiment in Kraków. Later he would be appointed the head of the DOK office, a political clerk. From June 1919, he served in the Second Department of Polish General Staff as head of the plebiscite section, chief of staff of the peace mission in Riga and deputy head of the political department. He ended his service on 1 January 1921, at his request, with the rank of major. Then he left for the United Kingdom to go to the University of Oxford, where he would study political economics for a year and a half.

== Political activities ==
As a representative of the Commander-in-Chief and the Minister of Military Affairs, he was a member of the Main Plebiscite Council within the Council of Ministers.

He started his political career as a member of the PSL - Piast. In 1922, he would enter the Sejm on behalf of this party, for the 5th District (which included Białystok, Wołkowysk and Sokółka). On 26 May 1923, he would leave the PSL - Piast, together with a group of Jan Dąbski's MPs, in protest against the party's entering into an alliance with National Democracy (the so-called Lanckorona Pact). He would join the parliamentary club of PSL – Jedność Ludowa. Later, Polakiewicz would act as one of the co-founders of the Peasant Party. From 1926 to 1928, he would sit on the General Council of this party. On 16 August 1927, he would be appointed president of the provincial board of SCh in Białystok. From 15 May to 15 June 1927, he would be the editor-in-chief of the SCh press organ, "Życie Chłopskiego" or in English, "Peasant Life".

In 1928, he would be expelled from the party ranks as he was an advocate of cooperation with the government camp. He joined the Non-Partisan Block of Cooperation with the Government (BBWR). On behalf of the BBWR, he became a member of the Sejm. From 1928 to 1937, he was president of the Union of People's Youth (prospective organisation). He also held several other roles and positions: vice-president of the Union of Polish Legionnaires (from 1936), president of the Quarterly Circle, president of the Union of Rural Municipalities of the Republic of Poland (from 1932), president of the Silesian Legion and a member of the Main Board of the Shooting Association.

In 1930, he was re-elected to the BBWR, for the 11th District. He was elected Deputy Marshal of the Sejm and Deputy Chairman of the BBWR Club.

On 13 February 1935, by a decision of the Civic Court, he was expelled from the BBWR. On 25 February, he resigned his parliamentary seat. Despite that, he would join the OZN upon its creation together with the ZML, which he managed.

After the outbreak of World War II, he would emigrate to Brazil. He would be active in the Polish community there and in 1948 he became the district secretary of the Union of Poles in Brazil in São Paulo.

== Honours and awards ==
- Silver Cross of the Order of Virtuti Militari.
- Cross of Independence
- Officer's Cross of the Order of Polonia Restituta
- The Cross of Valour four times
- The Cross on the Silesian Ribbon of Valour and Merit
