= PZL =

PZL, may refer to:

== Places ==
- PZL, an IATA airport code for Phinda Airfield in KwaZulu-Natal, South Africa
- PZL, a location code for the Złotów County, Greater Poland Voivodeship, Poland, in the system of the vehicle registration plates of Poland

== Technology ==
- Państwowe Zakłady Lotnicze (PZL), a defunct Poland-based aerospace manufacturer operating from 1928 to 1989
- PZL-Kalisz, a machinery and electronics manufacturer based in Poland
- PZL Mielec (Polskie Zakłady Lotnicze), an aerospace manufacturer based in Poland
- PZL-Świdnik, a helicopter manufacturer based in Poland

== Others ==
- Polish Hunting Union (Polish: Polski Związek Łowiecki, PZŁ), an organization of hunters in Poland
- Polish Union of Peasant Activists (Polish: Polski Związek Ludowców, PZL), a political party in Poland, operating from 1923 to 1924
