= Centrolew =

Centrolew Centrolew
- Leaders: Mieczysław Niedziałkowski; Jan Dąbski; Wincenty Witos; Maksymilian Malinowski; Karol Popiel
- Founded: 14 September 1929
- Dissolved: 1931
- Political position: Centre to left-wing
- Members: Polish Socialist Party; Peasant Party; Polish People's Party "Piast"; Polish People's Party "Wyzwolenie"; National Workers' Party

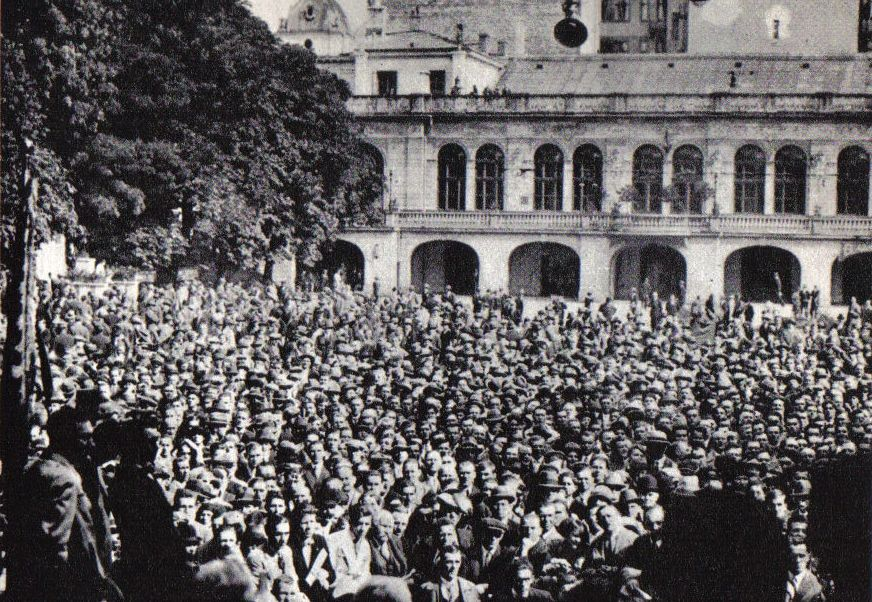
Centrolew rally in Warsaw, 15 September 1930

The Centrolew (Polish pronunciation: [t͡sɛnˈtrɔlɛf], 'Center-Left') was a coalition of several Polish political parties (Polish People's Party "Wyzwolenie", German Socialist Labour Party of Poland, Polish People's Party "Piast", National Workers' Party, Polish Socialist Party and Christian-democratic parties) after the 1928 parliamentary election. The coalition was directed against the Sanation government.

To counter the Centrolew, in the heated atmosphere prior to the 1930 election, Centrolew politicians were accused of planning a coup and subjected to repressions (most famously, imprisonment in the Brest Fortress, and the subsequent Brest trials). The Centrolew was defeated in the elections and broke up as a coalition.
