= Brest trials =

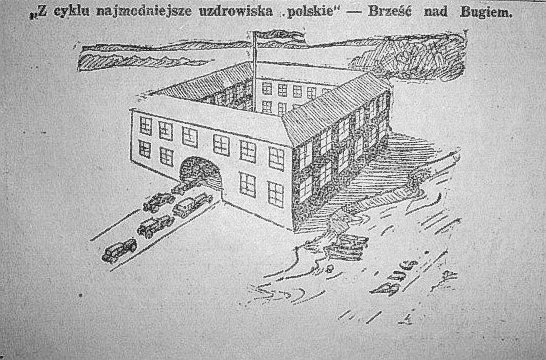
Satirical drawing from "Hasło Łódzkie" newspaper, 5 October 1930. The text: "From the series: 'Most popular Polish spa towns' - Brest-on-the-Bug." The picture is a reference to the Brest trial and the "Brest elections", when many Polish politicians of the Centrolew party were imprisoned in the Brest Fortress (pictured).

The Brest trials (Polish: Proces brzeski) were among the most famous trials conducted under the Second Polish Republic. Lasting from 26 October 1931 to 13 January 1932, they were held at the Warsaw Regional Court where leaders of the Centrolew, a "Center-Left" anti-Sanation-government political-opposition movement, were tried.

== Overview ==
The Polish Sanation government had invalidated the May 1930 election results by disbanding the parliament in August and with increasing pressure on the opposition started a new campaign, the new elections being scheduled for November. Using anti-government demonstrations as a pretext, 20 members of the opposition, including most of the leaders of the Centrolew alliance (from Polish Socialist Party, Polish People's Party "Piast" and Polish People's Party "Wyzwolenie") were arrested in September without a warrant, only strictly on the order of Józef Piłsudski and the then Minister of Internal Security, Felicjan Sławoj Składkowski, accusing them of plotting an anti-government coup.

The opposition members (who included the former prime minister Wincenty Witos, and Wojciech Korfanty) were imprisoned in the Brest Fortress, where their trial took place (thus the popular name for the election: the 'Brest election'). A number of less known activists were also arrested throughout the country. They were released after the end of the election in the same month. The Brest trial ended in January 1932, with 10 accused receiving sentences up to three years of imprisonment; the appeals of 1933 confirmed the sentences. The government however gave the accused the choice of emigrating: five of them did so, the other five stayed on in Poland to serve the prison term instead.

| L.p. | Accused | Party allegiance | Defender(s) | Sentence |
|---|---|---|---|---|
| 1. | Herman Lieberman | PPS | Eugeniusz Śmiarowski, Ludwik Honigwill, Leopold Potok | 2.5 years |
| 2. | Norbert Barlicki | PPS | Leon Berenson, Zygmunt Nagórski | 2.5 years |
| 3. | Stanisław Dubois | PPS | Stanisław Benkiel, Kazimierz Sterling | 3 years |
| 4. | Mieczysław Mastek | PPS | Mieczysław Rudziński, Wacław Barcikowski | 3 years |
| 5. | Adam Pragier | PPS | Leon Berenson, Jan Nowodworski | 3 years |
| 6. | Adam Ciołkosz | PPS | Jan Dąbrowski, Antoni Landau | 3 years |
| 7. | Wincenty Witos | PSL "Piast" | Stanisław Szurlej | 1.5 years |
| 8. | Władysław Kiernik | PSL "Piast" | Stefan Urbanowicz | 2.5 years |
| 9. | Kazimierz Bagiński | PSL "Wyzwolenie" | E. Śmiarowski, Zygmunt Graliński | 2 years |
| 10. | Józef Putek | PSL "Wyzwolenie" | Wacław Szumański, Mieczysław Jarosz (from 02.11.1931), Zygmunt Graliński | 3 years |
| 11. | Adolf Sawicki | SCh | Kazimierz Ujazdowski, Tomasz Czernicki | declared innocent |
