= Nonpartisan Bloc for Cooperation with the Government =

Nonpartisan Bloc for Cooperation with the Government Bezpartyjny Blok Współpracy z Rządem
- Chairman: Walery Sławek
- Founded: November 1927; 98 years ago
- Dissolved: 30 October 1935; 90 years ago
- Headquarters: Warsaw, Poland
- Ideology: Sanacja: Palingenesis; Presidentialism; Civic nationalism; State nationalism; Guided democracy; Anti-politics; Anti-corruption
- Political position: Big tent

The Nonpartisan Bloc for Cooperation with the Government (Polish: Bezpartyjny Blok Współpracy z Rządem, pronounced [bɛsparˈtɨjnɨ ˈblɔk fspuwˈpratsɨ z ˈʐɔ̃dɛm]; abbreviated BBWR) was a "non-political" organization in the interwar Second Polish Republic, in 1927–35. It was closely affiliated with Józef Piłsudski and his Sanation movement. Its major activists included Walery Sławek, Kazimierz Bartel, Kazimierz Świtalski, Aleksander Prystor, Józef Beck, Janusz Jędrzejewicz, Wacław Jędrzejewicz, Adam Koc, Leon Kozłowski, Ignacy Matuszewski, Bogusław Miedziński, Bronisław Pieracki, Adam Skwarczyński, and Janusz Franciszek Radziwiłł.

In 1993, Lech Wałęsa, then President of Poland, founded a Nonpartisan Bloc for Support of Reforms, in Polish Bezpartyjny Blok Wspierania Reform, likewise abbreviated "BBWR," which was meant to revive some of the traditions of the prewar "BBWR" and to form a parliamentary grouping explicitly supportive of President Wałęsa. In the 1993 elections, the new "BBWR" achieved limited success, capturing 5.41% of the vote.

== BBWR in 1928–35 ==
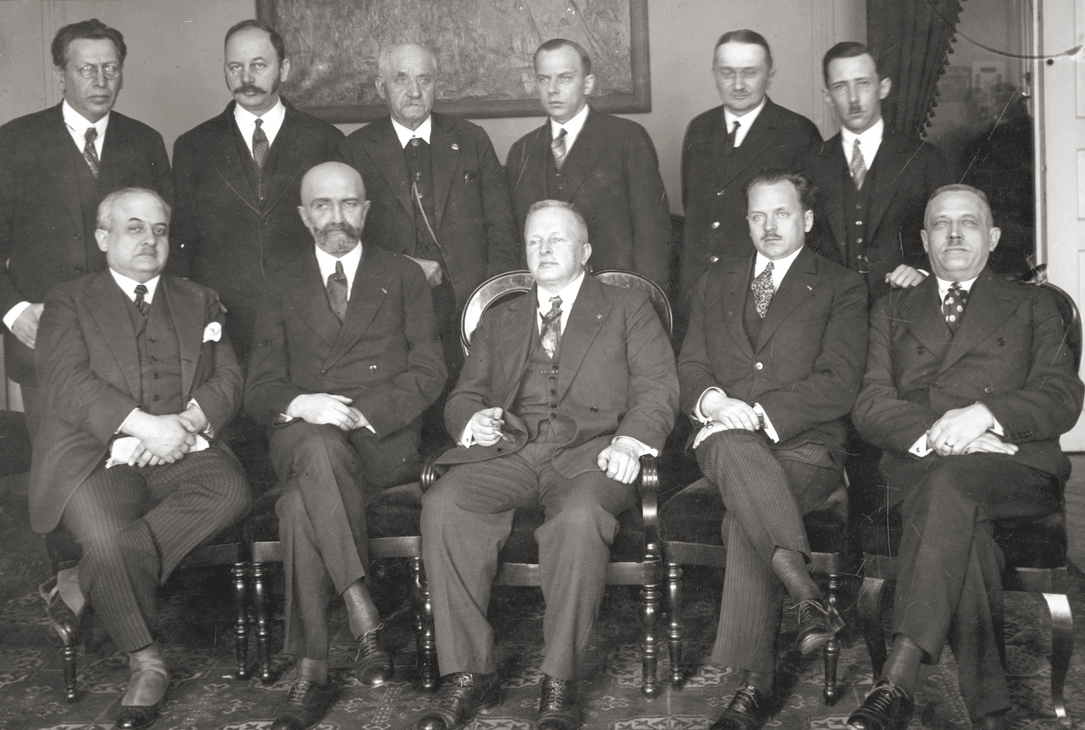
The Presidium of the BBWR visiting the Marshal of the Senate Julian Szymański in 1929. From the left: sitting: Hipolit Gliwic, Walery Sławek, Julian Szymański, Marian Zyndram-Kościałkowski, Walery Roman; standing: Henryk Loewenherz, Karol Polakiewicz, Jakub Bojko, Zdzisław Stroński, Zdzisław Lechnicki, Adam Piasecki

The BBWR was created in November 1927, by Walery Sławek, at the urging of Józef Piłsudski. The organization consisted of several smaller parties, including those representing national minorities. Also, a few deputies of the Polish Socialist Party and PSL Piast decided to join the new movement. The BBWR was not a classic political party, as it consisted of people with sometimes very different opinions. They were united by the personality of Piłsudski, whom they supported, and the BBWR had several targets: to carry out changes in the constitution, to keep the National Democracy political movement away from the parliament, and to attract conservatives and business circles.

The political program of the BBWR was announced on January 19, 1928. It was based on the following principles:

- the cult of Józef Piłsudski,
- criticism of party favouritism, which had a destructive influence on the condition of the state,
- the need to change the constitution, with more power in the hands of the president and limiting the powers of the parliament,
- social solidarism.

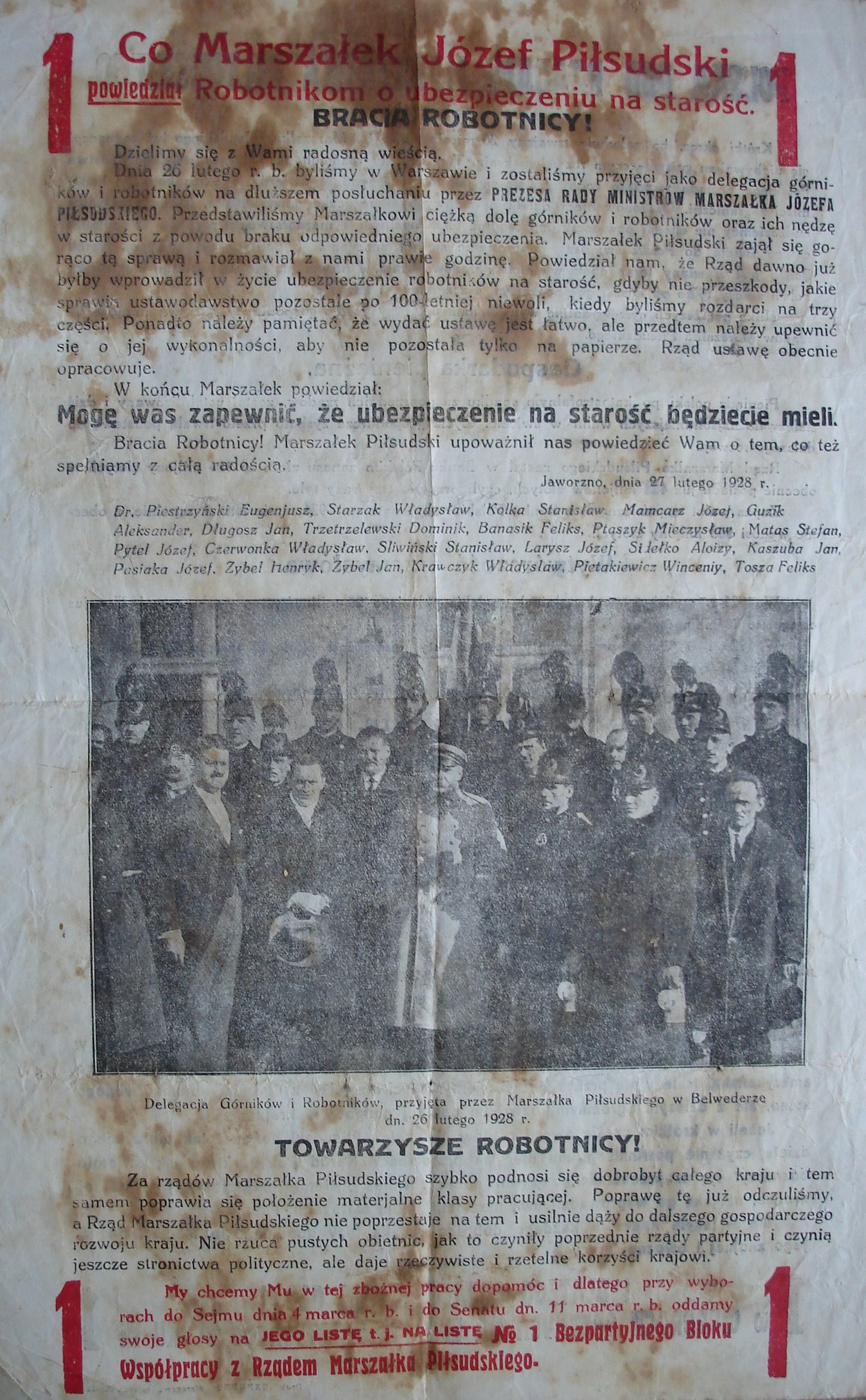
Election leaflet

During the 1928 election campaign, which took place in March, the BBWR won 130 seats in the Sejm (out of 444), and 46 seats in the Senate (out of 111). On June 28, 1928, the government of Prime Minister Kazimierz Bartel was created. Even though the movement did not have a majority in the Polish Parliament, Józef Piłsudski regarded his party as the winner. Still, to his surprise, left-wing politician Ignacy Daszyński was chosen the speaker of the Sejm.

On April 14, 1929, Bartel's government was replaced by the more radical government of Kazimierz Świtalski. It was based on the so-called “group of colonels”, who were personal friends of Piłsudski. On December 6, 1929, the Sejm passed the motion of no confidence, and Bartel replaced Świtalski. The new government was dissolved on March 29, 1930, and the new Prime Minister was Walery Sławek. In response, opposition parties united, creating the so-called Centrolew, and organizing a mass anti-government demonstration in Kraków, on June 29, 1930. On August 25, 1930, Józef Piłsudski took the post of Prime Minister, and on September 9, the first arrests of opposition politicians took place. The parliament was dissolved, and the opposition leaders were imprisoned in the Brest Fortress.

In the 1930 election, which was also called the “Brest election”, the BBWR won 249 seats in the Sejm, and 75 in the Senate. On December 4, 1930, the second government of Walery Sławek was created. It existed until May 1930, when Aleksander Prystor became a new Prime Minister. Facing the financial crisis (see Great Depression), Prystor decided to cut public spending in order to balance the budget. In 1933, a program of public works was created to reduce widespread unemployment. Furthermore, in 1932 - 1933, the BBWR government carried out significant educational reform. Simultaneously, oppositional activities were curbed, following three new bills, which limited the means of street protests and possibilities of creating new movements (see also Brest trials).

In the summer of 1933, Prystor lost the confidence of Józef Piłsudski and was replaced by Janusz Jedrzejowicz. At the same time, Piłsudski and his subordinates began drafting the April Constitution, and on May 15, 1934, the new government of Leon Kozłowski was created. In June of the same year, Minister of Internal Affairs Bronisław Pieracki was murdered by the Organization of Ukrainian Nationalists. The government in response opened the Bereza Kartuska detention camp.

After the death of Józef Piłsudski (May 12, 1935), the weakened BBWR continued to exist until October 30, when Walery Sławek dissolved it. The tradition of the movement was continued by the Camp of National Unity, formed in February 1937.

== Aftermath ==
The Nonpartisan Bloc for Support of Reforms (Bezpartyjny Blok Wspierania Reform, also abbreviated BBWR), was founded to continue the traditions of pre-war Nonpartisan Bloc for Cooperation with the Government. Its creation was announced by Lech Wałęsa on June 1, 1993, during a press conference in the garden of the Belweder. The movement was registered on October 30, 1993. It was a political party, supposed to provide Wałęsa with support in the Parliament. In the 1993 election, the BBWR won 5.41% of votes, or 8 seats (16 in the Sejm, 2 in the Senate). Disappointed with this result, Wałęsa began to disassociate himself from the organization.

The BBWR continued to exist until 1997. It supported Wałęsa in the 1995 presidential election, after which the party was split into several factions - the BBWR - Bloc for Poland (BBWR - Blok dla Polski), BBWR - United in Election (BBWR - Solidarni w Wyborach), New Poland (Nowa Polska), Republican Party (Partia Republikanie), and National Party of Retirees (Krajowa Partia Emerytow i Rencistow). In December 1997, Wałęsa created the Christian Democracy of the 3rd Polish Republic.

== Election results ==
=== Sejm ===
Election	Votes	Vote share	Seats	Change in seats	Seat share	Change in seat share
1928	2,399,438	21% (1st)	125 / 444	▲125	28%	▲28%
1930	5,292,725	47% (1st)	249 / 444	▲124	56%	▲28%
1935	6,118,695	87% (1st)	181 / 206	not comparable due to reapportionment	88%	▲32%

== See also ==
- Camp of National Unity
- National Radical Camp (1934)
- Adam Czerniakow
- Common Organization of the Society

== Sources ==
- Krystyna Paszkiewicz: Partie i koalicje polityczne III Rzeczypospolitej. Wroclaw: Wydawnictwo Uniwersytetu Wroclawskiego, 2000, s. 13-16. ISBN 8322920512.
