= Agrarian Union =

'Agrarian Union may refer to:

- Agrarian Union "Aleksandar Stamboliyski", a political party in Bulgaria
- Agrarian Union (Poland)
- Centre Party (Finland) (former name Maalaisliitto, "Agrarian Union").
