= Walery Roman =

Polish lawyer and politician

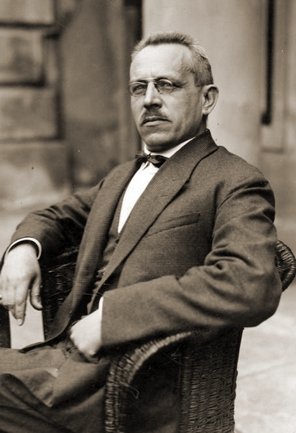

Voivode of Polesie Voivodeship
- In office 14 March 1921 – 3 May 1922
- Preceded by: Position created
- Succeeded by: Stanisław Downarowicz

Member of the II and III Senate of Poland
- In office 1928–1935

Personal details
- Born: September 12, 1877 Kalwaria, Suwałki Governorate
- Died: 25 October 1952 (aged 75) Warsaw, Polish People's Republic
- Party: BBWR
- Education: University of Warsaw
- Awards: Order of Polonia Restituta

Walery Roman (12 September 1877-25 October 1952) was a Polish lawyer and politician. His early government career was related to the creation of the Regency Kingdom. He was a supporter of Józef Piłsudski. In the aftermath of World War I he was involved in the establishment of Polish judiciary in the Suwałki Region, and negotiations between Poland, Lithuania and Germany (Ober-Ost); in 1921 received the honorary citizenship of Suwałki. Voivode of the Polesie Voivodeship from 1921 to 1922, Polish government's delegate to Republic of Central Lithuania in 1922-1924 during the region's transformation into the Wilno Voivodeship. Participant of Piłsudski's May Coup of 1926; deputy to Polish parliament from sanacja's the Nonpartisan Bloc for Cooperation with the Government (BBWR) party until 1935. He retired from politics afterwards, and continued his career as a lawyer until 1950.
