= Herman Lieberman =

Polish lawyer and politician

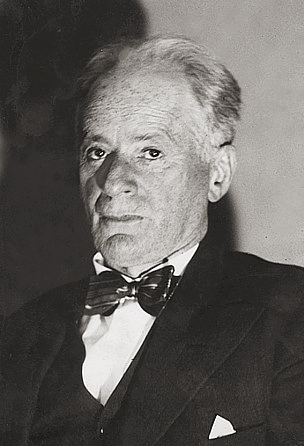
- Herman Lieberman, 1931, during Brest trials

Minister of Justice of the Polish government-in-exile
- In office 3 September 1941 – 21 October 1941
- Preceded by: Marian Seyda
- Succeeded by: Karol Popiel

Member of the Legislative Sejm
- In office 1919–1922

Personal details
- Born: 4 January 1870 Drohobycz, Galicia, Austro-Hungary
- Died: 21 October 1941 (aged 71) London, England
- Party: Polish Socialist Party
- Awards: Order of the White Eagle; Cross of Valour

Herman Lieberman (4 January 1870 – 21 October 1941) was a Polish lawyer and socialist politician.

== Life ==
Lieberman was born into a Jewish family in Drohobycz, Galicia, then part of Austro-Hungary. From 1907 to 1914 and from 1917 to 1918, he was a member of parliament in Vienna.

During World War I he joined the Polish Legions of Józef Piłsudski as a private. He was promoted to the rank of lieutenant and took part in the Battle of Kostiuchnówka, for which he was awarded the Polish Cross of Valor. During the Oath crisis, when Polish troops refused to swear allegiance to Emperor Wilhelm II of Germany, Lieberman served as the lawyer for the Polish soldiers who were charged with treason by the German authorities.

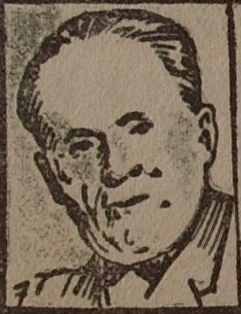
Sketch of Lieberman at Brest trials

After World War I Lieberman became a leader of the Polish Socialist Party (PPS), serving on its executive committee. In January 1919 he became a member of the Polish Sejm (parliament). In 1923 he successfully defended the Kraków workers charged in the aftermath of the 1923 Kraków riot.

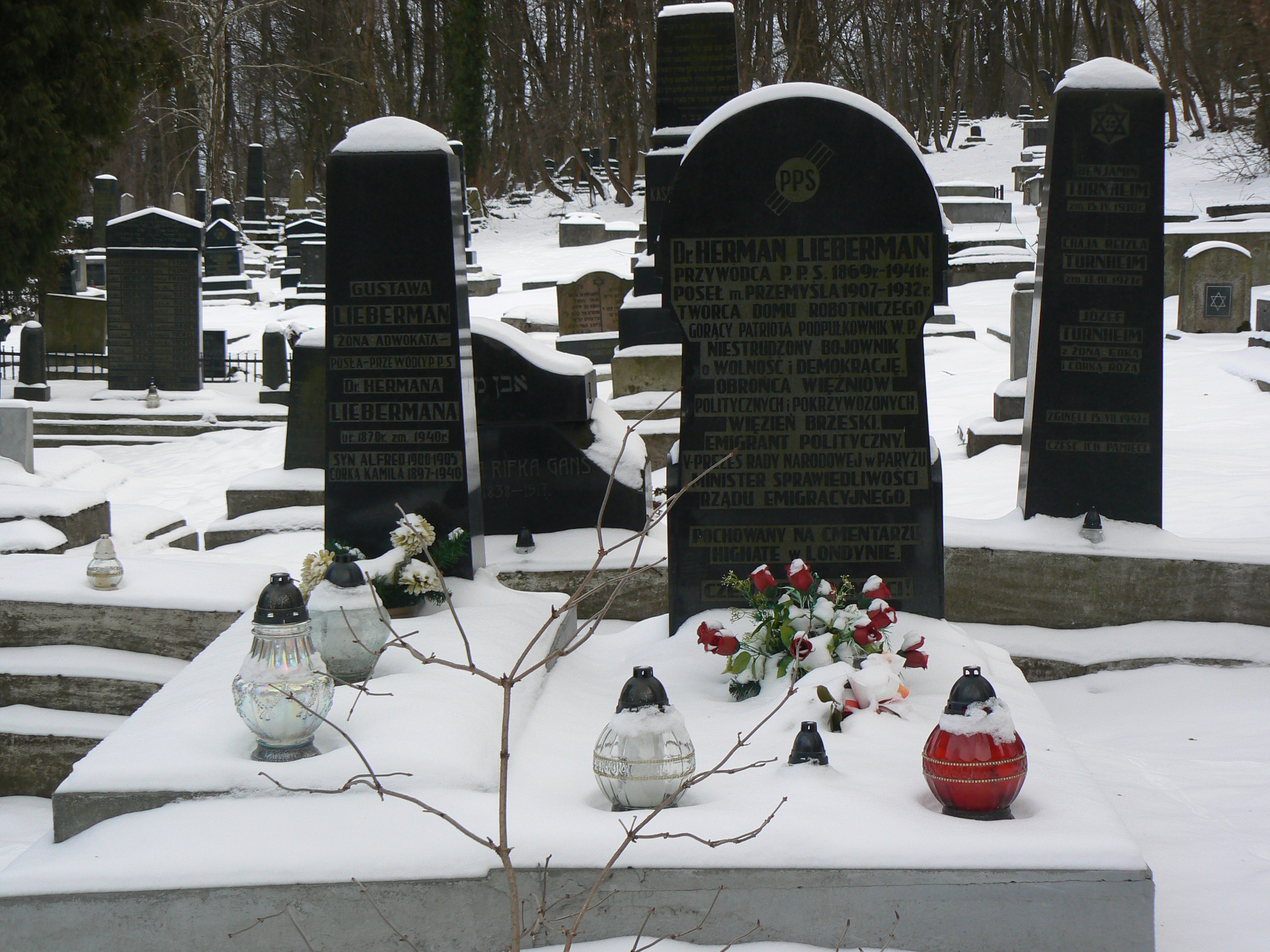
Lieberman's cenotaph at the new Jewish cemetery in Przemyśl

After the May 1926 Coup d'État, he opposed Piłsudski. He was arrested and beaten by the police and then sentenced in the 1931–32 Brest trials to two and a half year in prison. Rather than serving the sentence he emigrated to France. While abroad he supported the republican cause in the Spanish Civil War and published a critical response to Marcel Déat's pamphlet Why Die for Danzig? which advocated appeasement of Hitler.

During World War II, after the 1939 German invasion of Poland, Lieberman joined Władysław Sikorski's Polish government-in-exile in London, England. From 3 September 1941 to 20 October 1941, Lieberman was the government's minister of justice. He died in 1941.

=== Award ===
In 1941 Lieberman was posthumously awarded Poland's highest decoration, the Order of the White Eagle, by the President of the Government in Exile Władysław Raczkiewicz, in recognition of his exceptional services to Poland.
