= Mieczysław Niedziałkowski =

Polish politician, socialist activist and writer

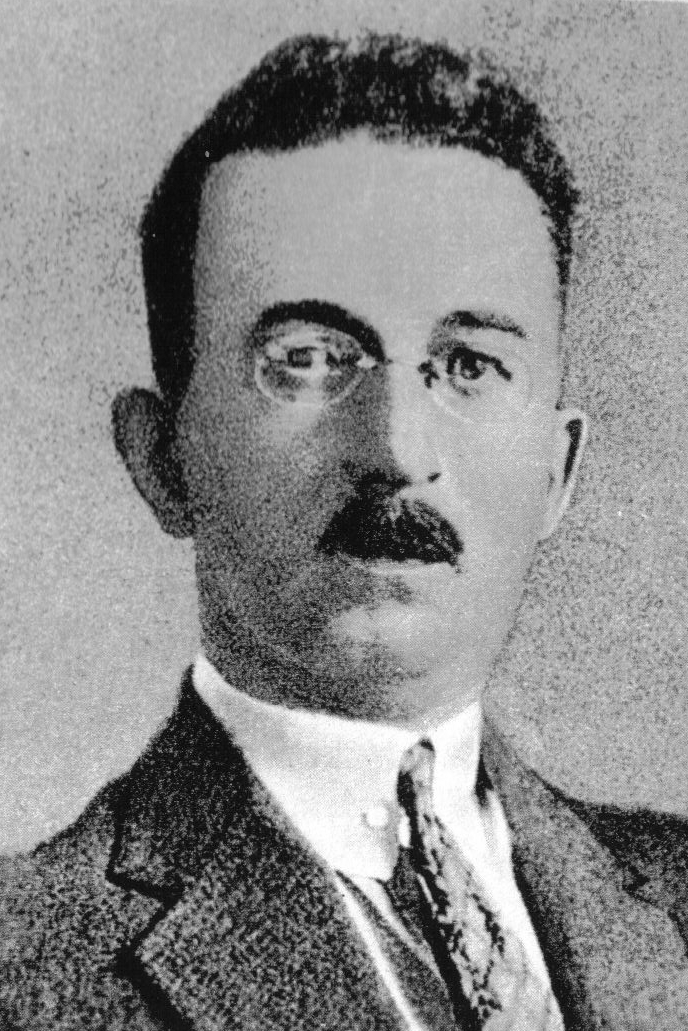

Personal details
- Born: September 19, 1893 Vilnius, Vilna Governorate
- Died: June 21, 1940 (aged 46) Palmiry, General Government
- Party: Polish Socialist Party
- Other political affiliations: Centrolew
- Occupation: Politician, activist, writer, journalist

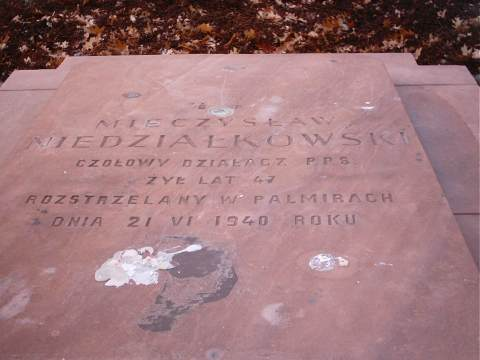
Niedziałkowski's tombstone

Mieczysław Niedziałkowski (September 19, 1893 in Vilnius – June 21, 1940 in Palmiry) was a Polish politician and writer. He was an activist in the Polish Socialist Party, editor in chief of Robotnik, and one of the primary activists and cofounders of the Centrolew alliance. He published several works on socialism and Polish politics. He took part in the defence of Warsaw in 1939 against the Nazi German aggression, organizing the volunteer militias. He was subsequently arrested and interrogated by the German secret police (Gestapo). He was shot dead on 21 June 1940 in Palmiry during the German AB-Aktion.

After his arrest by the Gestapo. Niedziałkowski was personally interviewed by Heinrich Himmler, who asked "What do you want from us; what do you expect?" Niedziałkowski responded "From you I neither want nor demand anything. With you I fight."
