= Stefania Zahorska =

Polish art historian (1890–1961)

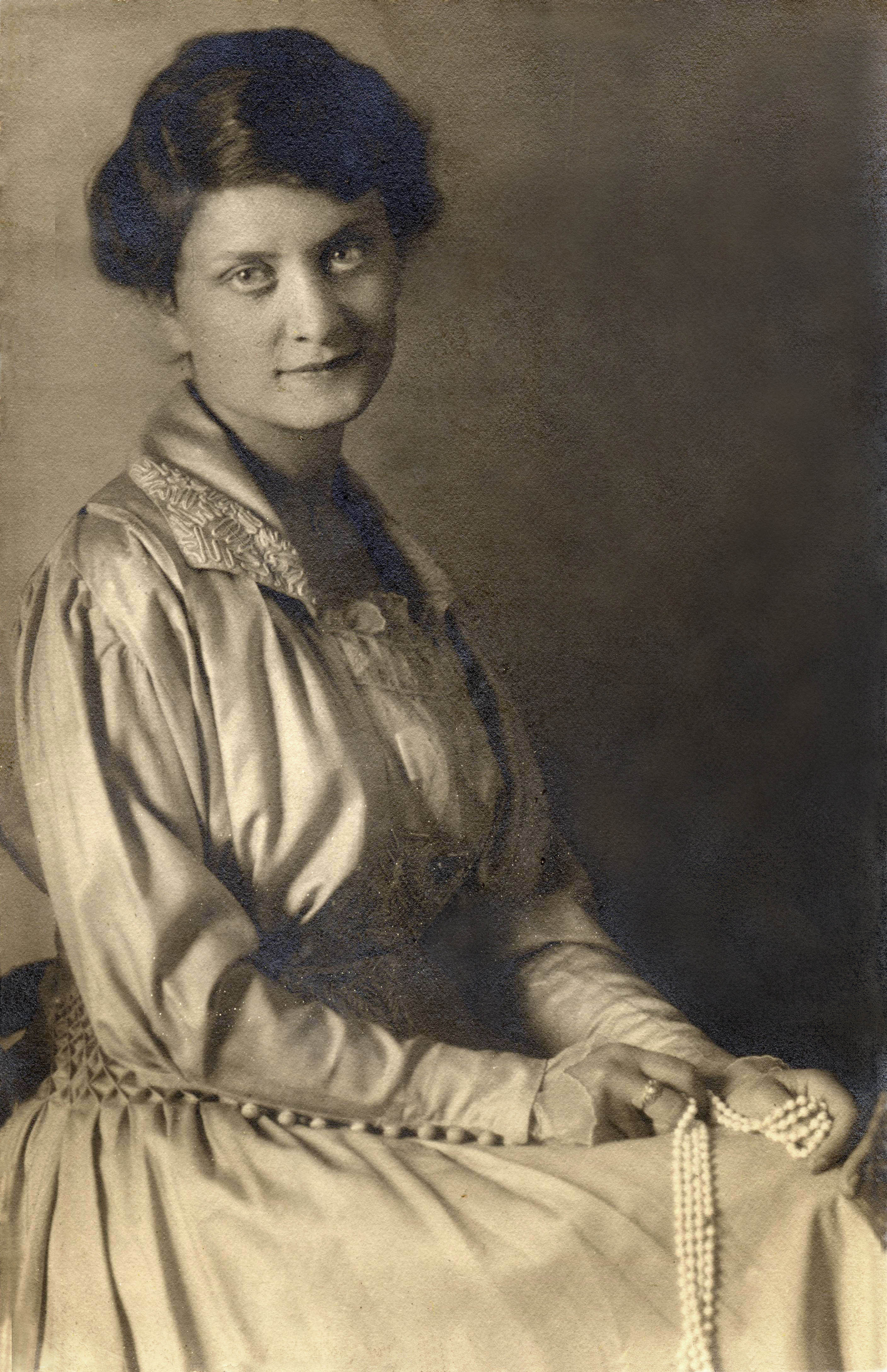

Stefania Zahorska (25 April 1889 – 6 April 1961), pseudonym Pandora, was a Polish art historian, writer, and publicist. She was one of the most highly respected, widely read, and influential Polish film critics during the interwar period.

== Early life ==
Zahorska was born Stefania Ernestyna Leser in Kraków (then part of Austria-Hungary) to a family of assimilated, middle class Polish Jews; some sources have put her year of birth as 1890. Her mother died when she was a teenager and she moved to Budapest to live with her older sister Helena. In addition to Polish and Hungarian, she also became fluent in English, French, and German.

Zahorska entered medical school where she studied for two or three years, before dropping out and enrolling in the art history department at Jagiellonian University in Krakow. Her dissertation focused on the aesthetics of the early Polish Enlightenment. During her university studies, she married Bohdan Zahorski, an officer in one of Józef Piłsudski's officer legions. After completing her PhD, Zahorska moved to Warsaw in what was now the newly independent Second Polish Republic where she took a position as an assistant professor of art history at the Free Polish University (Wolna Wszechnica Polska); shortly afterwards, her marriage dissolved after her husband left her for another woman in the 1920s while suffering from Parkinson's disease. Zahorski later committed suicide, which deeply influenced Zahorska's novel Korzenie, written a decade later.

== Career ==
In the years 1924–1925, she was director of the art section of Przegląd Warszawski. She was the permanent collaborator of Wiadomości Literackie, professor at the Wolna Wszechnica Polska in Warsaw, and co-founder of the Polish Writers Association Ltd in London. She also organized the Berlin-based magazine Porza, an outlet from the Porza Association, in Poland, which was founded by her close friend Arthur Bryks.

=== Film criticism ===
Zahorska began writing film criticism in the early 1930s for the weekly magazine Wiadomości Literackie; she worked up until the outbreak of World War II and published over 500 film reviews. Her column in the Wiadomosci Literackie was titled "Film Chronicle" ("Kronika filmowa"), later renamed as "Nowe filmy" ("New Films). She was a pioneer in the young field of film criticism in Poland, noting the "military romanticism" and "exaggerated melodrama" as the two dominating themes in Polish cinema. She noted that if such films "were to be shown abroad (and they shouldn't be) they would present to the amazed world a Poland still immersed in the madness of war, its high excitement, and military idealisms". She was a leader in the fight against parochialism in both Polish cinema and Poland itself. Her reviews could be scathing and controversial. She wrote of the 1937 Yiddish film The Dybbuk that it left such "an insipid residue of pathetic kitsch that all the traditions on which it is based have not given birth to even one good scene"; The Dybbuk is recognized as a supreme achievement of both Yiddish film-making and as a masterpiece of European cinema.

In 1934, she traveled throughout the Soviet Union where she attended seminars at the Gerasimov Institute of Cinematography in Moscow. Her most influential and best known work was the essay "What the novel owes film", in which she argued that film, a relatively new medium, played a role in developing the contemporary literary metaphor, making it more sensual and dynamic as a response to film.

Zahorska became the partner and literary collaborator of the Polish exiled activist and writer, Adam Pragier. She lived in France from 1939 to 1940, when she moved to the UK. From 1950 onward, she and Pragier co-authored a column "Puszka Pandory" (Pandora's Box) for Wiadomości Literackie. She died in London.

== Works ==
Zahorska was an author of Matejko (1925), Eugeniusz Żak (1927), Szczęśliwe oczy. Wybór studiów i esejów z dziedziny filozofii, historii i krytyki sztuk plastycznych z lat 1921-1960 (published posthumously in London, 1970); the play Smocza 13; novels Stacja Abbesses (Tonbridge, 1952), Ziemia pojona gniewem (London, 1961), Ofiara (The Offering), and Korzenie; memoirs Warszawa - Lwów 1939 (London, 1964).
