= Polish Union of Peasant Activists =

Former political party in Poland operating from 1923 to 1924

- Leader: Jan Bryl
- Founded: 1923
- Dissolved: 1924
- Split from: Polish People's Party "Piast"
- Succeeded by: Agrarian Union
- Headquarters: Warsaw
- Newspaper: Sprawa Chłopska
- Ideology: Agrarianism

The Polish Union of Peasant Activists (Polish: Polski Związek Ludowców, PZL) was an agrarian party that operated in Poland from 1923 to 1924. Its leader was Jan Bryl. The party was formed in 1923 by separating from the Polish People's Party "Piast", and functioned until 1924, when it united with the Polish People's Party "Left", forming the Agrarian Union. It published Sprawa Chłopska newspapers.
