= Adam Pragier =

Polish socialist (1886–1976)

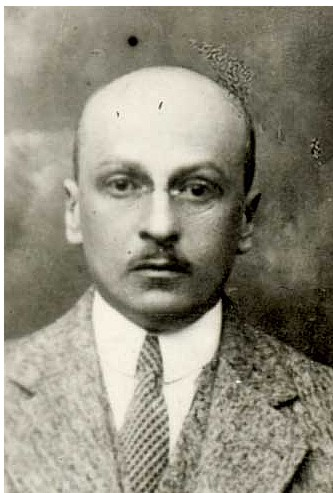
- Adam Szymon Pragier
- Born: Adam Szymon Pragier; 12 December 1886; Warsaw, Poland
- Died: 24 July 1976 (aged 89); Penley, Wales
- Education: Bartłomiej Nowodworski High School, University of Zurich PhD
- Occupations: Professor Free Polish University, Member of the Sejm (1922-1930), Minister of Information in London exile
- Employer: Polish Polish government-in-exile
- Known for: Czas Przeszły Dokonany - "The Past Perfect. Lives and Times" (1966)
- Spouses: Eugenia Pragierowa (1912-1939), Stefania Zahorska
- Awards: Cross and Order Odrodzenia Polski, Medal Niepodleglosci

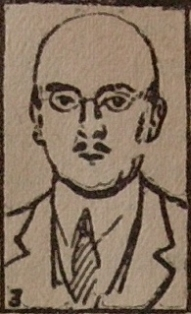
Adam Pragier – sketch published in the paper "Rozwój", 4 November 1931 during the Brest trials.

Adam Szymon Pragier (12 December 1886 – 24 July 1976) was a Polish economist, Doctor of Jurisprudence professor at the Free Polish University, socialist activist, politician, member of the Polish Legions and writer. A minister of information and documentation in the Polish government-in-exile in London, he upheld for the rest of his life its legal continuity in the struggle for the restoration of Poland as a sovereign state.

== Early life ==
Pragier was born into a well-to-do family of Jewish descent. His father, Stanisław, was a medical practitioner, and his mother, Józefa, was a member of the Szancer family. After home education in Warsaw, he was sent as a boarder to the prestigious St Anne's Academy in Kraków, where Jozef Retinger would have been a younger contemporary and where he joined the left leaning youth organisation, "Promień".

He graduated from high school in 1904 and went on to the Jagiellonian University Medical College and joined the socialist "Spójna" group. He was allied to the Warsaw-based Polish Socialist Party. After a year, he transferred to the medical department of the University of Zurich, where he was a member of the PPS abroad and soon became its leader. After the 1906 split in the party, he was active in the Polish Socialist Party-Left faction.

== Prewar career ==
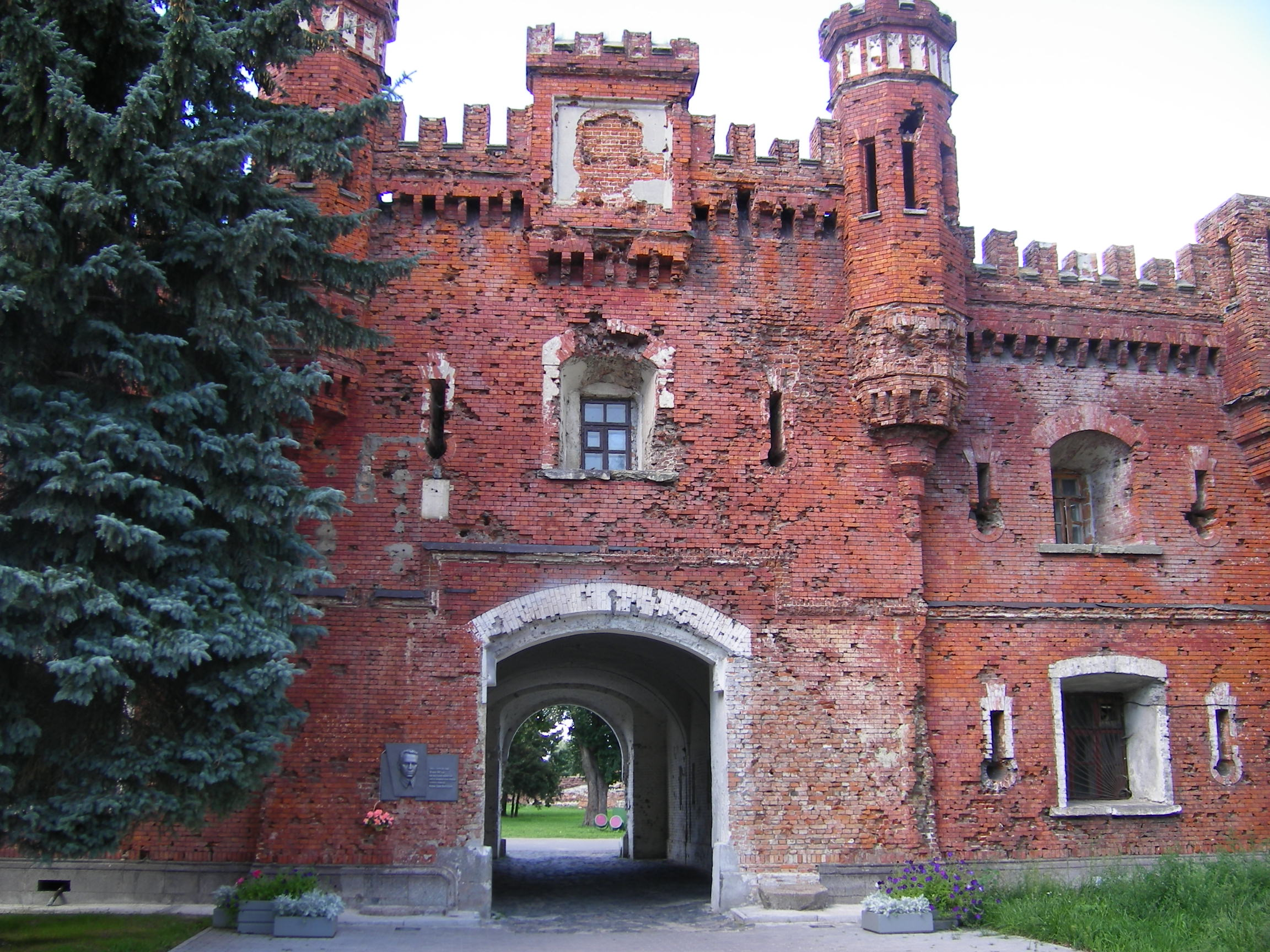
Brest Fortress, scene of the political Brest trials 1931

In 1907–1908, he was editor of the review, "Myśl Socjalistyczna" ("Socialist Thought"). Having obtained a basic medical degree to satisfy his parents, he switched to his abiding interest, political economy, and obtained his PhD at Zurich University in 1910, with a thesis in German, Die Produktivgenossenschaften der schweizerischen Arbeiter (Manufacturing Cooperatives run by Swiss Workers). In 1914, he gave the first critique in the Polish language of Rosa Luxemburg's The Accumulation of Capital, published in the periodical Ekonomista.

When the Great War broke out, he volunteered for the Polish Legions but was discharged from service because of a heart complaint. After his convalescence, he was called up by the Austro-Hungarian Army to serve at a garrison in Ostrawa. In 1918, he became a member of the Polish Military Organisation in Kraków.

In April 1919, he rejoined the PPS and he became a professor at the Free Polish University. From 1922 to 1930, he was elected to the Sejm during the first term (1922–1927), followed by re-election to the second term (1928–1930). From 1921 to 1937, he was a member of the Executive Council of the PPS. In 1930, he was arrested along with a dozen other socialist leaders and held at the Brest Fortress, as part of the Sanation government's manoeuvre to clamp down on the opposition under accusations of an attempted coup. At the Brest trials, he was convicted and sentenced to three years in prison. However, he was given the option of going into exile. From 1933 to 1935, he was exiled in Paris and later returned to Poland and gave himself up for incarceration, which was commuted to several months during 1935.

== Invasion of Poland and exile ==
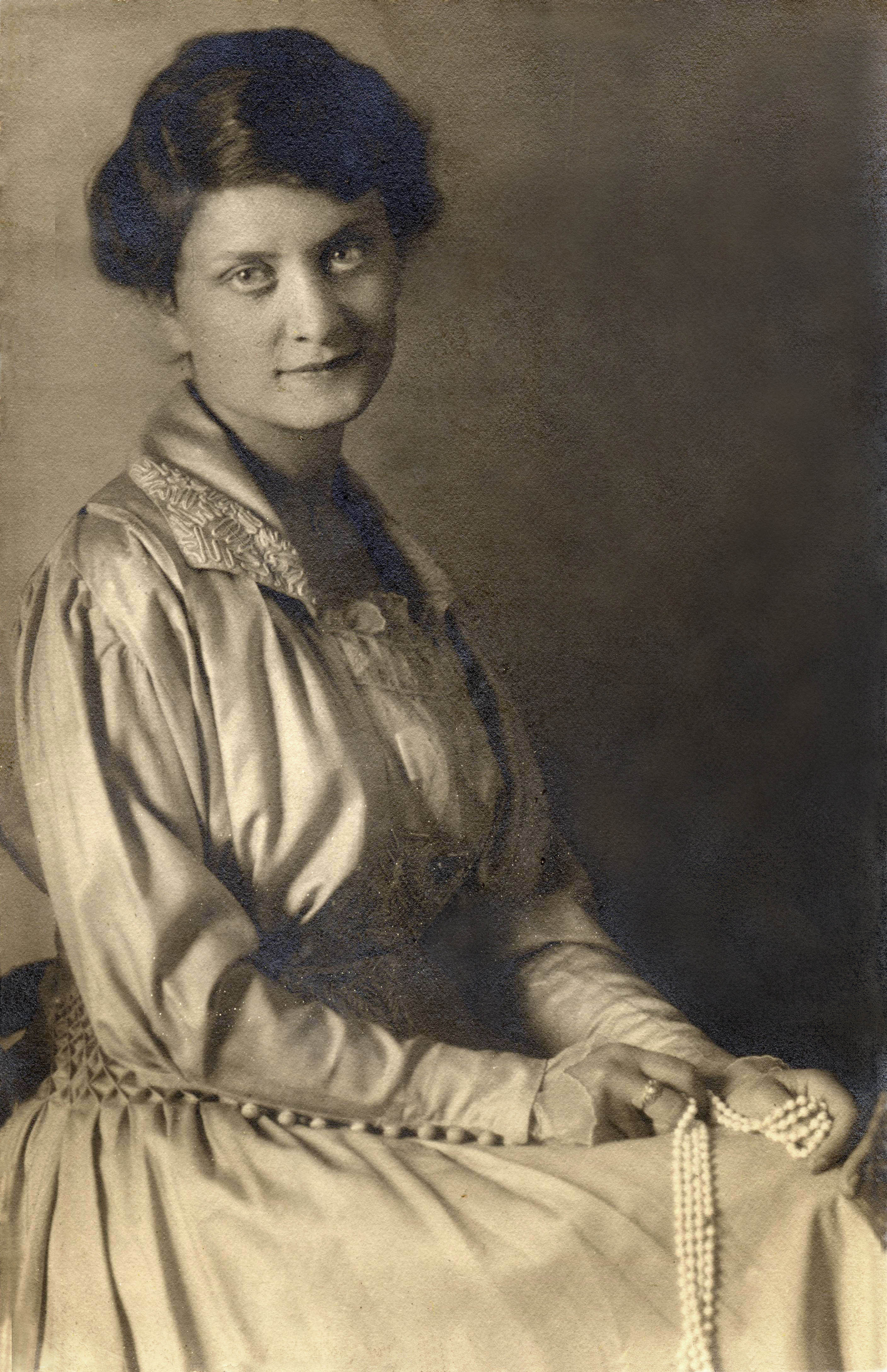
Stefania Zahorska Pragier's partner and literary collaborator in London

Following the German and Soviet invasion of Poland in 1939, he was once again in France from where he escaped to the United Kingdom. He participated in the formation on 30 September 1939 of the Second Wladyslaw Sikorski government to ensure the continuity of the Second Polish Republic's authority after the internment in the Kingdom of Romania of President Ignacy Mościcki and his government on 18 September 1939. From 3 November 1942 he was a member of the Polish Polish National Council, which acted in place of an elected parliament. From 1944 to 1949, he was Minister of Information in the administrations led by Tomasz Arciszewski and by Tadeusz Komorowski.

On the termination of President August Zaleski's term of office, he sided with him in opposition to the Rada Trzech (Council of Three) and remained loyal to him to the end, in spite of their fundamental political differences. From 1941 to 1947, he was a member of the Foreign Affairs Committee of the PPS. He was dismissed from the PPS in exile in 1946. From 1947 he was leader of the Union of Polish Socialists Abroad. From 1949 to 1951, he was recalled to the Polish National Council. From 1954 to 1970, he was on the Council of the Government in exile, serving as its chairman between 1963 and 1968.

He was a regular contributor to Mieczysław Grydzewski's London-based weekly, Wiadomości (political and literary newspaper), where, together with his new life partner, art historian Stefania Zahorska, they edited the Puszka (Pandora's Box) section given over to commentary on world affairs. His published work was centred on international affairs, in particular east–west relations, and developments in Poland. He was a political sparring partner to Juliusz Mieroszewski, who was a columnist for the Paris-based Kultura.

Pragier was unwavering in his support of the legal continuity of the Polish government-in-exile, attributing to it an inalienable right for the continued struggle for the recovery of Poland's independence as a state. A 2019 Polish evaluation of his life dubbed him "the eternal dissident".

He was a founding member of the Polish Society of Arts and Sciences Abroad. He belonged to the Feemasons' Lodge Kopernik. In his late eighties, Pragier retired to the Polish hospital in Penley, near Wrexham, where he died in 1976. He was buried in Hampstead Cemetery, London.

== Awards ==
- Wielką Wstęgą Orderu Odrodzenia Polski (1965)
- Medal Niepodległości

== Personal life ==
In 1912 he married Eugenia Berke a PPS activist and after 1945 a member of the PZPR. After the outbreak of WwII the couple were in separation. They had no children.

== Selected works ==
- Polish Peace Aims. London: Max Love Publishing Co. Ltd. 1944.
- Cele wojenne Polski [Polish peace aims]. pub. Nakład oddziału Kultury i Prasy. Biblioteka Orła Białego. Włochy. 1945. (in Polish)
- La question polonaise. Interview accordée à M. Wincenty Maliniak, correspondant des journaux polonais aux États Unis. [The Polish question. An interview with Wincenty Maliniak, correspondent of the Polish press in the USA] 1946. (in French)
- Pragier, Adam (2018) [First published by B. Świderski in London 1966]. Friszke, Andrzej; Pejaś, Ewa (eds.). Czas przeszły dokonany - Czasy i ludzie [The Past Perfect - Lives and Times]. volume 7 of 100-lecie Niepodległości - 100th anniversary of Polish independence (in Polish). Warsaw: Museum of Polish History. ISBN 978-8-3652-4829-9.
- Puszka Pandory, (Pandora's Box) London 1969, pub. Polska Fundacja Kulturalna (in Polish)
- Czas teraźniejszy, (The Present) London 1975, pub. Polska Fundacja Kulturalna (in Polish)
- Zarys skarbowości komunalnej. 2 vols. [An outline of communal finances], original edition in 1924. Warsaw: Wydawnictwo Przemiany. 1990. (in Polish)

== Bibliography ==
- Leksykon historii Polski z 1995
- Grzegorz Szturo, Kraj i emigracja w publicystyce Adama Pragiera: lata 1945–1956
- Emigracja polska wobec problemów przebudowy i sowietyzacji kraju po drugiej wojnie światowej: studia / pod redakcją Ryszarda Sudzińskiego. Toruń, 2007.
- Profile on the Sejm Library site
