= Józef Chaciński =

Polish lawyer and politician

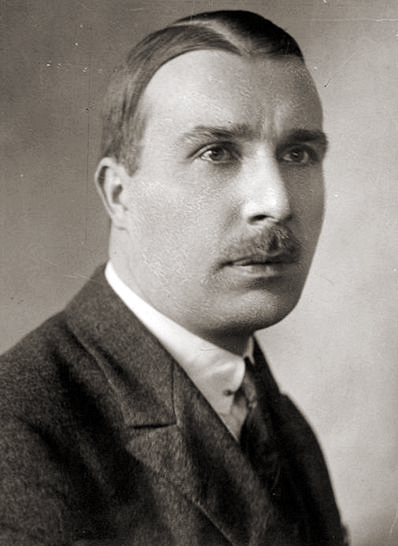
Józef Chaciński

Józef Chaciński (Polish pronunciation: [ˈjuzɛf xaˈt͡ɕij̃skʲi]; 13 March 1889 – 6 May 1954) was a Polish lawyer and politician.

Chaciński was member of the Sejm from 1922 until 1930. During the Second World War, he was imprisoned in the German concentration camp Auschwitz from 1940 until 1942. In 1945 he was arrested by the NKVD.

== See also ==
- Trial of the Sixteen
