= Maksymilian Malinowski =

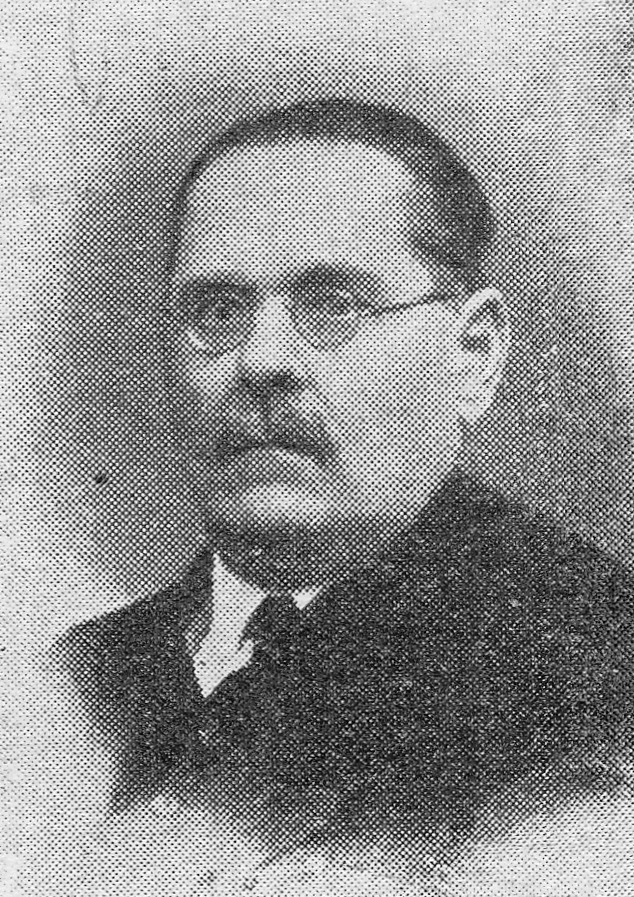

Maksymilian Malinowski, actually Maksymilian Miłguj (born 23 June 1860 in Ciechocin, died 18 March 1948 in Warsaw) was a Polish activist of the peasant movement in Poland, propagator of cooperatives, teacher and publicist in the Second Polish Republic, a poseł and senator. His son, Edmund Malinowski, was a known botanist.

== Biography ==
Maksymilian Malinowski graduated a teacher's seminarium in Wymyślin in 1879. He worked as a teacher in 1880 in Kamienica, and between 1881 and 1886 in Dobrzyń nad Wisłą. Next he settled in Warsaw and became a publicist. From 1887 to 1906 he was an editor and publisher of „Zorza”. Between 1900 and 1906 he was an activist for the National League. In 1906 he allied with the Progressive-Democratic Union and joined the Young People's Poland Union.

From 1918 he participated in the Polish People's Party „Wyzwolenie”, in 1925 he became its chairman. Between 1922 and 1935 he was a poseł for the Sejm, and between 1935 and 1938 a senator. Between 1931 and 1935 he was a leading member of the People's Party, which he left in 1935 to support the Sanation regime.

In 1938 he was awarded the Cross of Independence.

== Private life ==
He was the son of Stanisław and Maria Miłguj. He had a wife, Teodora, and children: Edmund, Wiesław, Tadeusz i Sabina.

== Bibliography ==
- Sejm Library profile
