= Agrarian Union (Poland) =

Agrarian Union Związek Chłopski
- Founded: 1924
- Dissolved: 1926
- Split from: Polish People's Party "Piast"; Polish People's Party "Left"
- Merged into: Peasant Party
- Ideology: Agrarianism

The Agrarian Union (Polish: Związek Chłopski, ZCh) was a political party in Poland.

== History ==
The party was established on 11 May 1924 by a merger of the Polish People's Party "Left" and a breakaway faction of the Polish People's Party "Piast". In January 1926 it merged into Stronnictwo Chłopskie.

The party was reformed in 1928 by Jan Stapiński. In the elections that year, the party received 1.2% of the vote, winning three seats in the Sejm. In 1931 it became a faction within the Nonpartisan Bloc for Cooperation with the Government and ceased to exist as an independent party.
