= Polish People's Party "Wyzwolenie" =

Polish People's Party "Wyzwolenie" Polskie Stronnictwo Ludowe "Wyzwolenie"
- Abbreviation: PSL Wyzwolenie
- President: Tomasz Nocznicki (1915–1918); Błażej Stolarski (1918–1921); Stanisław Thugutt (1921–1923); Jan Dąbski (1923–1925); Maksymilian Malinowski (1925–1931)
- Founded: December 6, 1915
- Dissolved: March 15, 1931
- Merger of: Związek Chłopski; Stronnictwem Ludowym; Związkiem Ludu Polskiego
- Merged into: People's Party
- Headquarters: Warsaw, Poland
- Newspaper: Polska Ludowa
- Ideology: Agrarianism; Agrarian socialism Secularism
- Political position: Centre-left
- National affiliation: Centrolew
- International affiliation: Radical International

Polish Peasant Party "Wyzwolenie" or Polish People's Party "Wyzwolenie" (Polish: Polskie Stronnictwo Ludowe "Wyzwolenie", abbreviated as PSL Wyzwolenie) — Wyzwolenie is Polish for Liberation, and many sources translate the party's name fully as Polish Peasant Party "Liberation" or Polish People's Party "Liberation" — was a political party from the interwar period of the Second Polish Republic (1915–1931).

It was formed in 1915 by several peasant parties in Kingdom of Poland. In comparison to Polish People's Party "Piast", it was a left-wing party, and an ally of Polish Socialist Party (Polska Partia Socjalistyczna). PSL Wyzwolenie supported the May Coup in 1926, but soon afterwards distanced itself from Sanation and joined the opposition. In 1931, it merged with several other parties, including Polish People's Party "Piast", forming the People's Party (Stronnictwo Ludowe).

== Politicians ==
Important politicians included:

- Gabriel Narutowicz
- Stanisław Thugutt
- Tomasz Nocznicki
- Maksymilian Malinowski

== Election results ==
=== Sejm ===
Year	Popular vote	% of vote	Seats	Seat change
1919	839,914	15.05 (#2)	59 / 394	n/a
1922	963,385	10.99 (#4)	49 / 444	▼10
1928	834,710	7.27 (#5)	40 / 444	▼9
1930	1,965,864	17.3 (#2)	15 / 444	▼25
1930	As part of the Centrolew coalition, which won 79 seats in total.			

=== Senate ===
Year	Popular vote	% of vote	Seats	Seat change
1922	529,675	9.43 (#4)	8 / 111	n/a
1928	391,918	6.13 (#6)	7 / 111	▼1
1930	As part of the Centrolew coalition, which won 13 seats in total.			
