= Peasant Party (Poland) =

Peasant Party Stronnictwo Chłopskie
- Abbreviation: SCh
- Founded: 1926
- Dissolved: 1931
- Split from: Radical Peasant Party; Polish People's Party "Wyzwolenie"; Agrarian Union
- Merged into: People's Party
- Headquarters: Warsaw, Poland
- Ideology: Agrarianism; Agrarian socialism Left-wing populism Anti-clericalism
- Political position: Left-wing
- Religion: Secularism

Party flag

The Peasant Party (Polish: Stronnictwo Chłopskie, Polish pronunciation: [strɔɲˈɲit͡sfɔ ˈxwɔpskʲɛ] abbreviated as SCh) was a Polish political party, active from 1926 to 1931 in the Second Polish Republic. It was created from a faction of Polish People's Party "Wyzwolenie" (PSL Wyzwolenie) of Jan Dąbski, the Agrarian Union and People's Unity. It supported the May Coup of Józef Piłsudski in 1926, but then it moved to opposition, with some politicians splitting off in protest. In 1928, it joined the Centrolew coalition. In 1931, it merged back with PSL Wyzwolenie and Polish People's Party "Piast", forming the People's Party (SL).

== Ideology ==
The SCh was founded on several ideological beliefs shaped by the socio-economic context of early 20th-century Poland, particularly the challenges faced by the rural population. A central tenet of SL's ideology was agrarianism, which emphasized the importance of agriculture and the rural community as the backbone of the nation. The party believed that land tenure was crucial for securing the livelihoods of peasants and argued for land reform to redistribute large estates to impoverished rural families. This stance was a response to the stark economic inequalities where a small number of wealthy landowners controlled vast agricultural resources while the majority of peasants lived in poverty.

Another critical ideological pillar was the commitment to democracy. SCh saw democratic governance as essential for achieving social and economic justice. They believed that political representation for the rural majority was necessary, asserting that without it, the interests of peasants would continue to be neglected in favor of urban elites. The party's experiences of repression and marginalization under the authoritarian Sanacja regime further fueled their dedication to political freedoms and civil rights.

Additionally, the Peasant Party championed social justice, advocating for improvements in education, healthcare, and infrastructure in rural areas. They recognized that access to these essential services was vital for empowering individuals and communities, thus fostering a more equitable society.

Anti-clericalism was also an integral part of SL’s beliefs. While the Catholic Church held considerable influence in Poland, SCh often viewed its power as a potential barrier to social progress and reform. The party criticized the Church for its close ties to the political establishment and its resistance to progressive changes that could benefit the peasant class. SCh sought to reduce the Church's influence on public policy, advocating for the separation of church and state, and promoting a vision of a secular society where the interests of the peasantry were prioritized over ecclesiastical authority.

Moreover, SCh emphasized the importance of collective action and solidarity among peasants, believing that uniting the rural population would enable them to effectively challenge economic disparities and political oppression. This collective identity was crucial in fostering a sense of agency among peasants, who often felt disempowered in the broader socio-political landscape.

In summary, the SCh's ideological beliefs were rooted in a desire for agrarian reform, democratic governance, social justice, and anti-clericalism. These beliefs reflected their commitment to improving the conditions of Poland's rural population and were informed by the historical context of economic disparity, political repression, and the fundamental role of agriculture in Polish society. This multi-faceted ideology drove the party's advocacy for the rights and welfare of peasants throughout its existence.
