= Jan Dąbski =

Polish politician (1880–1931)

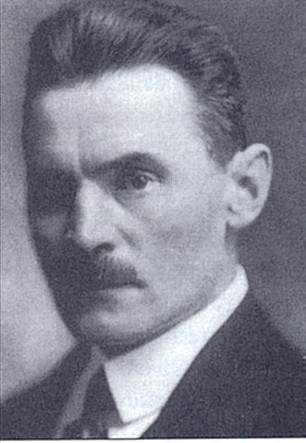
Jan Dąbski

Jan Dąbski (10 April 1880 in Kukizów, Galicia– 5 June 1931 in Warsaw, Poland) was a Polish politician. He served as Minister of Foreign Affairs of Poland in 1921.

== Career ==
He was the founder of Polish People's Party "Piast" (PSL Piast) in 1913. He was the chief negotiator for Poland at the peace negotiations for the Treaty of Riga after the Polish–Soviet War of 1920–1921. He also served as Minister of Foreign Affairs of Poland from 28 March 1921 to 11 June 1921. He was a deputy to the Polish parliament (Sejm) until 1930, and he was also an important politician in the PSL peasant party factions (PSL Piast, PSL Jedność Ludowa, Polish People's Party "Wyzwolenie", Stronnictwo Chłopskie). He also is considered the founder of the Sejm Library in 1919.
