= Malta Hospital =

Former military hospital in Warsaw, Poland

Malta Hospital (defunct)
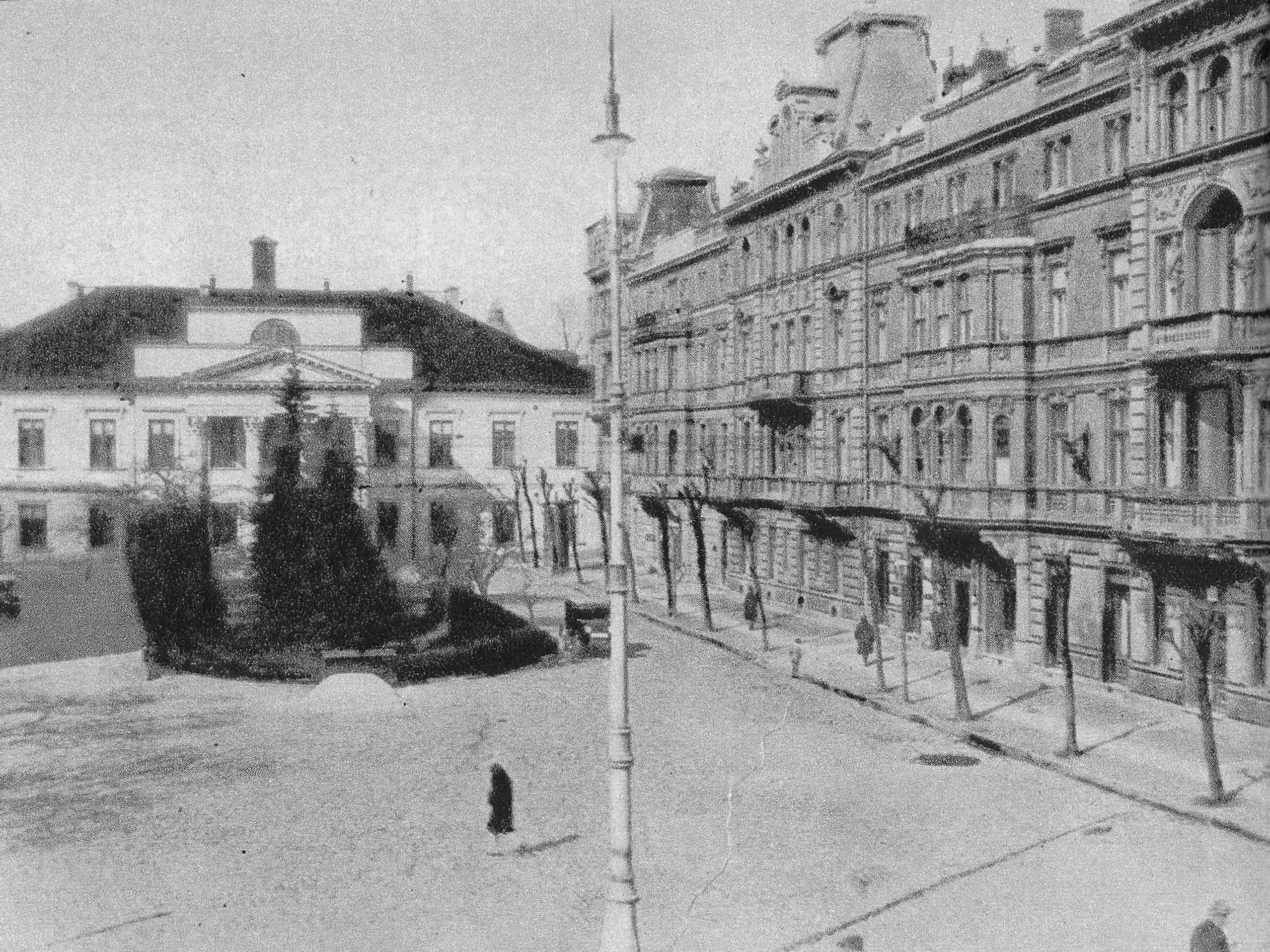
- Mniszech Palace (on the left), the hospital's headquarters

Geography
- Location: 38/40 Senatorska Street, Warsaw, Poland
- Coordinates: 52°14′37″N 21°0′13.5″E

Organisation
- Type: Military hospital of the Sovereign Military Order of Malta

Services
- Beds: ~200

History
- Opened: 7 September 1939
- Demolished: 14 September 1944

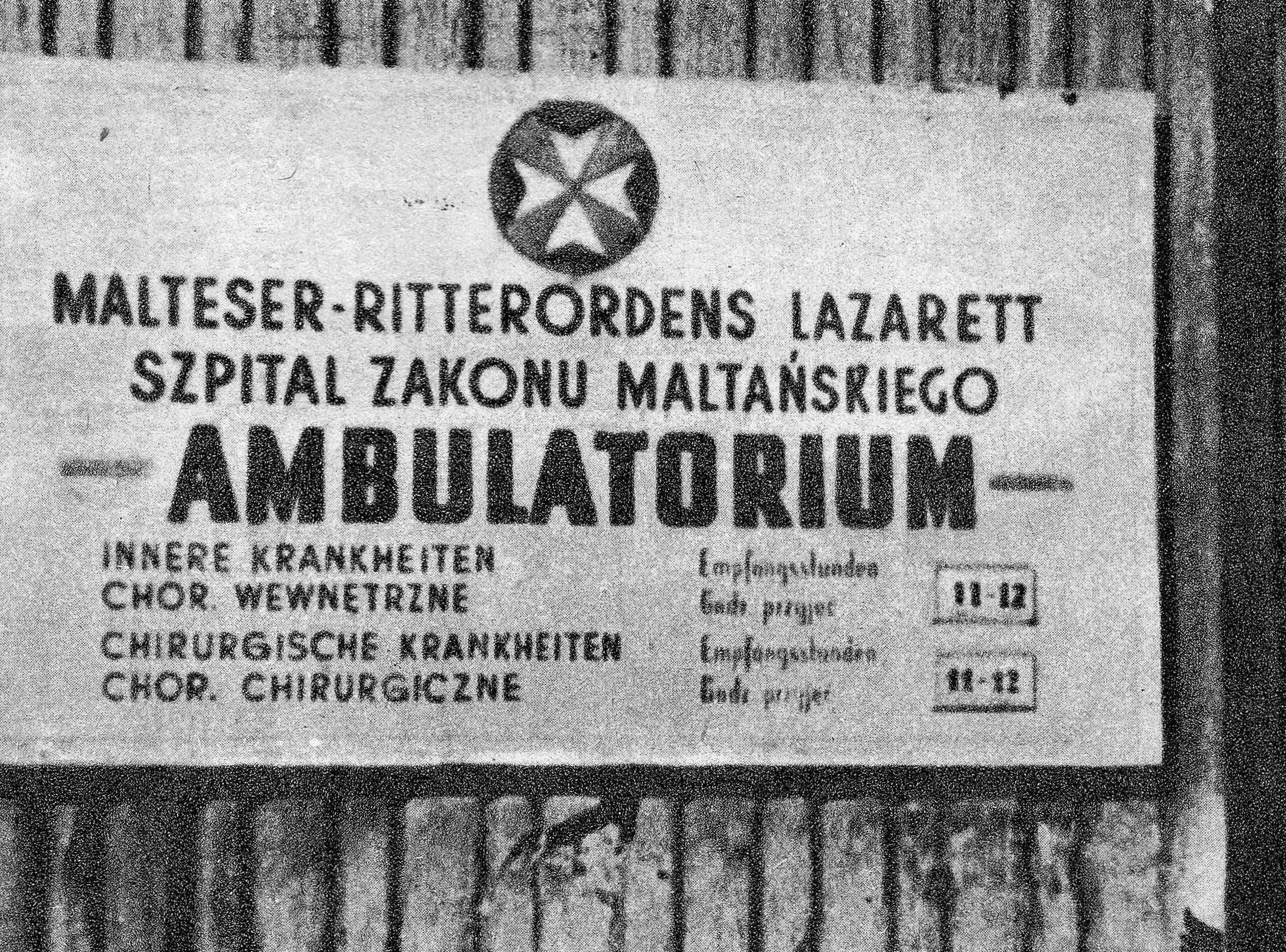
Plaque at the hospital entrance

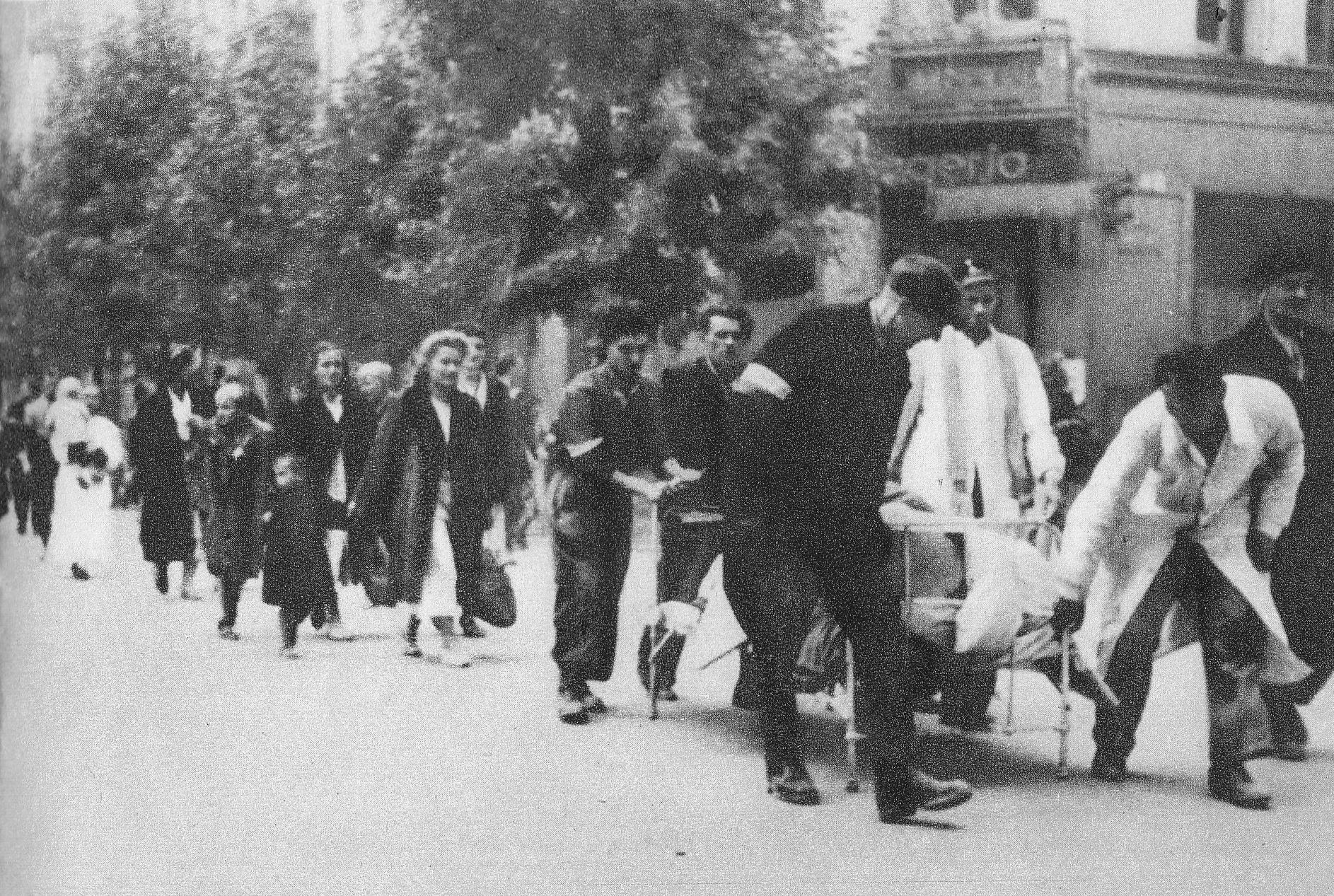
Evacuation of the hospital during the Warsaw Uprising, August 1944

The Malta Hospital was a military hospital established by the Sovereign Military Order of Malta in the Mniszech Palace in Warsaw, Poland. Opened on 7 September 1939, it operated during the 1939 defense of Warsaw, the German occupation, and the Warsaw Uprising. The hospital was evacuated and burned down by German forces on 14 September 1944.

== History ==
=== Establishment ===
The hospital was established by the Polish Sovereign Military Order of Malta during the defense of Warsaw amid the bombardments of the city, including its hospitals. Agreements with the International Red Cross and the Polish Red Cross allowed the hospital to operate under the Geneva Conventions and use the Polish Red Cross logo and the flag of the Order of St. John. It functioned as a branch of the Ujazdów Hospital.

The Mniszech Palace at 40 Senatorska Street, then occupied by the Warsaw Merchants Club, was chosen as the hospital's site. Lieutenant Stanisław Milewski-Lipkowski was appointed commandant, with Roman Chłapowski as deputy and Colonel Doctor Adam Huszcza as chief physician. Magdalena Lipkowska served as head nurse.

The hospital admitted its first patients on the evening of 7 September 1939, made possible by Warsaw residents who donated beds, linens, and equipment. On 8 September, the still-organizing hospital was bombed by the Luftwaffe.

=== Operations before the uprising ===
During the defense of Warsaw, the number of patients quickly increased (to around 300 by the end of September). Up until the city's capitulation on 28 September 1939, they were mainly victims of Luftwaffe air raids. The wounded were placed in the Mniszech Palace and in neighboring buildings, including the Zamoyski Palace, which belonged to the Zamoyski family entail. After the capitulation of Warsaw, the hospital was classified as a military hospital, maintained – in accordance with the Geneva Convention – by the victorious side (civilian patients were ordered to be transferred to other hospitals). The number of beds was reduced to 190 (mainly for traumatology; the hospital had a well-equipped operating room, located in a shelter in the adjacent building of the Landau Bank). The hospital pharmacy was also located in the bank building. The position of chief physician was held (in succession) by Colonel Julian Szymański and Captain Doctor Jerzy Dreyza. The staff apartments for doctors, nurses, and hospital personnel were located in tenement houses forming the eastern frontage of the square in front of the Mniszech Palace.

The hospital staff cooperated with the Polish Underground State. They admitted wounded participants of the Union of Armed Struggle-Home Army operations, including those involved in the assassination attempt on Kutschera. They provided assistance to Jews and others threatened with arrest, and conducted medical courses for the needs of emerging clandestine military units. An important and difficult task for the hospital staff was also securing supplies of medicines and food.

Malta Hospital was also prepared to provide medical services during the Warsaw Uprising. The hospital staff also referred to their facility as "Maltańczyk".

=== Operations during the uprising ===
At the outbreak of the uprising, the Old Town area had two stationary hospitals: the Malta Hospital and the Hospital of St. John of God. The head of medical services for the Północ Group was Major Cyprian Sadowski, codenamed Skiba.

Malta Hospital was located between German facilities in the Saxon Garden, the Wehrmacht command on Theatre Square, and the insurgent Old Town. After the fighting began, the hospital initially admitted mainly wounded Germans, while in the following days the number of wounded insurgents increased. The opinion of the wounded Germans about the medical care they received probably influenced the fate of the Poles after the hospital was taken over by a company from the SS-Sonderregiment Dirlewanger.

==== Hospital staff ====
- Physicians: Tadeusz Böhm, Jerzy Dreyza, Stanisław Gierałtowski, Władysław Kondratowicz, codenamed Wuk, Wacław Kuśnierczyk, Józef Lewandowski, Cyryl Jan Mockałło, codenamed Czesław, Stefan Tarnawski, codenamed Tarło, Szczepan Wacek, codenamed Podolski, Ludwik Wierzbicki, codenamed Judym, Wacław Żebrowski, codenamed Wacław
- Nurse: Irena Chacińska
- Sanitary workers: Halina Jóźwik-Zbierska, codenamed Gidia, Halina Żelaska, codenamed Zośka and Halinchen, Zofia Słowikowska, codenamed Zojda
- Patients: Wacław Auleytner, codenamed Gorayski, Jerzy Krasnowolski

==== Timeline: 1–14 August 1944 ====
- 1 August: The hospital was occupied by a dozen German soldiers, with wounded Germans admitted to the surgical ward.
- 2 August: Polish forces took control of the district.
- 5–6 August: Wounded individuals from Elektoralna Street and Wola, including the Home Army sanitary chief, Colonel Doctor Leon Strehl, codenamed Feliks, were admitted after the destruction of the Home Army's Third District units and the evacuation of the Home Army Main Command from Wola. Contact with the Old Town was maintained through a breach in the rear wall, while wounded Germans were admitted from the front, adhering to Dr. Dreyza's instructions to avoid risks.
- 7–14 August: The hospital changed hands multiple times, with exchanges of fire. Unlike other insurgent hospitals, no reprisals were enacted due to the presence of German POW patients. Polish wounded were gradually evacuated.
- 14 August: Colonel Strehl organized the transfer of about 200 wounded, unable to move on their own, through the German-controlled Saxon Garden towards the Ujazdów Hospital, and then to the PKO building on Jasna Street (which was given the codename "Moses" at that time). Dr. Dreyza took care of a group of 30 wounded who were left behind because there were no stretcher-bearers available during the first transport; he arranged their transfer to the Wola Hospital. The evacuation of the Malta Hospital without casualties, along with its full equipment for 120 patients, is considered an unprecedented event in the history of the Warsaw Uprising.

Subsequently, the hospital staff operated at 17 Zgoda Street (burned down on 4 September) and 17 Jan and Jędrzej Śniadecki Street.

=== Fate after evacuation ===
After the capitulation of the uprising, the Malta Hospital was relocated to Piastów as a civilian hospital. It operated in the buildings of the Tudor battery factory. After the war ended, the hospital was under the Polish Red Cross.

It was supported, among others, by the city president Tadeusz Jan Wolański, the garrison commander Lieutenant Colonel Kondratowicz, Father Bolesław Wróblewski, and the Main Board and Branch Board of the Polish Red Cross. Dr. Jerzy Dreyza was the head of the Internal Medicine Department. The facility was closed in 1949.

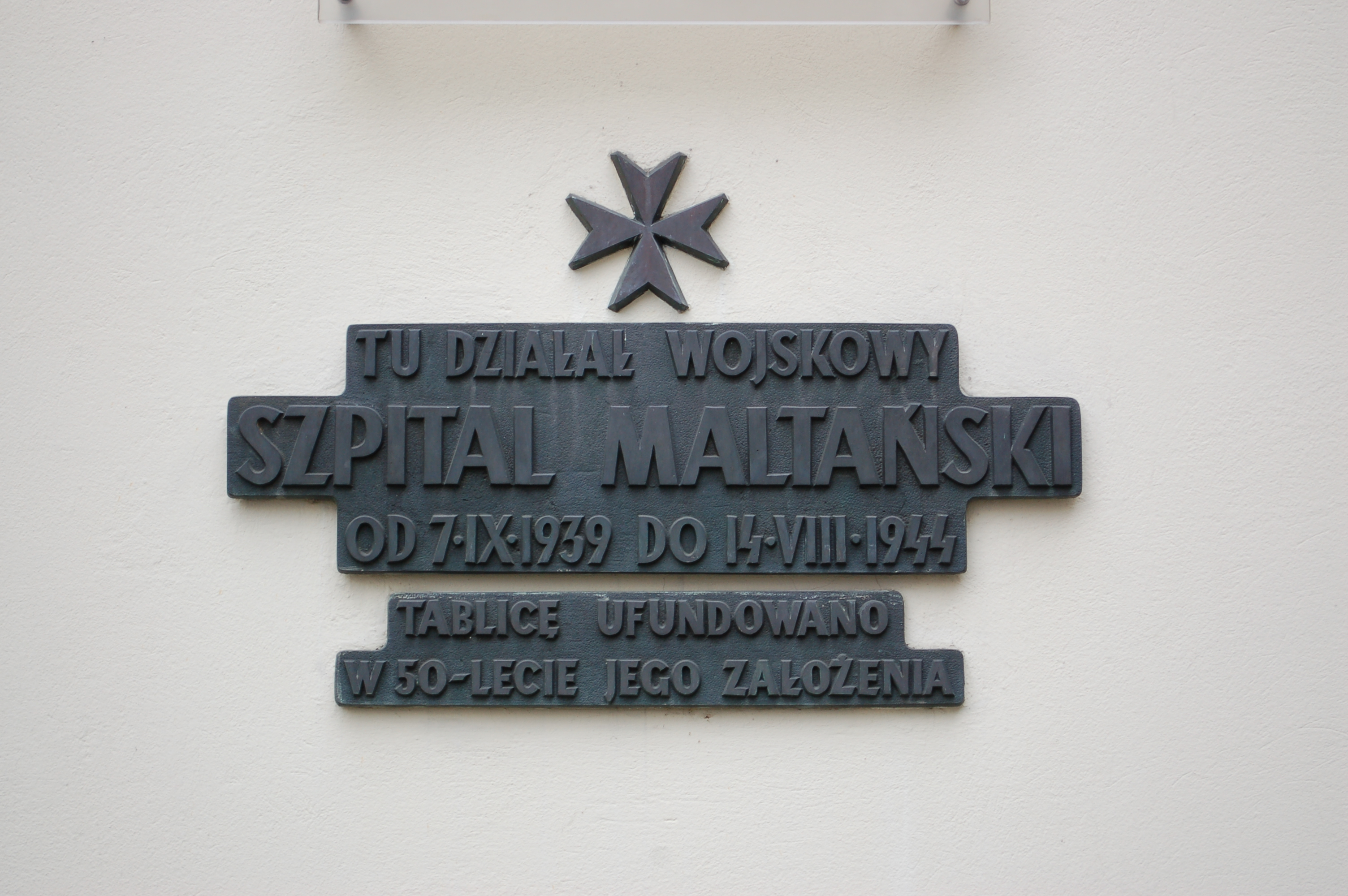
Commemorative plaque, installed on 7 September 1989 on the front wall of the Embassy of Belgium in Warsaw (34 Senatorska Street)

== Commemoration ==
On 7 September 1989, the 50th anniversary of the hospital's founding, a commemorative plaque was unveiled on the front wall of the Embassy of Belgium in Warsaw at 34 Senatorska Street. The ceremony was attended by the Belgian ambassador, Baron Thierry de Gruben, members of Prince Janusz Radziwiłł's family, and former hospital staff.
