= Julian Szymański =

Polish politician (1870–1958)

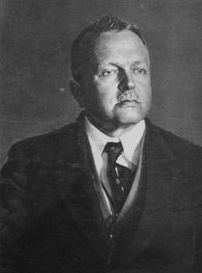
- Szymański in the years 1928-1930

Marshal of the Senate
- In office 27 March 1928 – 8 December 1930
- President: Ignacy Mościcki
- Preceded by: Wojciech Trąmpczyński
- Succeeded by: Władysław Raczkiewicz

Member of the Senate
- In office 26 March 1928 – 8 December 1930

Personal details
- Born: 10 May 1870 Kielce, Congress Kingdom of Poland Russian Empire
- Died: 8 June 1958 (aged 88) Białystok, Polish People's Republic
- Party: Independent
- Other political affiliations: Nonpartisan Bloc for Cooperation with the Government
- Awards: Commander's Cross with Star of the Order of Polonia Restituta Commander's Cross of the Order of Polonia Restituta Cross of Independence Gold Cross of Merit Order of the Cross of the Eagle 1st Class Grand Cross of the Order of the Southern Cross Knight of Magistral Grace

Julian Juliusz Szymański (10 May 1870 – 8 June 1958) was a Polish politician who served as Marshal of the Senate of Poland from 1928 to 1930 and Senator from 1928 to 1930. He was also an ophthalmologist and author.

== Biography ==
He attended university in Kyiv where he completed a major in Medical studies. After completing his medical studies in university he was an assistant in an ophthalmological clinic.

He became the physician of the Russian merchant fleet in Vladivostok in the year 1896, a position which held until 1898. He then worked as a ophthalmologist from 1899 to 1902 for the East China Railway in Charbin and served as a Military Physician in the Russo-Japanese War in 1905.

Since he took part in the Russian Revolution of 1905 he emigrated to the United States fearing repression for his participation. Szymański ran a practice in Chicago and became a secretary of the Polish Medical Association in Chicago.

In 1912 he moved to Brazil where he became a professor at the Federal University of Paraná in Curitiba. He also produced one of the first textbooks on ophthalmology in Portugeese which he also published in Polish as by the name of 'Ophthalmology in Shortened (1920)'.

Once he returned to Poland he in 1922 became a professor at the Stephan Bathory University in Vilnius.

== Political career ==
He became a Senator in 1928 in the Senate of the 2nd term of the Second Polish Republic and in the same year became the Marshal of the Senate of the Republic of Poland and continued to serve in that post until the end of the Senate's 2nd term in 1930. He did not seek re-election in the 1930 Polish parliamentary election.

== Later life ==
During the German occupation of Poland he worked in the Malta Hospital in Warsaw in which he held the position of Chief Physician. After the Second World War in 1949 he once again emigrated to Brazil with his family and participated there in the local scientific life.

After being in Brazil for 7 years he returned to Poland and had his travel expenses covered by the State Treasury in 1957 where he died a year later on 8 June 1958 in Białystok.

== Honours and awards ==
Country/Organisation	Decoration	Date
Poland	Commander's Cross with Star of Order of Polonia Restituta	1931
Poland	Commander's Cross of Order of Polonia Restituta	Exact date unknown
Poland	Cross of Independence	1931
Estonia	Order of the Cross of the Eagle 1st class	1931
Brazil	Grand Cross of the Order of the Southern Cross	1934
Poland In-Exile	Gold Cross of Merit	1940
Sovereign Military Order of Malta	Knight of Magistral Grace	1940
