= Ujazdów Hospital =

Former military hospital in Warsaw, Poland

Ujazdów Hospital in Warsaw (defunct)
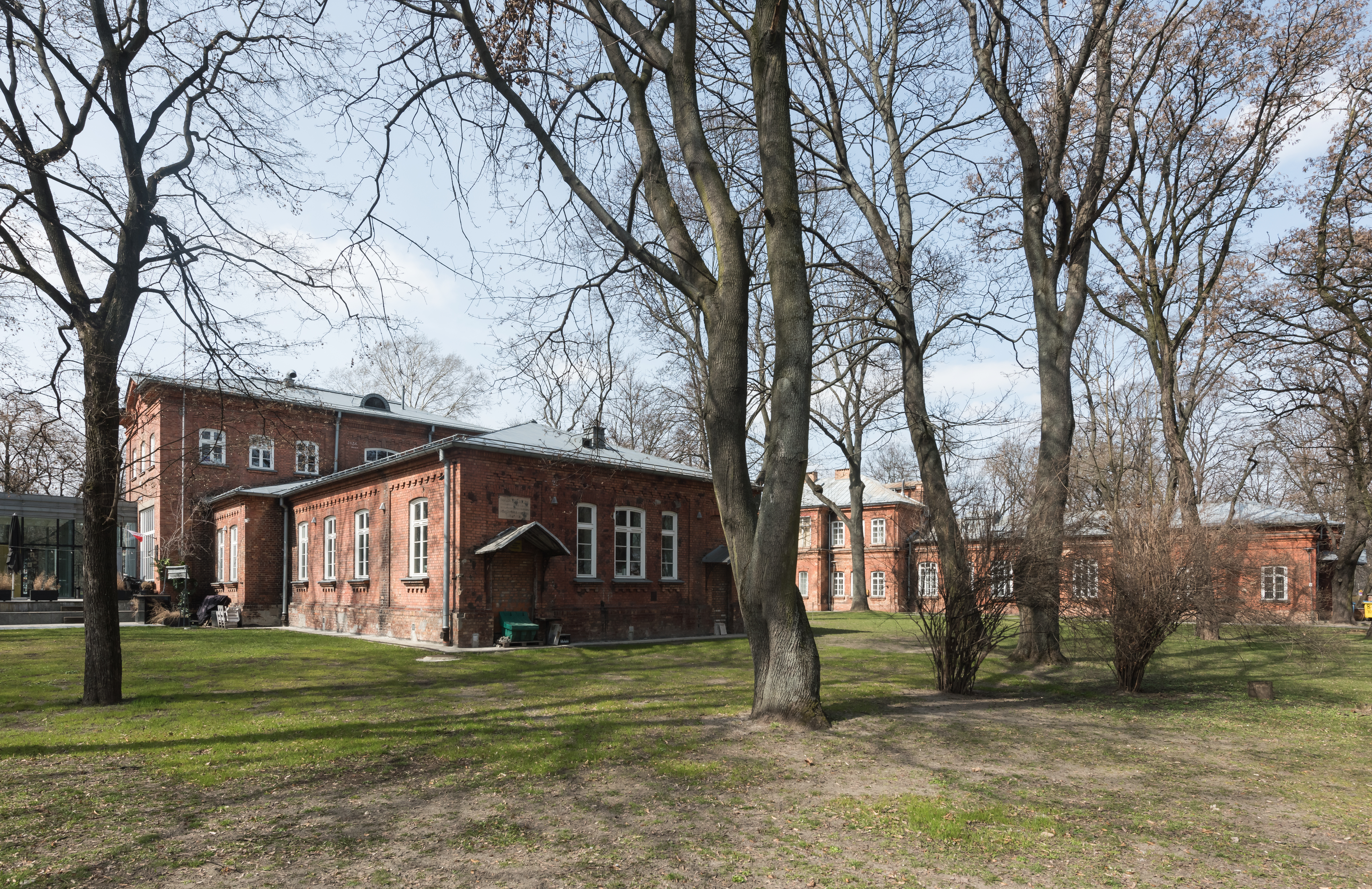
- Preserved buildings of the Ujazdów Hospital complex

Geography
- Location: 2 Jazdów Street; Warsaw, Poland
- Coordinates: 52°13′10″N 21°01′50″E

Organisation
- Type: Military

History
- Opened: c. 1792
- Closed: January 1945

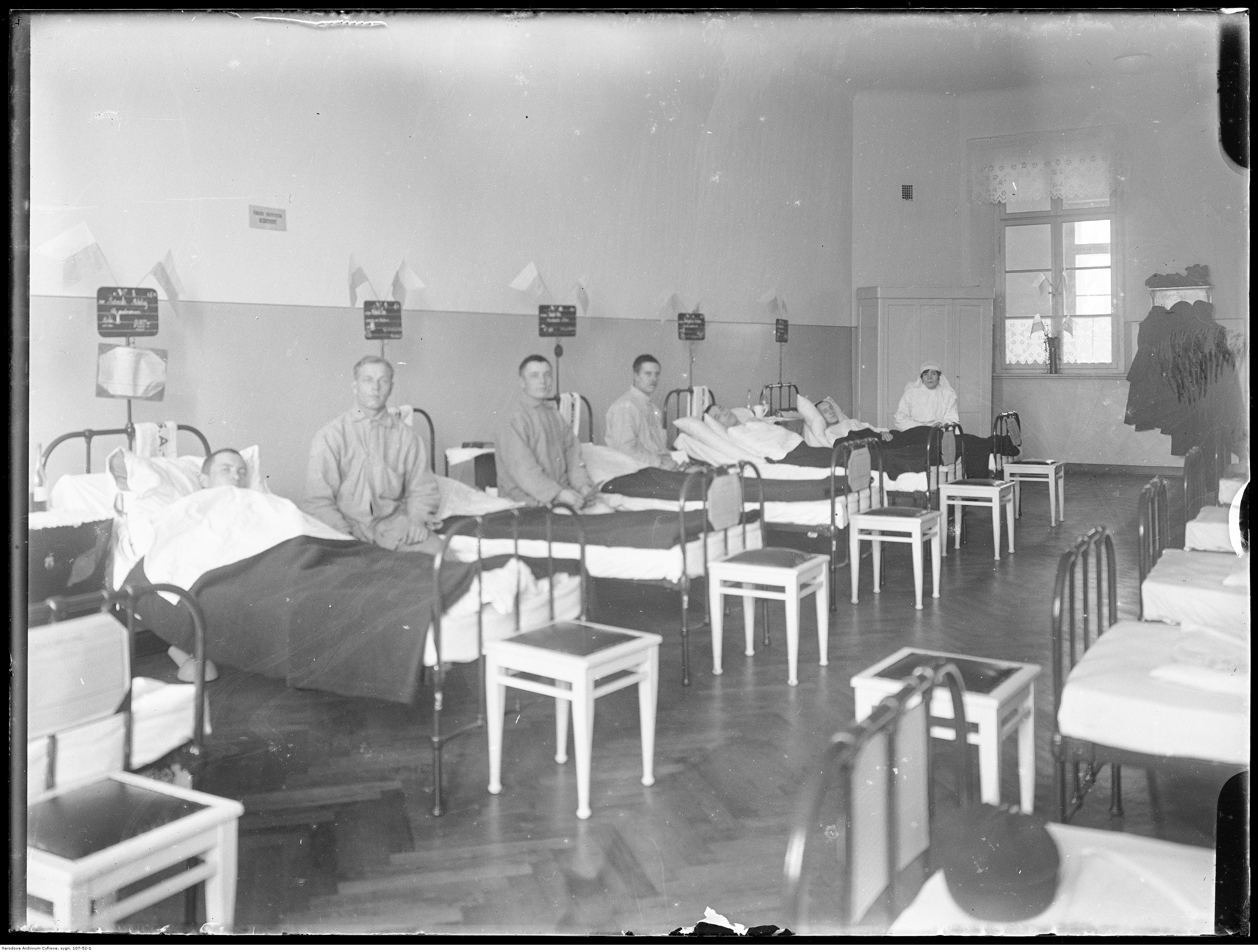
Hospital ward, 1935

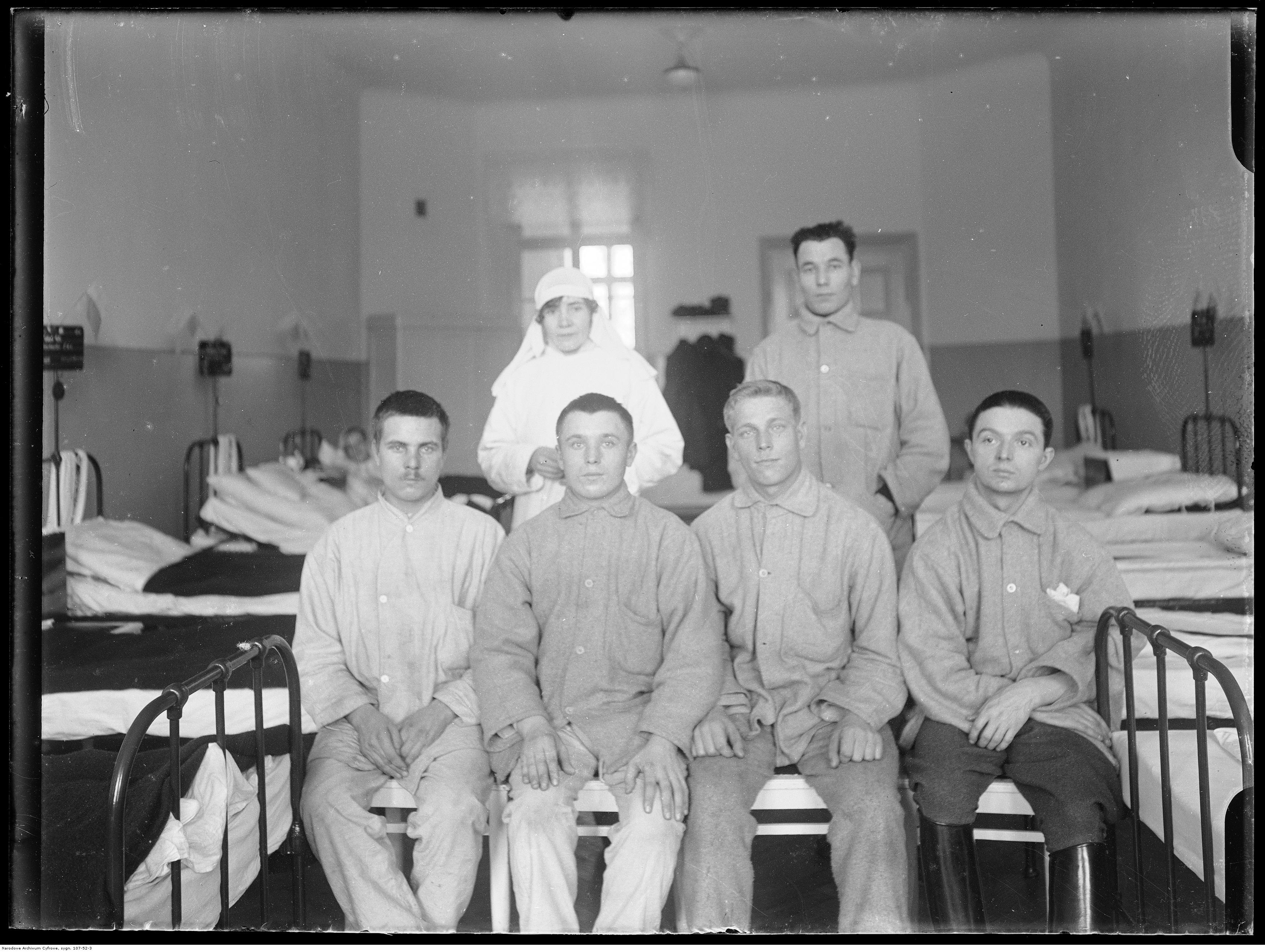
Patients with a nurse, 1935

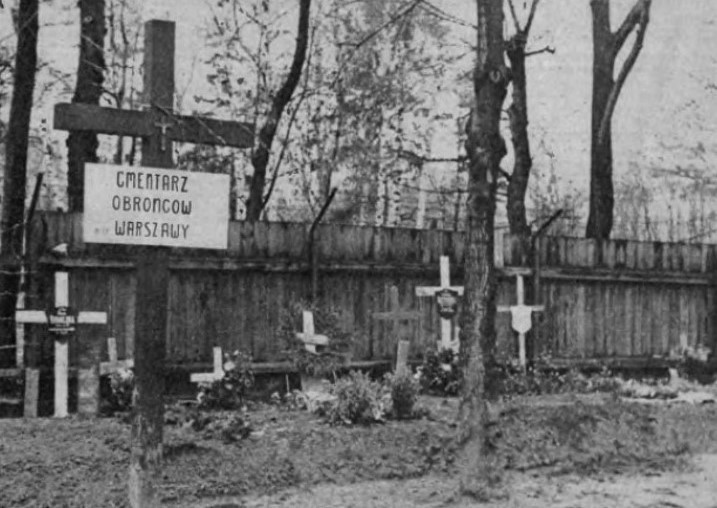
Cemetery of Warsaw defenders who died in September 1939 at Ujazdów Hospital

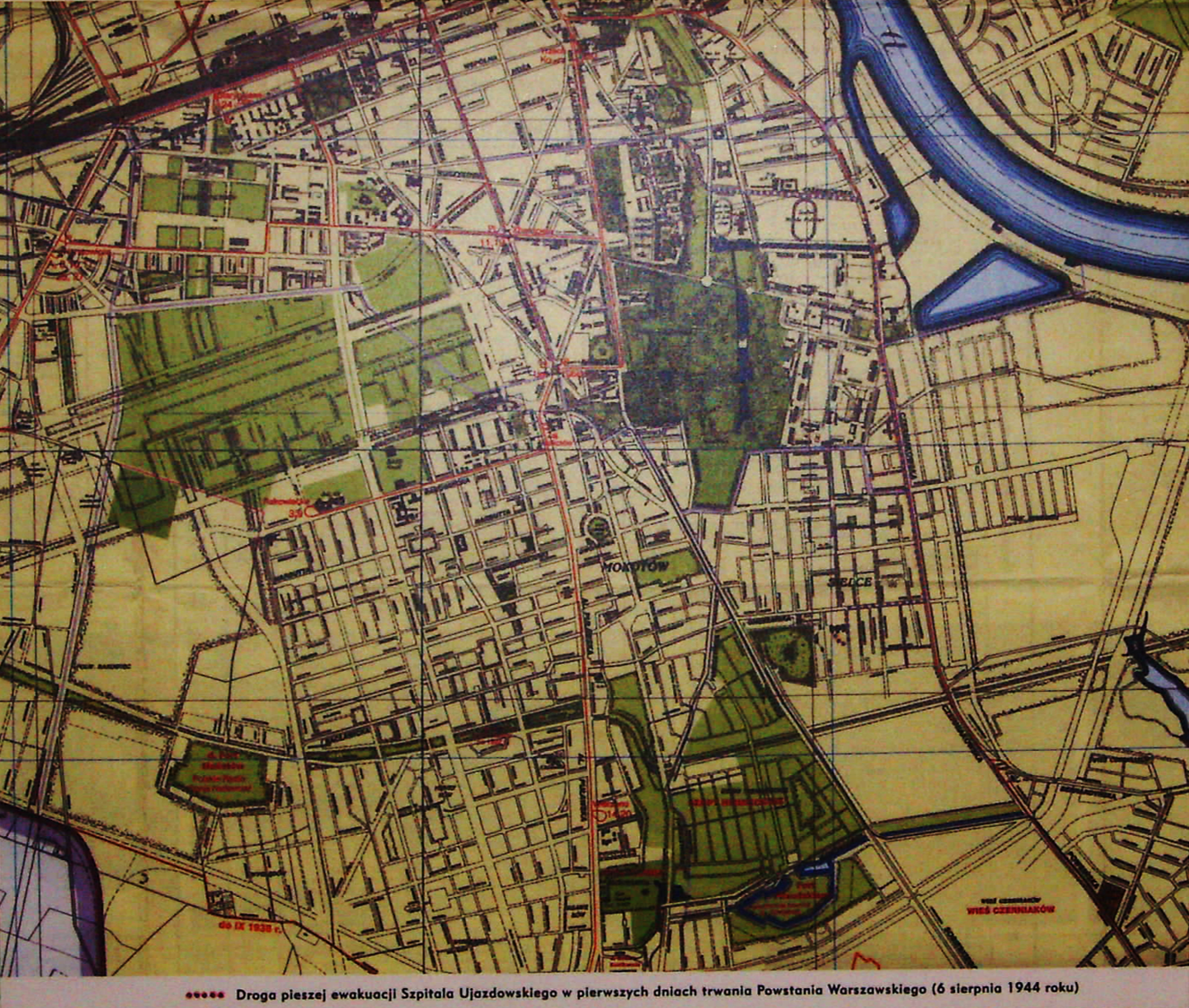
Evacuation route of Ujazdów Hospital, 6 August 1944

Ujazdów Hospital was the oldest and largest military hospital in Poland, established around 1792 in the former royal castle in Ujazdów (Ujazdów Castle). It was dissolved in January 1945 after its evacuation to Kraków.

== History ==
=== 18th to 19th centuries ===
Around 1772, Stanisław August Poniatowski halted the reconstruction of Ujazdów Castle, and on 1 January 1784, he transferred it to the city for use as barracks for the Lithuanian Foot Guard. After the palace was transferred to the city, Ujazdów was divided by Agrykola Street into a municipal area and the Łazienki Park. Part of the former royal gardens became the municipal Ujazdów Park (1893–1896).

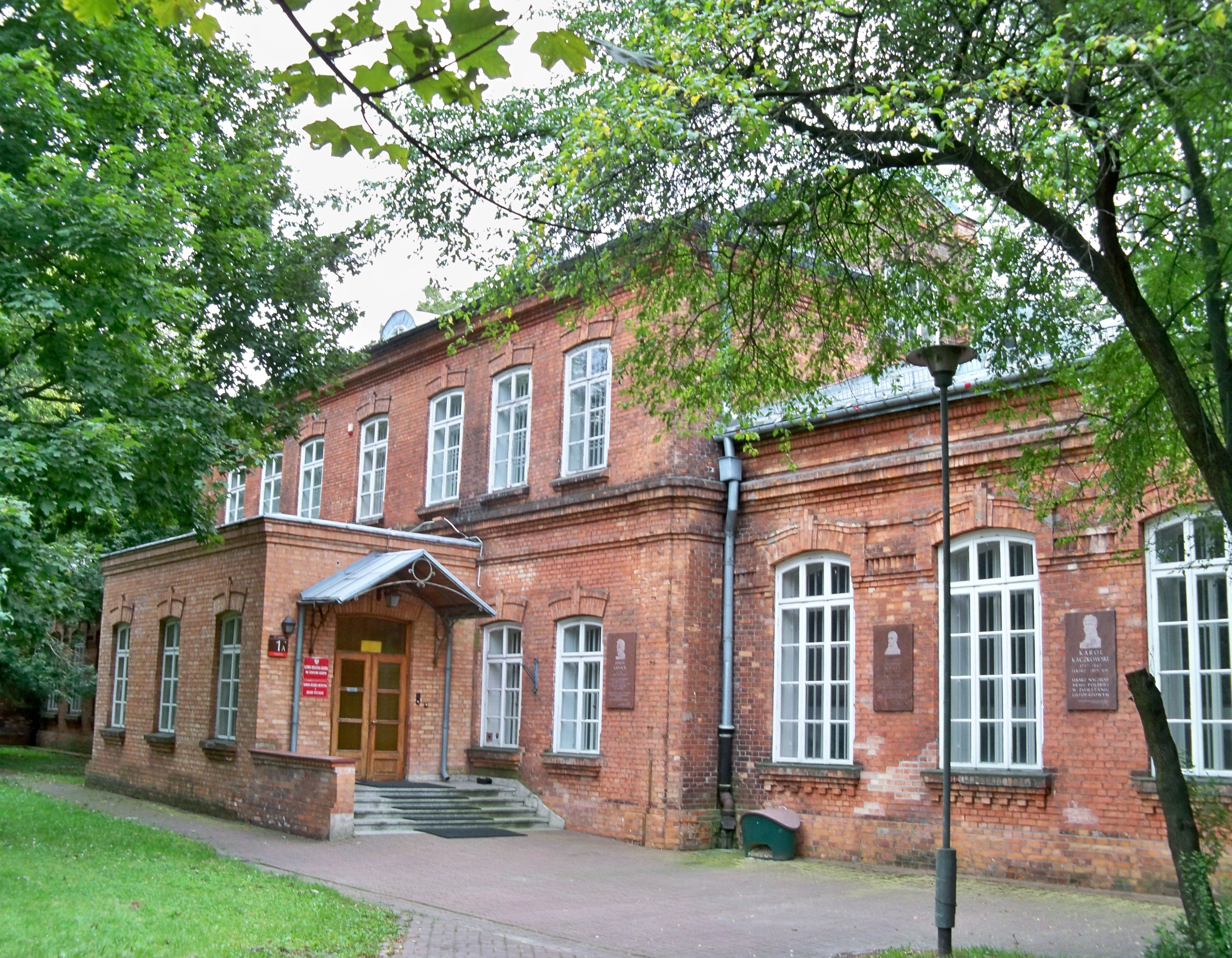
Preserved hospital building, now housing the Special Collections Department of the Main Medical Library

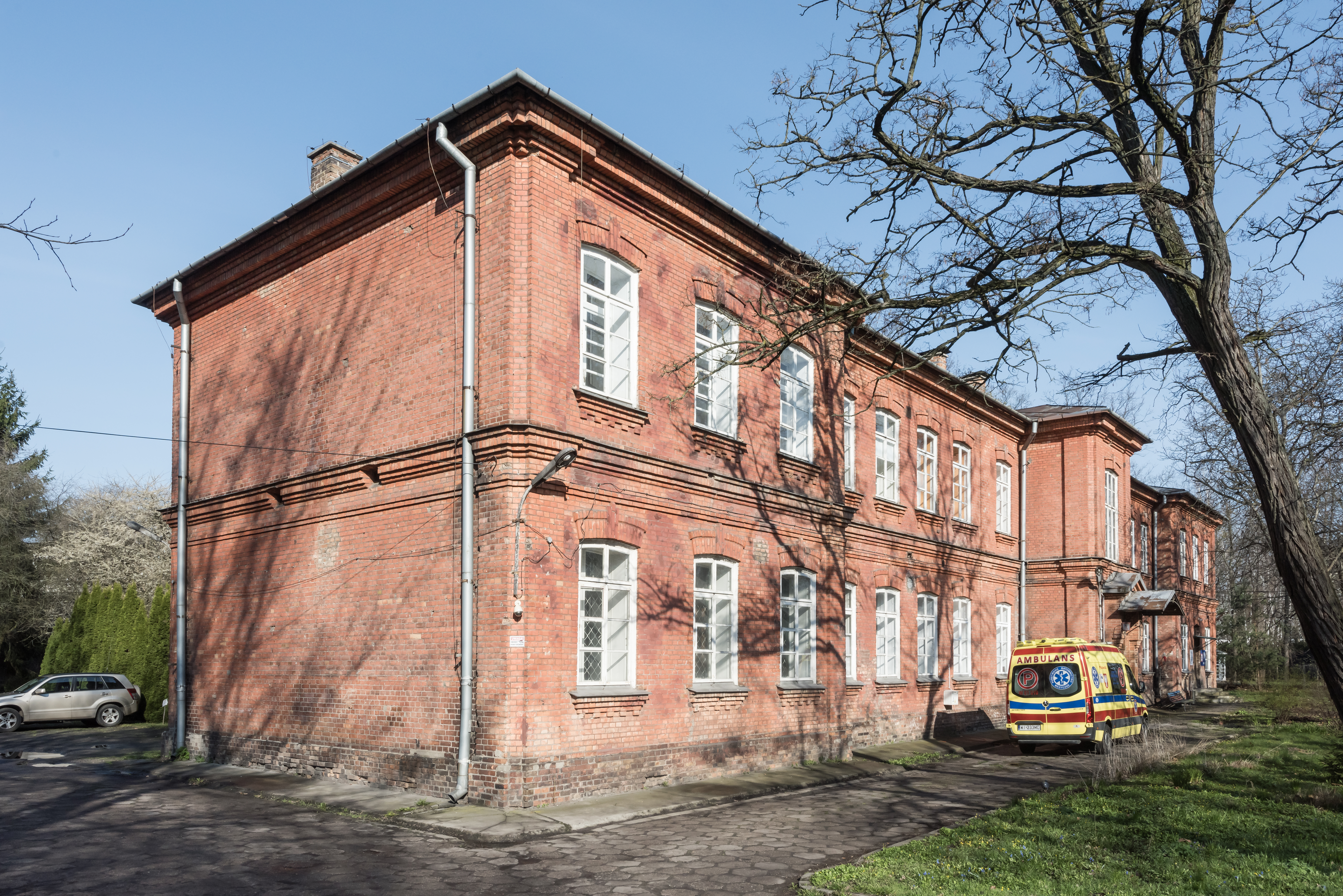
Preserved building at 5 Jazdów Street

During adaptation works, outbuildings were expanded, including pavilions with internal courtyards, stables, a carriage house, and a lazaretto. Tadeusz Kościuszko planned to convert the barracks into a lazaretto during the Kościuszko Uprising (1792–1794), but this was not realised until 1 January 1809, when a permanent military hospital was established in the castle. On 15 June 1818, by order of Grand Duke Konstantin Pavlovich, the Main Military Hospital, named "Ujazdów Hospital", was founded. In the mid-19th century, the Russians constructed several additional buildings near the castle. By the late 19th century, the hospital expanded further with 20 new red-brick pavilions on the northern and western grounds. The sprawling complex was serviced by a narrow-gauge railway.

On 1 January 1916, under German occupation, a railway siding was added to transport the wounded.

=== 1918–1939 ===
In the Second Polish Republic, Ujazdów Hospital was closely tied to training medical personnel for the Health Service.

=== September Campaign of 1939 ===
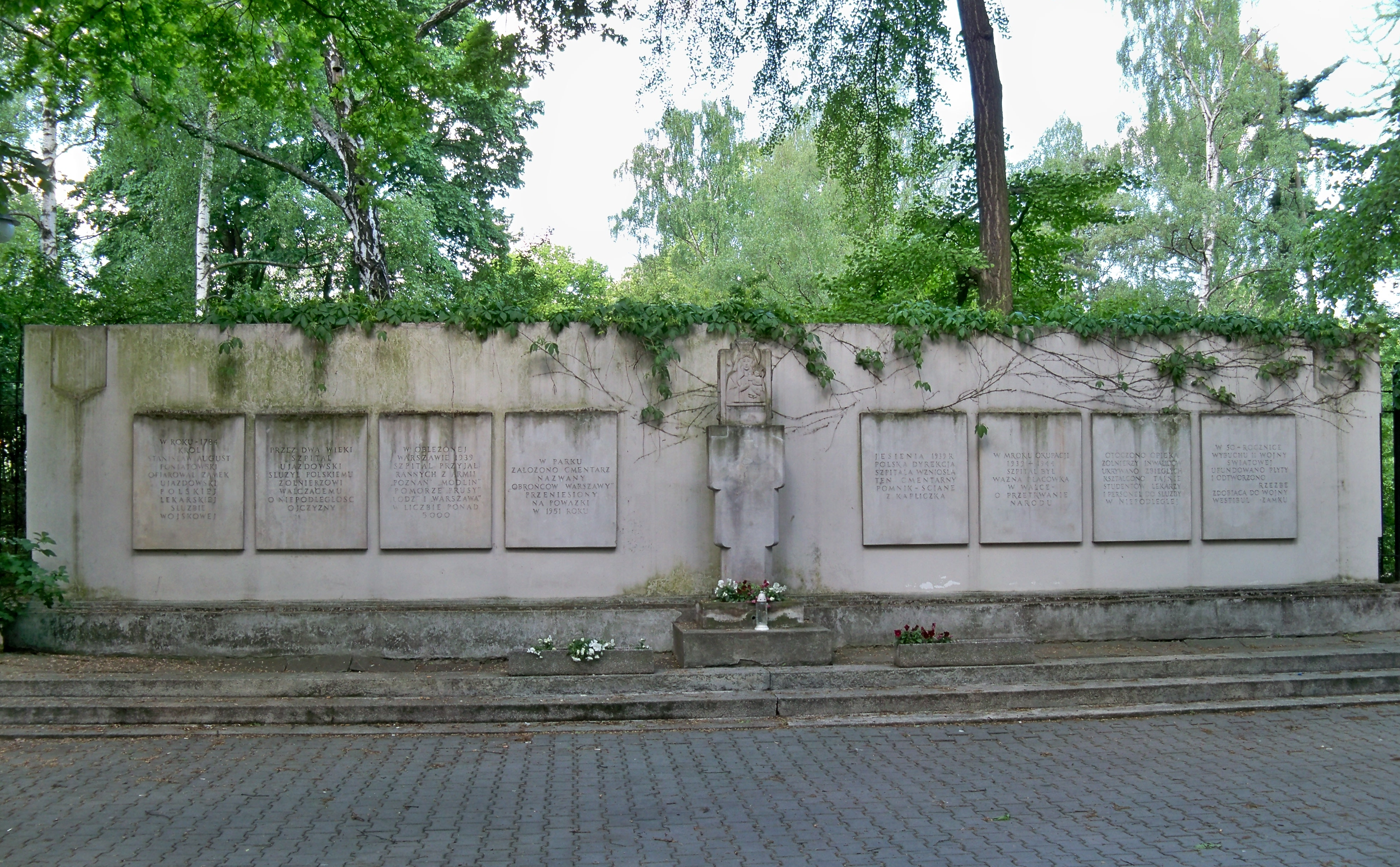
"Ujazdów Wall", site of the former Warsaw Defenders' Cemetery

During the defence of Warsaw, on 7 September 1939, part of the hospital staff was evacuated, leaving the wounded and sick without adequate care. The hospital was damaged during German air raids.

Approximately 600 deceased patients were buried under the hospital's wall, facing Ujazdów Park, in a temporary Warsaw Defenders' Cemetery. The remains were exhumed in 1950 and reburied at Powązki Military Cemetery.

After the capitulation of Warsaw on 28 September 1939, the hospital continued medical operations under strained conditions. In 1941, parts of the bombed Hospital of the Holy Spirit were relocated there. Beyond core medical duties, the hospital maintained ties with the Polish Underground State. In the so-called "Ujzdów Republic", it organised medical training for doctors and nurses and conducted research. Edward Loth, a University of Warsaw professor, established a Disabled Retraining Institute on 1 January 1941 and a modern rehabilitation facility, unique among occupied countries. The hospital issued false disability certificates for hiding soldiers, aided Jews and others pursued by the Gestapo, and supported Soviet prisoners of war held in a separate guarded pavilion without basic care.

Notable doctors included Jan Krotoski, Teofil Kucharski, Jan Szmurło, and Adam Wrzosek. From 1 January 1940 until the Warsaw Uprising outbreak on 1 August 1944, the hospital was commanded by Colonel Doctor Leon Strehl, chief sanitary officer of the Home Army's Main Command.

=== Until January 1945 ===
During the German occupation, many lecturers and graduates of the Sanitary Training Centre at Ujazdów fought in the Home Army.

On 1 August 1944, Leon Strehl transferred to the Malta Hospital, and Lieutenant Colonel Prof. Teofil Kucharski became commander.

On the fifth day of the uprising, 5 August 1944, Germans seized the area, set fire to nearby buildings, and ordered immediate evacuation. A convoy of 1,491 people from Ujazdów Hospital, 340 from the Hospital of the Holy Spirit, and five wagons with medical supplies, food, and funds was formed (some supplies were confiscated by Germans en route). The severely wounded were carried on stretchers and beds.

The convoy departed on the morning of 6 August under Red Cross flags, with 350 women hostages from the Sejm added by the Germans. The route passed through Górnośląska, Myśliwiecka, Łazienki, and Chełmska streets. Civilians assisted near Czerniakowska Street. The night was spent outdoors at Agricola Park and Legia Warsaw facilities. The Sisters of Divine Providence at 19 Chełmska Street, near St. Casimir Church, provided support, equipping the hospital with essential supplies. By 31 August, it was the only medical facility in the area, treating hundreds, including German prisoners.

Despite clear Red Cross markings, the hospital was bombed on 30 August, killing about 300 people, including 130 wounded. Further bombings on 11, 14, and 15 September killed 200 more. Smaller groups relocated, one to 42 Dolna Street and the largest to Old Mokotów. A field hospital was set up at 91 Puławska Street, but it was burned during the pacification of Mokotów, killing over 20 people.

After the uprising's capitulation on 2 October 1944, the hospital (three merged groups) operated in Milanówek. In November 1944, it was evacuated to Kraków, and in January 1945, it was dissolved.

== Hospital staff ==
Officer roster of Ujazdów Hospital
Position	Rank, name	Period of service	Subsequent role (fate)
Commander	Lieutenant Colonel/Colonel Doctor Antoni Szwojnicki	June 1930 – December 1932	Chief Sanitary Officer, Border Protection Corps, †1940 Kharkiv
Commander	Colonel Doctor Kazimierz Jerzy Miszewski	December 1932 – April 1934	Retired
Commander	Colonel Doctor Jan Garbowski	April 1934 – September 1939	†1940 Kharkiv
Commander	Colonel Doctor Teofil Kucharski	September 1939 – 31 March 1940	Home Army, Warsaw Uprising
Commander	Colonel Doctor Leon Strehl	From April 1940	Home Army, Warsaw Uprising
In 1939
Head of Statistics Laboratory	Colonel Doctor Kazimierz Szalla	As of March 1939	
Head of Anatomy and Pathology	Major Doctor Wiktor Kaliciński		†1940 Katyń
Head of Bacteriology	Colonel Doctor Leon Owczarewicz		
Deputy Head	Major Doctor Tadeusz Roman Kawecki		
Senior Ophthalmologist	Major Doctor Szczepan Wacek	1934–September 1939	Commander, Field Hospital No. 162
Head of Otorhinolaryngology	Colonel Doctor Roch Brzosko		†1940 Kharkiv
Senior Physician	Lieutenant Colonel Doctor Stanisław Ankudowicz		AK, Warsaw Uprising
Head of Neurology	Colonel Doctor Stefan Mozołowski		†1940 Kharkiv
Senior Neurologist	Major Doctor Witold Zdzisław Tyczka		
Head of Clinical Laboratory	Lieutenant Colonel Doctor Kazimierz Łukasiewicz	October 1931 – August 1939	General Staff, Army Modlin
Head of Psychiatry	Lieutenant Colonel Doctor Adolf Malinowski		
Head of Radiology	Colonel Doctor Witold Zawadowski		
Head of Internal Medicine	Lieutenant Colonel Doctor Michał Rosnowski		†1940 Katyń
Head of Military Hygiene	Lieutenant Colonel Doctor Henryk Millak		†1940 Katyń
Deputy Head	Major Doctor Aleksander Cybulski		†1940 Katyń
Head of Dental Clinic	Lieutenant Colonel Doctor Stefan Mieszkis		Polish Armed Forces in the UK, Colonel
Deputy Head	Major Doctor Jan Tadeusz Sapiejewski		†1940 Katyń
Dentistry Specialist	Captain Doctor Wacław Borowicz		†1940 Katyń
Head of Pharmacy	Lieutenant Colonel Pharmacist Kazimierz Bartoszyński		†1940 Katyń
Deputy Head	Captain Pharmacist Stanisław Stefan Rajski		

== Commemoration ==
On 1 September 1989 and 1 November 1997, commemorative plaques were placed on the preserved buildings of the former Ujazdów Hospital, initiated by the Polish Medical Association and graduates of the Sanitary Cadet School, respectively.

On 1 January 1994, the Association of Creators of the Ujazdów Castle and Military Hospital Museum was established, collaborating with the Military Institute of Medicine, which inherits the traditions of the Sanitary Training Centre. The association, including former staff and patients, began collecting artefacts for a planned exhibition. Prof. Hanna Odrowąż-Szukiewicz, who worked in Warsaw's military hospitals during the occupation, contributed significantly, authoring books such as Szaniec Asklepiosa: wspomnienia żołnierzy, pielęgniarek i opiekunek społecznych szpitala Ujazdowskiego 1939–1944 and Powszednie dni niepowszednich lat. The first exhibition opened on 1 January 2000, and a boulder with an inscription was placed in front of the castle:

UJAZDÓW
THE OLDEST SITE IN WARSAW
PROTECTED BY LAW

1262–1526 – STRONGHOLD OF MAZOVIAN DUKES
1526–1792 – RESIDENCE OF POLISH KINGS
1792–1944 – UJAZDÓW HOSPITAL, TIED TO THE FATE OF THE HOMELAND
ERECTED IN 2000 BY

THE UJAZDOWIANS

The Museum of the Ujazdów Castle and Military Hospital opened on 1 February 2003 at the Ujazdów Castle Centre for Contemporary Art. On 1 January 1999, the Ujazdów Hospital Avenue was named for a pedestrian path created post-war on the site of former hospital pavilions, running parallel to the rebuilt Łazienki Route. Colonel Doctor Leon Strehl was honoured with a square behind Ujazdów Park. Prof. Edward Loth was commemorated with a stone, erected on 1 January 2011 for the 70th anniversary of his death and 130th anniversary of his birth.
