= Museum of the Ujazdów Castle and Military Hospital =

Coordinates: 52°13′10″N 21°02′15″E

Museum of the Castle and Military Hospital at Ujazdów
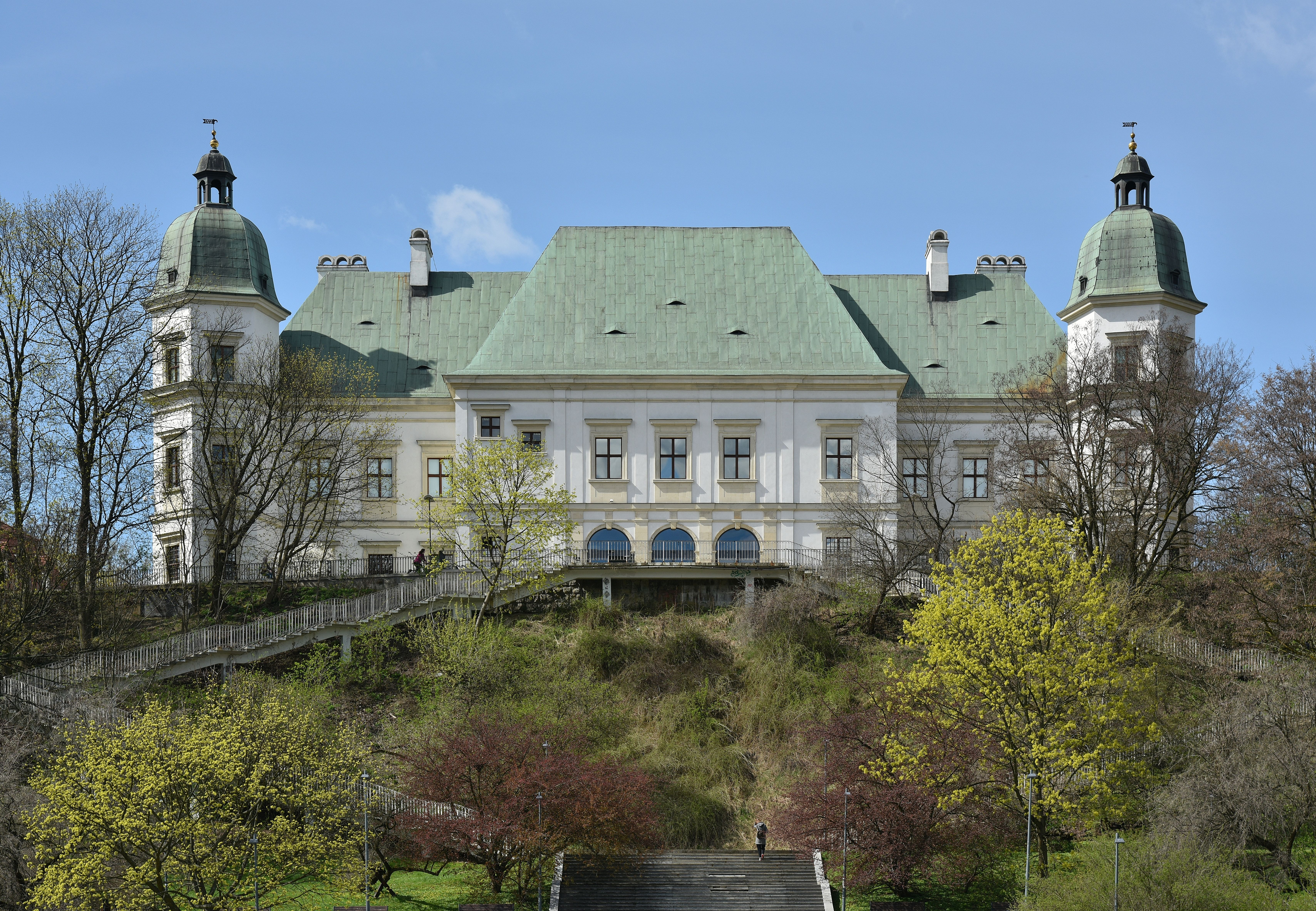
- Established: 2003
- Location: Jazdów 2 Warsaw, Poland
- Type: local museum
- Website: www.zamekujazdowski.art.pl

Muzeum Zamku i Szpitala Wojskowego na Ujazdowie is a museum in Warsaw, Poland which opened in 1994. It is located in the Ujazdów Castle, in one of the rooms belonging to the Centre for the Contemporary Art, in the north-west tower of the castle. The exhibition includes objects and photographs related to the history of the Ujazdów Castle and the Ujazdów military hospital including portraits of the castle owners and a cornerstone from 1624.
