= History of Poland =

The history of Poland spans over a thousand years, from medieval tribes, Christianization and monarchy; through Poland's Golden Age, expansionism and becoming one of the largest European powers; to its collapse and partitions, two world wars, communism, and the restoration of democracy.

The roots of Polish history can be traced to ancient times, when the territory of present-day Poland was inhabited by diverse ethnic groups, including Celts, Scythians, Sarmatians, Slavs, Balts and Germanic peoples. However, it was the West Slavic Lechites, the closest ancestors of ethnic Poles, who established permanent settlements during the Early Middle Ages. The Lechitic Western Polans, a tribe whose name denotes "people living in open fields", dominated the region and gave Poland—which lies in the North-Central European Plain—its name. The first ruling dynasty, the Piasts, emerged in the 10th century AD. Duke Mieszko I, regarded as the creator of Polish statehood, adopted Western Christianity in 966 AD. Mieszko's dominion was formally reconstituted as a medieval kingdom in 1025 by his son Bolesław I the Brave, known for his military expansions. The most successful and the last Piast monarch, Casimir III the Great, presided over a period of economic prosperity and territorial aggrandizement before his death in 1370 without male heirs.

The period of the Jagiellonian dynasty in the 14th–16th centuries brought close ties with the Lithuania, a cultural Renaissance in Poland and continued territorial expansion as well as Polonization that culminated in the establishment of the Polish–Lithuanian Commonwealth in 1569, one of Europe's great powers. The Commonwealth was able to sustain centuries-long prosperity, while its political system matured as a unique noble democracy with an elective monarchy. From the mid-17th century, however, the huge state entered a period of decline caused by devastating wars and the deterioration of its political system. Significant internal reforms were introduced in the late 18th century, such as Europe's first Constitution of 3 May 1791. The existence of the Commonwealth ended in 1795 after a series of invasions and partitions carried out by the Russian Empire, the Kingdom of Prussia and the Habsburg monarchy. From 1795 until 1918, no truly independent Polish state existed, although strong resistance movements operated. The opportunity to regain sovereignty only materialized after World War I, when the three partitioning powers were fatally weakened in the wake of war and revolution.

The Second Polish Republic was established in 1918 and existed as an independent state until 1939, when Nazi Germany and the Soviet Union invaded Poland, marking the beginning of World War II. Millions of Polish citizens of different faiths or identities perished under Nazi occupation between 1939 and 1945 through planned genocide and extermination. A Polish government-in-exile functioned throughout the war, and the Poles contributed to the Allied victory through participation in military campaigns on both the eastern and western fronts. The westward advances of the Soviet Red Army in 1944 and 1945 compelled Nazi Germany's forces to retreat from Poland, which led to the establishment of a satellite communist country, known from 1952 as the Polish People's Republic. The territorial adjustments mandated by the Allies at the end of World War II in 1945 shifted Poland's geographic centre of gravity towards the west, and the re-defined Polish lands largely lost their historic multi-ethnic character. By the late 1980s, the Polish reform movement Solidarity contributed to a peaceful transition from a planned communist economy to capitalism and a liberal parliamentary democracy. This process resulted in the creation of the modern Polish state, the Third Polish Republic, founded in 1989.

== Prehistory and protohistory ==
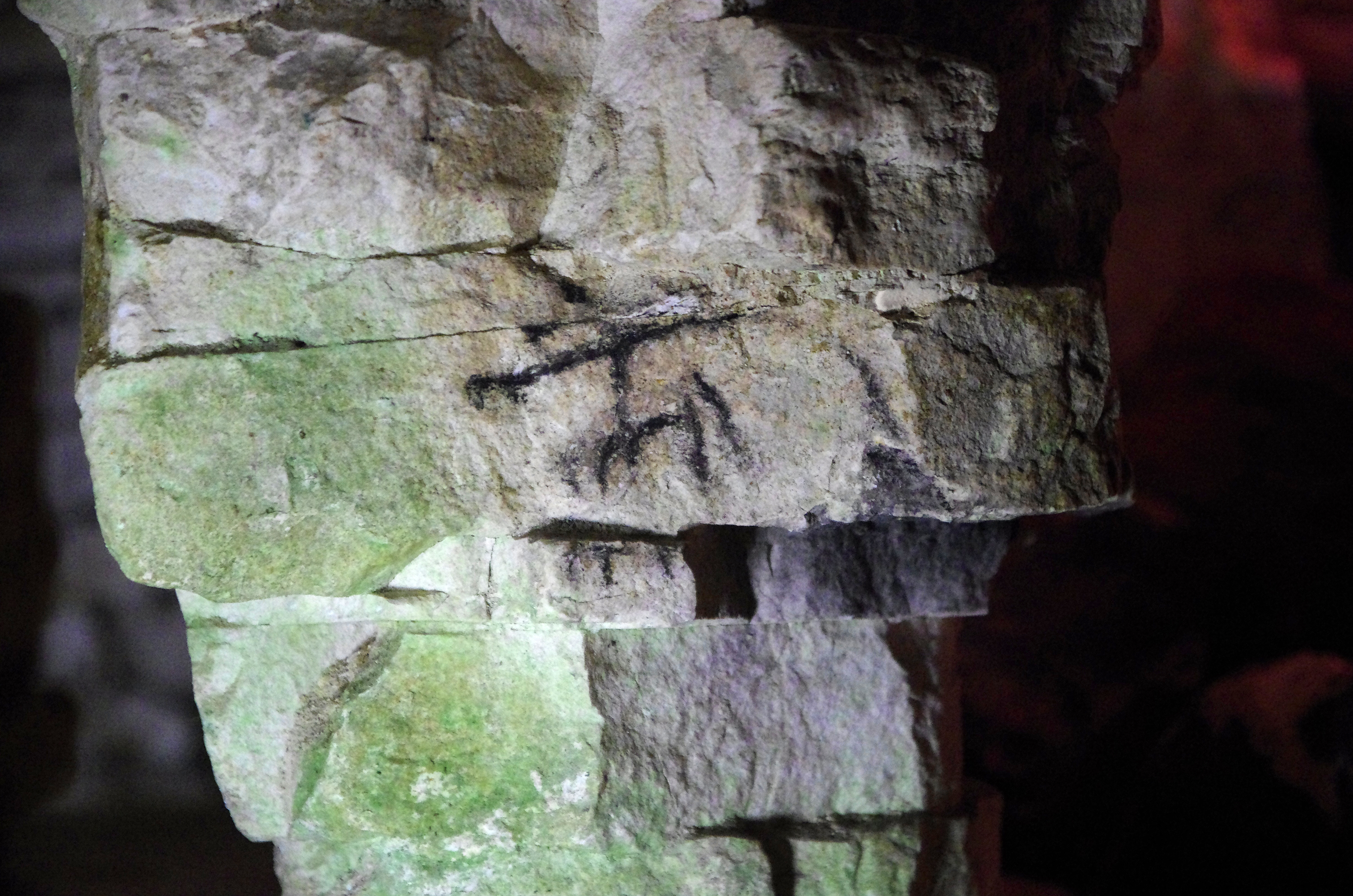
Krzemionki Flint Mine, once a source of material for Neolithic toolmaking, features an example of ancient parietal art – a linear pictogram of a female deity. It is now a UNESCO World Heritage Site.

In prehistoric and protohistoric times, over a period of approximately 500,000 years, the area of present-day Poland was intermittently inhabited by members of the genus Homo. The earliest evidence of Homo erectus activity in the form of microlith artifacts was discovered at Trzebnica, in Lower Silesia. It remains the oldest archaeological site in the country, dating back to the Lower Paleolithic period of the Stone Age. The southern regions of Poland were subsequently penetrated by sporadic groups of Neanderthals. Their presence was confirmed by the stone tools unearthed in caves of the Kraków-Częstochowa Upland, a limestone formation with hills, cliffs and valleys that came to be known as the Polish Jura.

The arrival of Homo sapiens and anatomically modern humans coincided with the climatic discontinuity at the end of the Last Glacial Period (Weichselian glaciation) around 10,000 BC, when Poland became warmer and habitable. It allowed various groups of early humans to pass the Sudeten Mountains through the Moravian Gate and the Kłodzko Valley into Lower Silesia. The Neolithic period ushered in the Linear Pottery culture, whose founders belonged to the Danubian culture and migrated from the Danube River area beginning about 5500 BC. This culture was distinguished by the establishment of the first settled agricultural communities in modern Polish territory. Later, between about 4400 and 2000 BC, the native post-Mesolithic populations would also adopt and further develop the agricultural way of life.

Excavations indicated broad-ranging development in the New Stone Age. Most notably, the oldest samples of European cheese (5500 BC) were found in the region of Kuyavia, and a pot from Bronocice is incised with what is now believed to be the earliest-known portrayal of a wheeled vehicle (3400 BC). Toolmaking became more advanced and material was primarily sourced from quarries and mines in the Świętokrzyskie (Holy Cross) Mountains. Artifacts that originated in this mountain region were excavated as far as Moravia and near the Baltic Sea. It is estimated that the UNESCO-protected neolithic flint mines at Krzemionki, one of Europe's largest, were utilised by the Funnelbeaker and Globular Amphora cultures from 3900 BC to 1600 BC. The only surviving example of ancient parietal art in Poland is at a flint shaft in Krzemionki and features a linear charcoal pictogram of a female figure or deity that has been since associated with fertility.

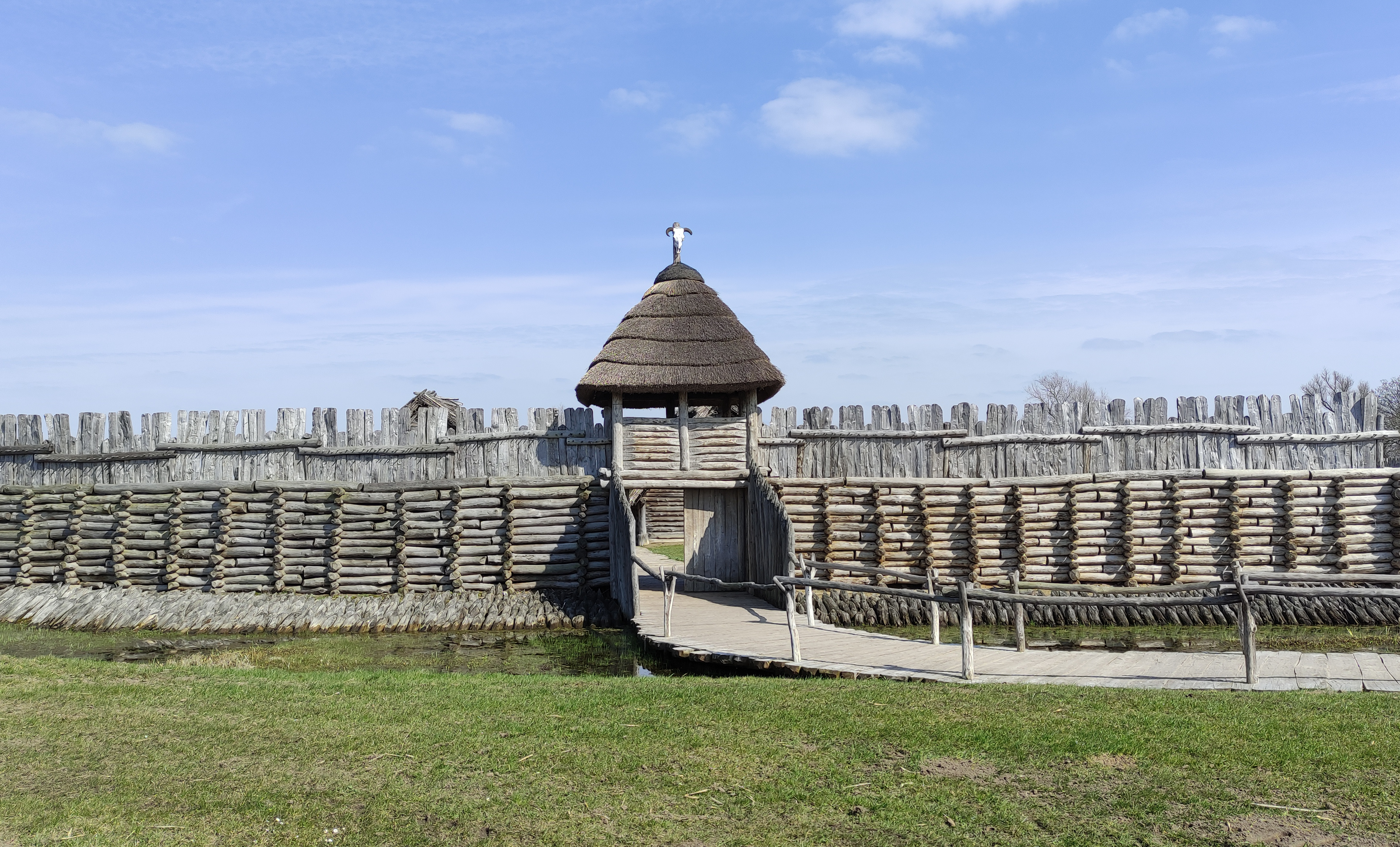
Reconstructed Biskupin fortified settlement of the Lusatian culture, 8th century BC.

Poland's Early Bronze Age began around 2400–2300 BC, whereas its Iron Age commenced c. 750–700 BC. One of the many cultures that have been uncovered, the Lusatian culture, spanned the Bronze and Iron Ages and left notable settlement sites. Around 400 BC, Poland was settled by Celts of the La Tène culture. They were soon followed by emerging cultures with a strong Germanic component, influenced first by the Celts and then by the Roman Empire. The Germanic peoples migrated out of the area by about 500 AD during the great Migration Period of the European Dark Ages. Wooded regions to the north and east were settled by Balts.

According to some archaeological research, Slavs have resided in modern Polish territories for only 1,500 years. However, recent genetic studies determined that the inhabitants of Poland are also the descendants of people from before the Migration Period. According to other archaeological and linguistic research, early Slavic peoples were likely present in parts of Poland much earlier, and may have been associated with the ancient Przeworsk culture of the 3rd century BC, though some Slavic groups may have arrived from the east in later periods. The West Slavic and Lechitic peoples as well as any remaining minority clans were organized into tribal units (Polish tribes), as outlined by the anonymous Bavarian Geographer in the 9th century. Largely divided, it was the Western Polans in the Greater Poland region who began a process of unification and created a lasting political structure in the 10th century that subsequently became the state of Poland.^{[x]}

== Piast period (10th century–1385) ==
=== Mieszko I ===
Poland expanded under its first two rulers. The dark pink area represents Poland at end of rule of Mieszko I (992), whereas the light pink area represents territories added during the reign of Bolesław I (died 1025). The dark pink area in the northwest was lost during the same period.

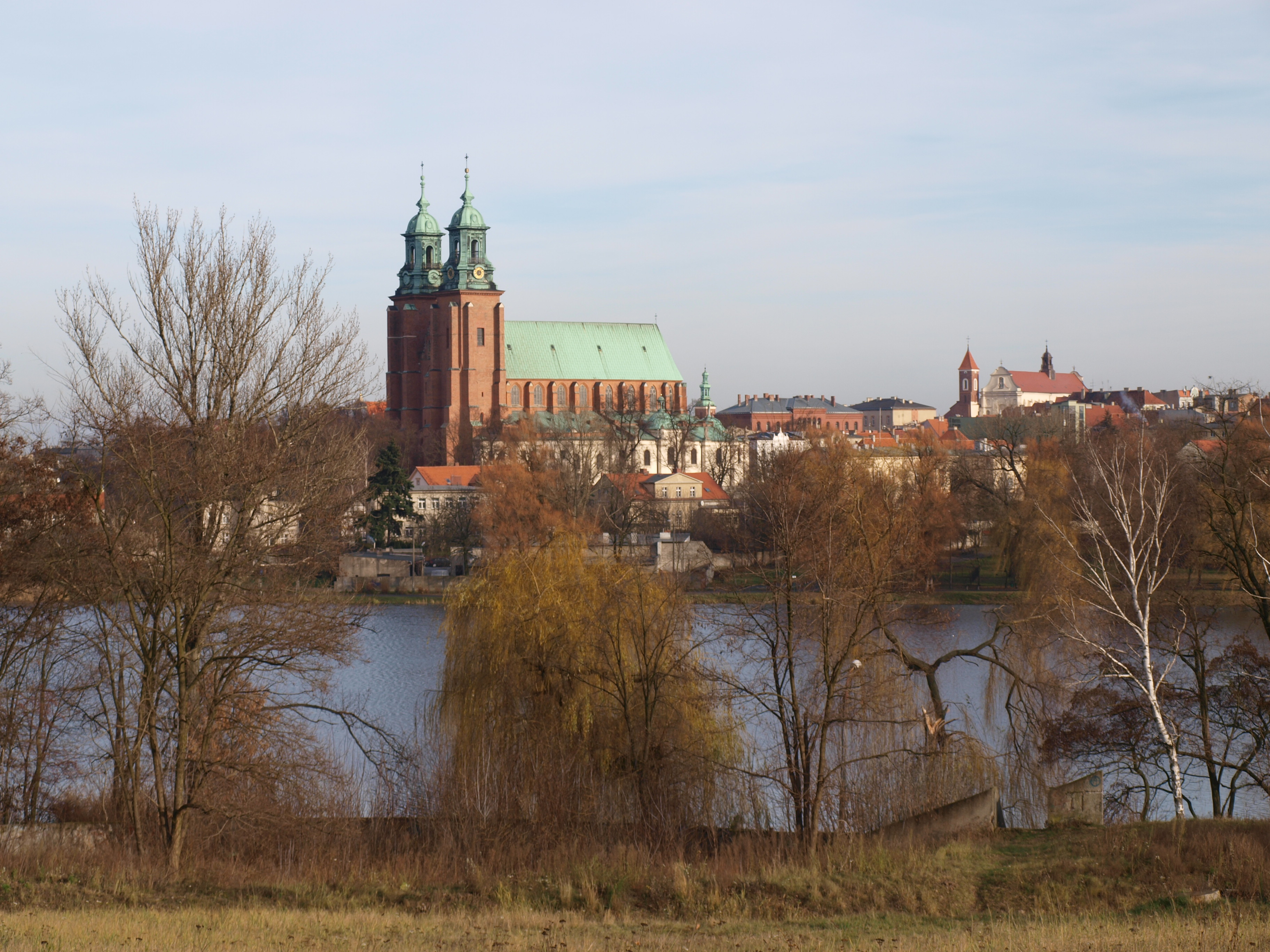
Gniezno, considered to be the first capital of Poland and seat of early Piast rulers.

Poland was established as a state under the Piast dynasty, which ruled the country between the 10th and 14th centuries. Historical records referring to the Polish state begin with the rule of Duke Mieszko I, whose reign commenced sometime before 963 and continued until his death in 992. Mieszko converted to Christianity in 966, following his marriage to Princess Doubravka of Bohemia, a fervent Christian. The event is known as the "baptism of Poland", and its date is often used to mark a symbolic beginning of Polish statehood. Mieszko completed a unification of the Lechitic tribal lands that was fundamental to the new country's existence. Following its emergence, Poland was led by a series of rulers who converted the population to Christianity, created a strong kingdom and fostered a distinctive Polish culture that was integrated into the broader European culture.

=== Bolesław I the Brave ===
Mieszko's son, Duke Bolesław I the Brave (r. 992–1025), established a Polish Church structure, pursued territorial conquests and was officially crowned the first king of Poland in 1025, near the end of his life. Bolesław also sought to spread Christianity to parts of eastern Europe that remained pagan, but suffered a setback when his greatest missionary, Adalbert of Prague, was killed in Prussia in 997. During the Congress of Gniezno in the year 1000, Holy Roman Emperor Otto III recognized the Archbishopric of Gniezno, an institution crucial for the continuing existence of the sovereign Polish state. During the reign of Otto's successor, Holy Roman Emperor Henry II, Bolesław fought prolonged wars with the Kingdom of Germany between 1002 and 1018.

=== Piast monarchy under Casimir I, Bolesław II and Bolesław III ===
Bolesław I's expansive rule overstretched the resources of the early Polish state, and it was followed by a collapse of the monarchy. Recovery took place under Casimir I the Restorer (r. 1039–1058). Casimir's son Bolesław II the Generous (r. 1058–1079) became involved in a conflict with Bishop Stanislaus of Szczepanów that ultimately caused his downfall. Bolesław had the bishop murdered in 1079 after being excommunicated by the Polish church on charges of adultery. This act sparked a revolt of Polish nobles that led to Bolesław's deposition and expulsion from the country. Around 1116, Gallus Anonymus wrote a seminal chronicle, the Gesta principum Polonorum, intended as a glorification of his patron Bolesław III Wrymouth (r. 1107–1138), a ruler who revived the tradition of military prowess of Bolesław I's time. Gallus' work remains a paramount written source for the early history of Poland.

=== Fragmentation ===
After Bolesław III divided Poland among his sons in his Testament of 1138, internal fragmentation eroded the Piast monarchical structures in the 12th and 13th centuries. In 1180, Casimir II the Just, who sought papal confirmation of his status as a senior duke, granted immunities and additional privileges to the Polish Church at the Congress of Łęczyca. Around 1220, Wincenty Kadłubek wrote his Chronica seu originale regum et principum Poloniae, another major source for early Polish history. In 1226, one of the regional Piast dukes, Konrad I of Masovia, invited the Teutonic Knights to help him fight the Baltic Prussian pagans. The Teutonic Order destroyed the Prussians but kept their lands, which resulted in centuries of warfare between Poland and the Teutonic Knights, and later between Poland and the German Prussian state. The first Mongol invasion of Poland began in 1240; it culminated in the defeat of Polish and allied Christian forces and the death of the Silesian Piast Duke Henry II the Pious at the Battle of Legnica in 1241. In 1242, Wrocław became the first Polish municipality to be incorporated, as the period of fragmentation brought economic development and growth of towns. New cities were founded and existing settlements were granted town status per Magdeburg Law. In 1264, Bolesław the Pious granted Jewish liberties in the Statute of Kalisz.

=== Late Piast monarchy under Władysław I and Casimir III ===
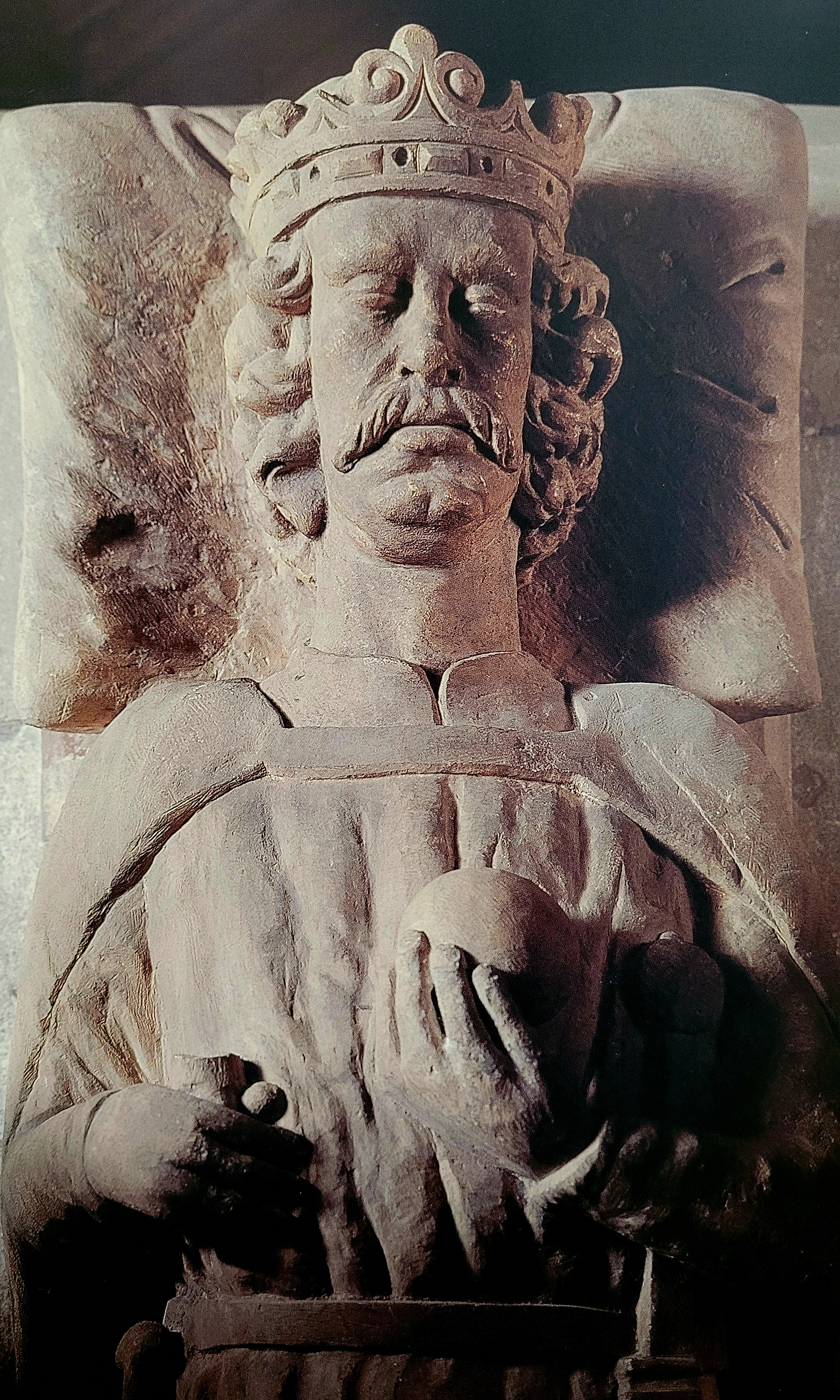
Original tomb effigy of Władysław I the Elbow-high, who was also known as Ladislaus the Short

Attempts to reunite the Polish lands gained momentum in the 13th century, and in 1295, Duke Przemysł II of Greater Poland managed to become the first ruler since Bolesław II to be crowned king of Poland. He ruled over a limited territory and was soon killed. In 1300–1305 King Wenceslaus II of Bohemia also reigned as king of Poland. The Piast Kingdom was effectively restored under Władysław I the Elbow-high (r. 1306–1333), who became king in 1320. In 1308, the Teutonic Knights seized Gdańsk and the surrounding region of Pomerelia.

King Casimir III the Great (r. 1333–1370), Władysław's son and the last of the Piast rulers, strengthened and expanded the restored Kingdom of Poland, but the western provinces of Silesia (formally ceded by Casimir in 1339) and most of Polish Pomerania were lost to the Polish state for centuries to come. Progress was made in the recovery of the separately governed central province of Mazovia, however, and in 1340, the conquest of Red Ruthenia began, marking Poland's expansion to the east. The Congress of Kraków, a vast convocation of central, eastern, and northern European rulers probably assembled to plan an anti-Turkish crusade, took place in 1364, the same year that the future Jagiellonian University, one of the oldest European universities, was founded. On 9 October 1334, Casimir III confirmed the privileges granted to Jews in 1264 by Bolesław the Pious and allowed them to settle in Poland in great numbers.

=== Angevin transition ===
After the Polish royal line and Piast junior branch died out in 1370, Poland came under the rule of Louis I of Hungary of the Capetian House of Anjou, who presided over a union of Hungary and Poland that lasted until 1382. In 1374, Louis granted the Polish nobility the Privilege of Koszyce to assure the succession of one of his daughters in Poland. His youngest daughter Jadwiga (d. 1399) assumed the Polish throne in 1384.

== Jagiellonian dynasty (1385–1572) ==
=== Dynastic union with Lithuania, Władysław II Jagiełło ===
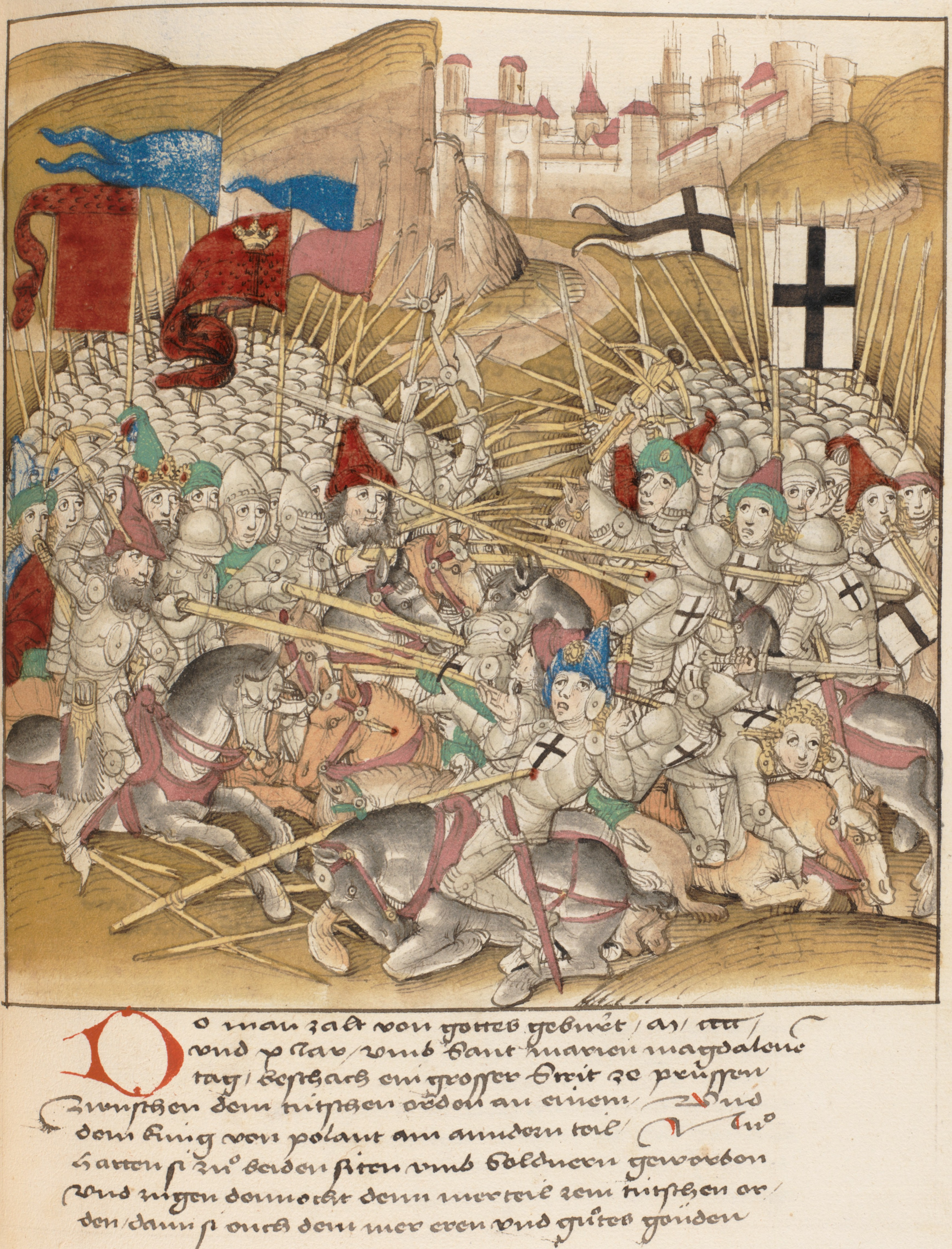
A representation of the Battle of Grunwald, a great military contest of the Late Middle Ages

In 1386, Grand Duke Jogaila of Lithuania converted to Catholicism and married Queen Jadwiga of Poland. This act enabled him to become a king of Poland himself, and he ruled as Władysław II Jagiełło until his death in 1434. The marriage established a personal Polish–Lithuanian union ruled by the Jagiellonian dynasty. The first in a series of formal "unions" was the Union of Krewo of 1385, whereby arrangements were made for the marriage of Jogaila and Jadwiga. The Polish–Lithuanian partnership brought vast areas of Ruthenia controlled by the Grand Duchy of Lithuania into Poland's sphere of influence and proved beneficial for the nationals of both countries, who coexisted and cooperated in one of the largest political entities in Europe for the next four centuries. When Queen Jadwiga died in 1399, the Kingdom of Poland fell to her husband's sole possession.

In the Baltic Sea region, Poland's struggle with the Teutonic Knights continued and culminated in the Battle of Grunwald (1410), a great victory that the Poles and Lithuanians were unable to follow up with a decisive strike against the main seat of the Teutonic Order at Malbork Castle. The Union of Horodło of 1413 further defined the evolving relationship between the Kingdom of Poland and the Grand Duchy of Lithuania.

The privileges of the szlachta (nobility) kept expanding and in 1425 the rule of Neminem captivabimus, which protected the noblemen from arbitrary royal arrests, was formulated.

=== Władysław III and Casimir IV Jagiellon ===
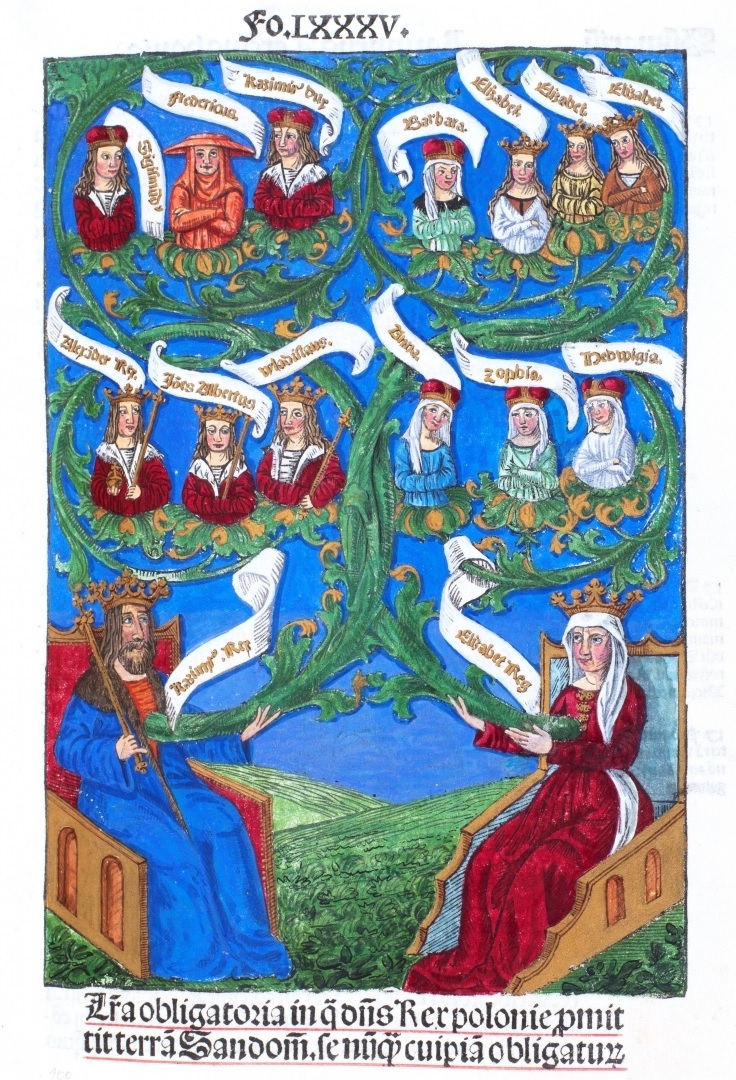
The Jagiellonian bloodline; King Casimir IV was the central figure of the Jagiellonian period and the father of four kings.

The reign of the young Władysław III (1434–44), who succeeded his father Władysław II Jagiełło and ruled as king of Poland and Hungary, was cut short by his death at the Battle of Varna, during a crusade against the Ottoman Empire. This disaster led to an interregnum of three years that ended with the accession of Władysław's brother Casimir IV Jagiellon in 1447.

Critical developments of the Jagiellonian period were concentrated during Casimir IV's long reign, which lasted until 1492. In 1454, Royal Prussia was incorporated by Poland and the Thirteen Years' War of 1454–66 with the Teutonic state ensued. In 1466, the milestone Peace of Thorn was concluded. This treaty divided Prussia to create East Prussia, the future Duchy of Prussia, a separate entity that functioned as a fief of Poland under the administration of the Teutonic Knights. Poland also confronted the Ottoman Empire and the Crimean Tatars in the south, and in the east helped Lithuania fight the Grand Duchy of Moscow. The country was developing as a feudal state, with a predominantly agricultural economy and an increasingly dominant landed nobility. Kraków, the royal capital, was turning into a major academic and cultural center, and in 1473 the first printing press began operating there. With the growing importance of szlachta (middle and lower nobility), the king's council evolved to become by 1493 a bicameral General Sejm (parliament) that no longer represented exclusively top dignitaries of the realm.

The Nihil novi act, adopted in 1505 by the Sejm, transferred most of the legislative power from the monarch to the Sejm. This event marked the beginning of the period known as "Golden Liberty", when the state was ruled in principle by the "free and equal" Polish nobility. In the 16th century, the massive development of folwark agribusinesses operated by the nobility led to increasingly abusive conditions for the peasant serfs who worked them. The political monopoly of the nobles also stifled the development of cities, some of which were thriving during the late Jagiellonian era, and limited the rights of townspeople, effectively holding back the emergence of the middle class.

=== Early modern Poland under Sigismund I and Sigismund II ===
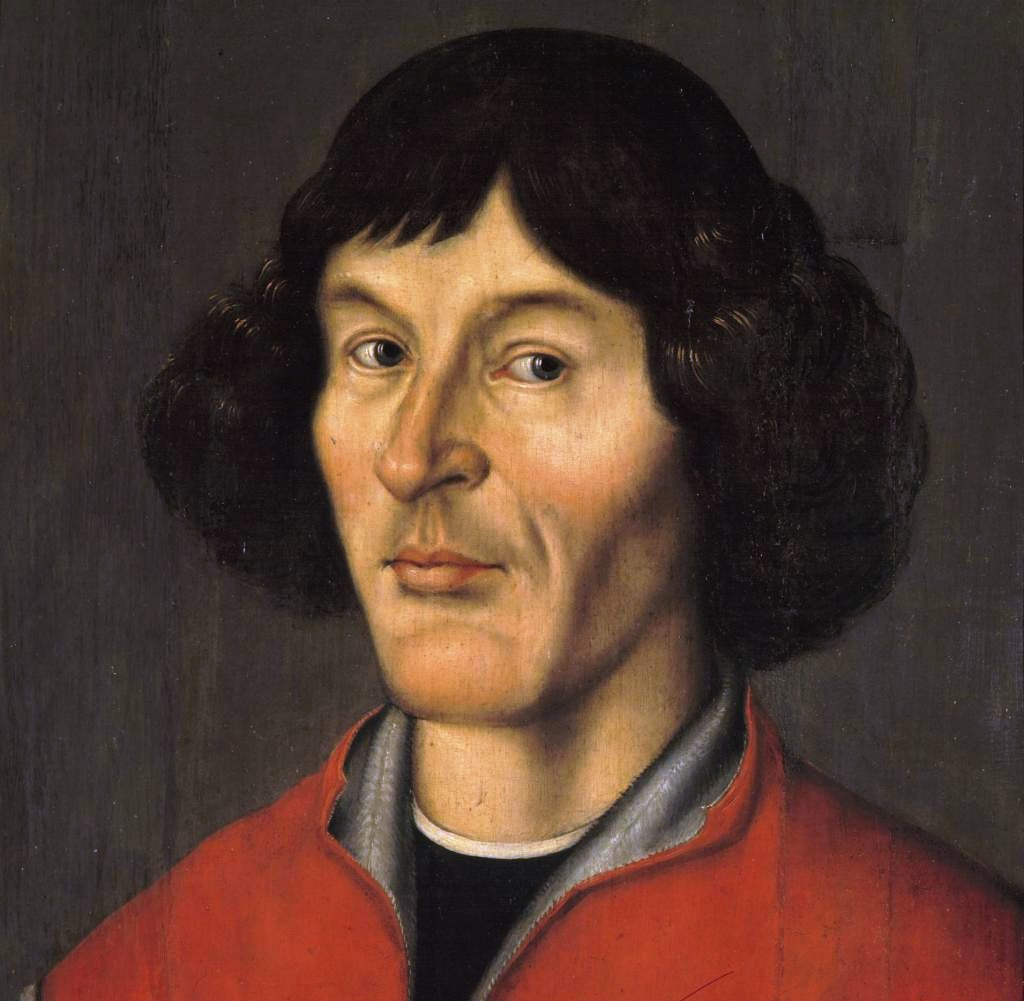
Nicolaus Copernicus formulated the heliocentric model of the Solar System that placed the Sun rather than the Earth at its center

In the 16th century, Protestant Reformation movements made deep inroads into Polish Christianity and the resulting Reformation in Poland involved a number of different denominations. The policies of religious tolerance that developed in Poland were nearly unique in Europe at that time and many who fled regions torn by religious strife found refuge in Poland. The reigns of King Sigismund I the Old (1506–1548) and King Sigismund II Augustus (1548–1572) witnessed an intense cultivation of culture and science (a Golden Age of the Renaissance in Poland), of which the astronomer Nicolaus Copernicus (1473–1543) is the best known representative. Jan Kochanowski (1530–1584) was a poet and the premier artistic personality of the period. In 1525, during the reign of Sigismund I, the Teutonic Order was secularized and Duke Albert performed an act of homage before the Polish king (the Prussian Homage) for his fief, the Duchy of Prussia. Mazovia was finally fully incorporated into the Polish Crown in 1529.

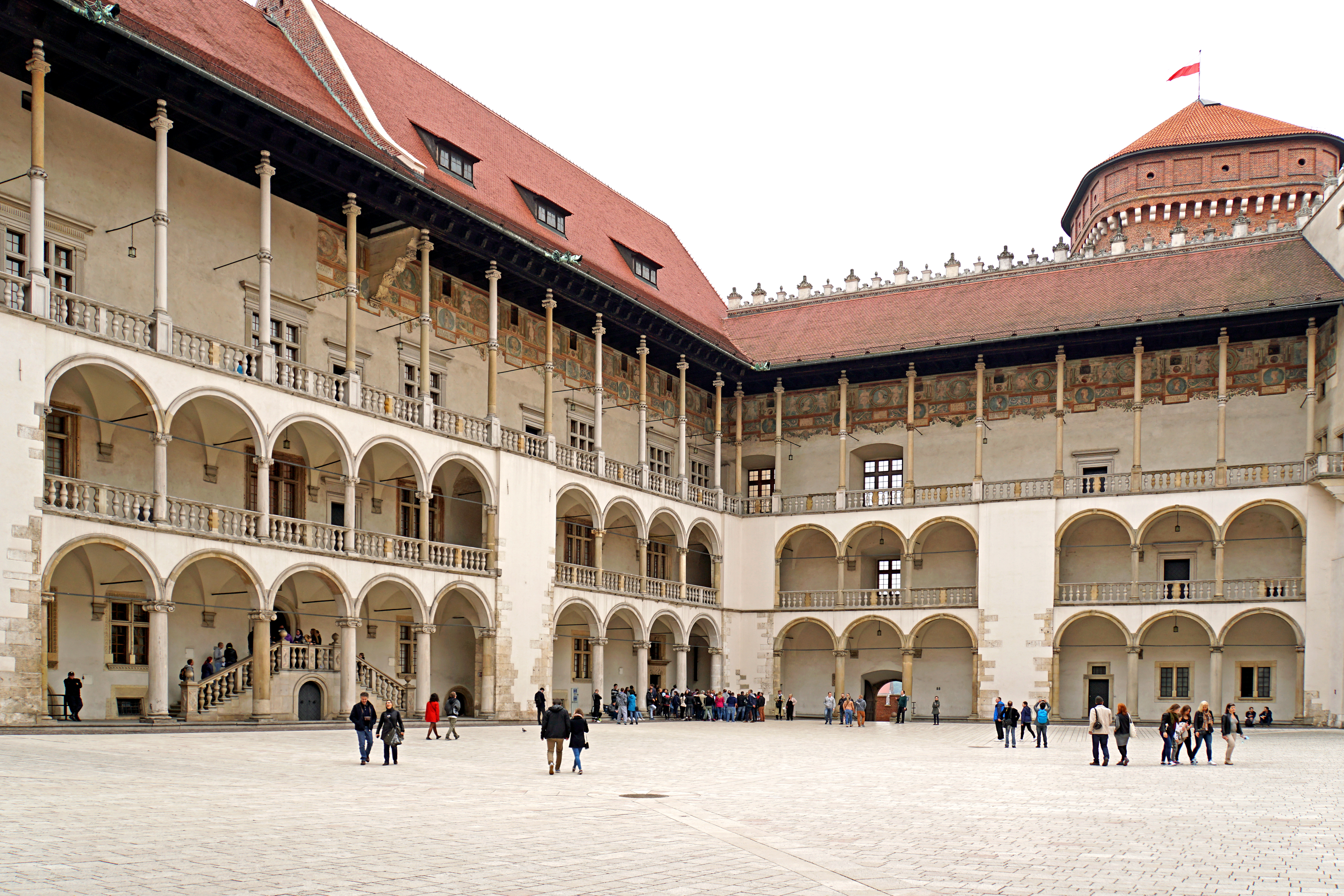
The Italian courtyard at Wawel Castle in Kraków, the former seat of Polish monarchs

The reign of Sigismund II ended the Jagiellonian period, but gave rise to the Union of Lublin (1569), an ultimate fulfillment of the union with Lithuania. This agreement transferred Ukraine from the Grand Duchy of Lithuania to Poland and transformed the Polish–Lithuanian polity into a real union, preserving it beyond the death of the childless Sigismund II, whose active involvement made the completion of this process possible.

Livonia in the far northeast was incorporated by Poland in 1561 and Poland entered the Livonian War against Russia. The executionist movement, which attempted to check the progressing domination of the state by the magnate families of Poland and Lithuania, peaked at the Sejm in Piotrków in 1562–63. On the religious front, the Polish Brethren split from the Calvinists, and the Protestant Brest Bible was published in 1563. The Jesuits, who arrived in 1564, were destined to make a major impact on Poland's history.

== Polish–Lithuanian Commonwealth ==
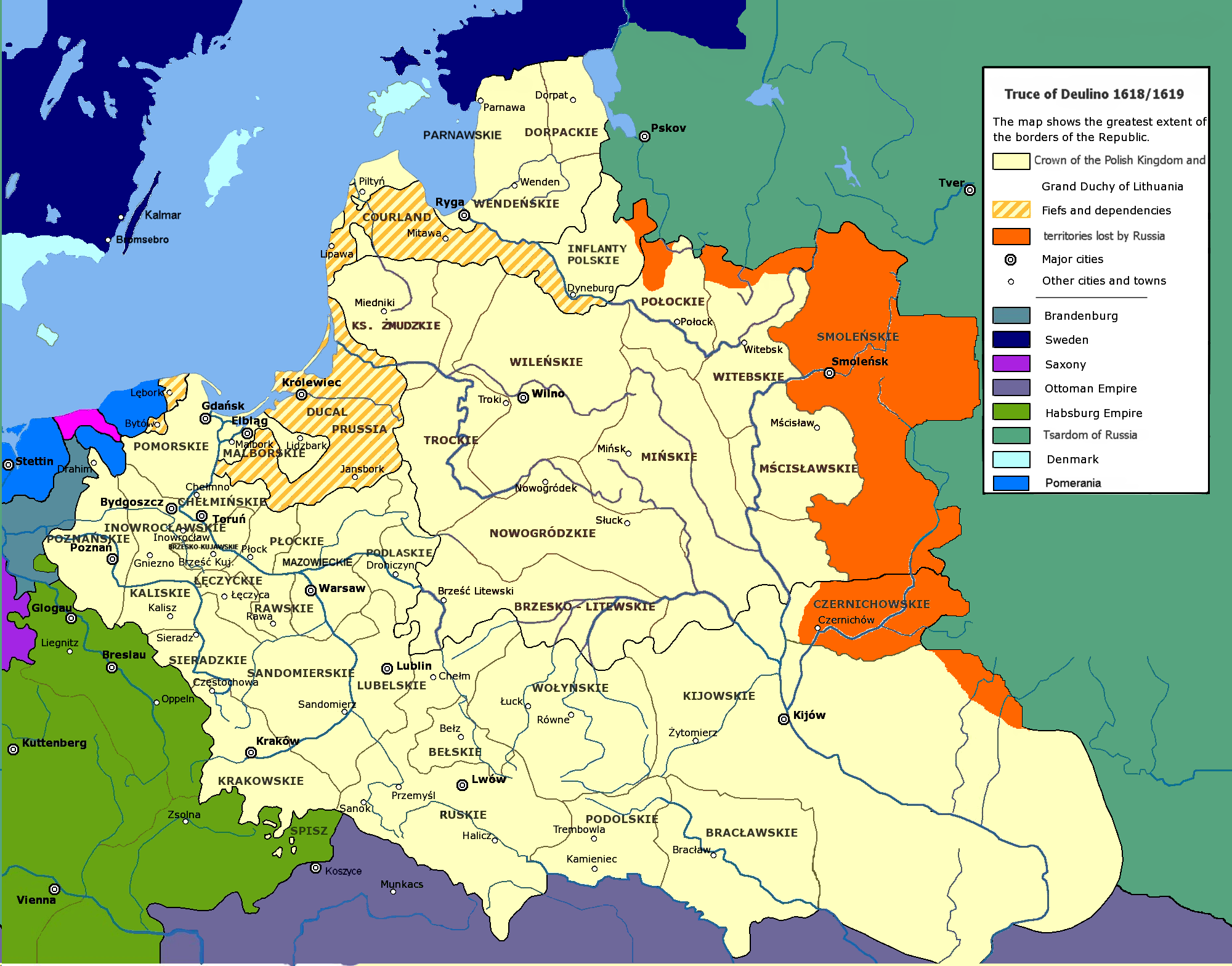
The Polish–Lithuanian Commonwealth at its greatest extent, after the Truce of Deulino of 1619

=== Establishment (1569–1648) ===
==== Union of Lublin ====
The Union of Lublin of 1569 established the Polish–Lithuanian Commonwealth, a federal state more closely unified than the earlier political arrangement between Poland and Lithuania. The union was run largely by the nobility through the system of central parliament and local assemblies, but was headed by elected kings. The formal rule of the nobility, who were proportionally more numerous than in other European countries, constituted an early democratic system ("a sophisticated noble democracy"), in contrast to the absolute monarchies prevalent at that time in the rest of Europe.

The beginning of the Commonwealth coincided with a period in Polish history when great political power was attained and advancements in civilization and prosperity took place. The Polish–Lithuanian Union became an influential participant in European affairs and a vital cultural entity that spread Western culture (with Polish characteristics) eastward. In the second half of the 16th century and the first half of the 17th century, the Commonwealth was one of the largest and most populous states in contemporary Europe, with an area approaching one million square kilometres (0.39 million square miles) and a population of about ten million. Its economy was dominated by export-focused agriculture. Nationwide religious toleration was guaranteed at the Warsaw Confederation in 1573.

==== First elective kings ====
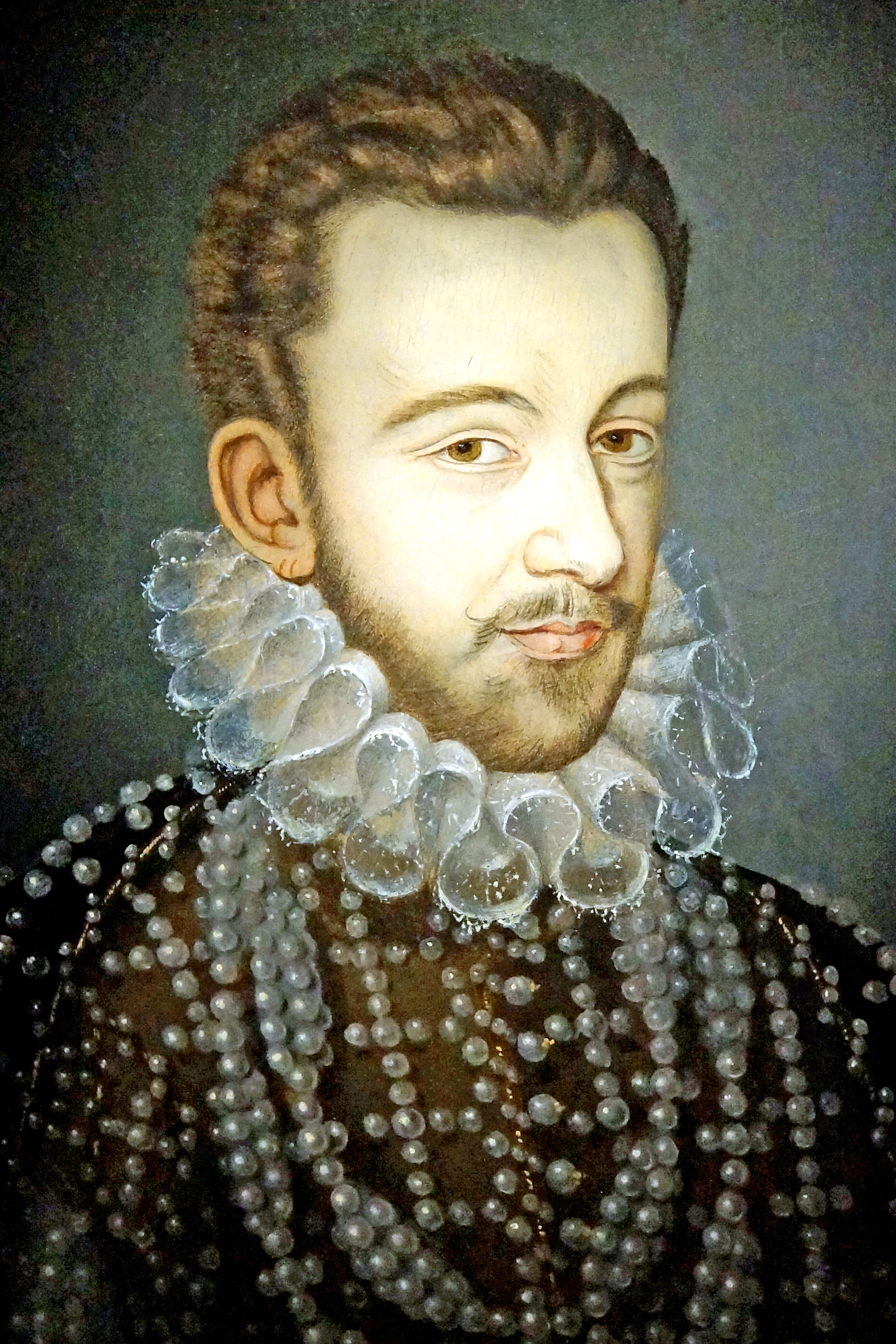
Henry de Valois, later Henry III of France, was the first elected Polish king in 1573

After the rule of the Jagiellonian dynasty ended in 1572, Henry of Valois (later King Henry III of France) was the winner of the first "free election" by the Polish nobility, held in 1573. He had to agree to the restrictive pacta conventa obligations and fled Poland in 1574 when news arrived of the vacancy of the French throne, to which he was the heir presumptive. From the start, the royal elections increased foreign influence in the Commonwealth as foreign powers sought to manipulate the Polish nobility to place candidates amicable to their interests. The reign of Stephen Báthory of Hungary followed (r. 1576–1586). He was militarily and domestically assertive and is revered in Polish historical tradition as a rare case of a successful elective king. The establishment of the legal Crown Tribunal in 1578 meant a transfer of many appellate cases from the royal to noble jurisdiction.

==== First kings of the Vasa dynasty ====
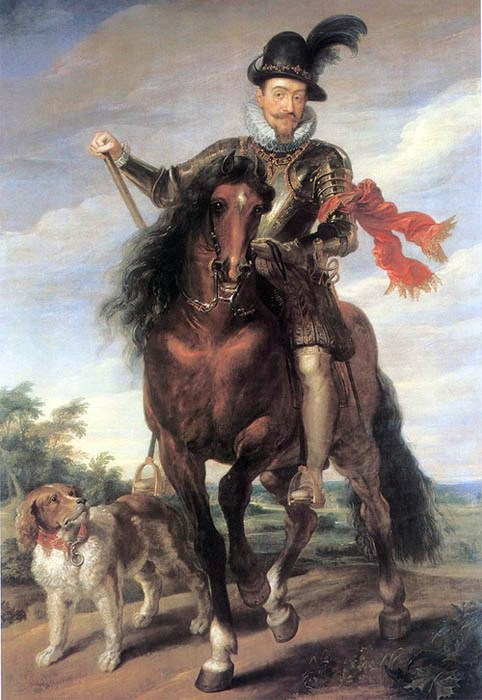
Sigismund III Vasa enjoyed a long reign, but his actions against religious minorities, expansionist ideas and involvement in dynastic affairs of Sweden, destabilized the Commonwealth.

A period of rule under the Swedish House of Vasa began in the Commonwealth in the year 1587. The first two kings from this dynasty, Sigismund III (r. 1587–1632) and Władysław IV (r. 1632–1648), repeatedly attempted to intrigue for accession to the throne of Sweden, which was a constant source of distraction for the affairs of the Commonwealth. At that time, the Catholic Church embarked on an ideological counter-offensive and the Counter-Reformation claimed many converts from Polish and Lithuanian Protestant circles. In 1596, the Union of Brest split the Eastern Christians of the Commonwealth to create the Uniate Church of the Eastern Rite, but subject to the authority of the pope. The Zebrzydowski rebellion against Sigismund III unfolded in 1606–1608.

Seeking supremacy in Eastern Europe, the Commonwealth fought wars with Russia between 1605 and 1618 in the wake of Russia's Time of Troubles; the series of conflicts is referred to as the Polish–Russian War or the Dymitriads. The efforts resulted in expansion of the eastern territories of the Polish–Lithuanian Commonwealth, but the goal of taking over the Russian throne for the Polish ruling dynasty was not achieved. Sweden sought supremacy in the Baltic during the Polish–Swedish wars of 1617–1629, and the Ottoman Empire pressed from the south in the Battles at Cecora in 1620 and Khotyn in 1621. The agricultural expansion and serfdom policies in Polish Ukraine resulted in a series of Cossack uprisings. Allied with the Habsburg monarchy, the Commonwealth did not directly participate in the Thirty Years' War.^{[s]} Władysław's IV reign was mostly peaceful, with a Russian invasion in the form of the Smolensk War of 1632–1634 successfully repelled. The Orthodox Church hierarchy, banned in Poland after the Union of Brest, was re-established in 1635.

=== Decline (1648–1764) ===
==== Deluge of wars ====
During the reign of John II Casimir Vasa (r. 1648–1668), the third and last king of his dynasty, the nobles' democracy fell into decline as a result of foreign invasions and domestic disorder. These calamities multiplied rather suddenly and marked the end of the Polish Golden Age. Their effect was to render the once powerful Commonwealth increasingly vulnerable to foreign intervention.

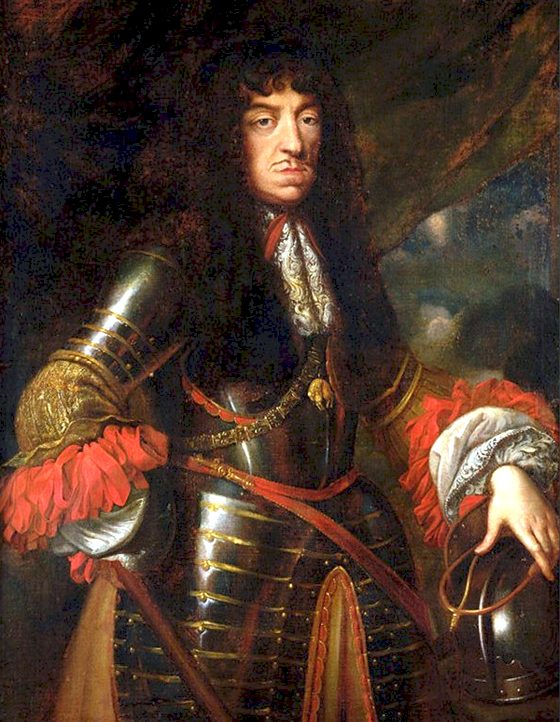
John II Casimir Vasa reigned during the Commonwealth's most difficult period. Frustrated with his inability to reform the state, he abdicated in 1668.

The Cossack Khmelnytsky Uprising of 1648–1657 engulfed the south-eastern regions of the Polish crown; its long-term effects were disastrous for the Commonwealth. The first liberum veto (a parliamentary device that allowed any member of the Sejm to dissolve a current session immediately) was exercised by a deputy in 1652. This practice would eventually weaken Poland's central government critically. In the Treaty of Pereyaslav (1654), the Ukrainian rebels declared themselves subjects of the Tsar of Russia. The Second Northern War raged through the core Polish lands in 1655–1660; it included a brutal and devastating invasion of Poland referred to as the Swedish Deluge. The war ended in 1660 with the Treaty of Oliva, which resulted in the loss of some of Poland's northern possessions. In 1657 the Treaty of Bromberg established the independence of the Duchy of Prussia. The Commonwealth forces did well in the Russo-Polish War (1654–1667), but the result was the permanent division of Ukraine between Poland and Russia, as agreed to in the Truce of Andrusovo (1667). Towards the end of the war, the Lubomirski's rebellion, a major magnate revolt against the king, destabilized and weakened the country. The large-scale slave raids of the Crimean Tatars also had highly deleterious effects on the Polish economy. Merkuriusz Polski, the first Polish newspaper, was published in 1661.

In 1668, grief-stricken at the recent death of his wife and frustrated by the disastrous political setbacks of his reign, John II Casimir abdicated the throne and fled to France.^{[z]}

==== John III Sobieski and last military victories ====
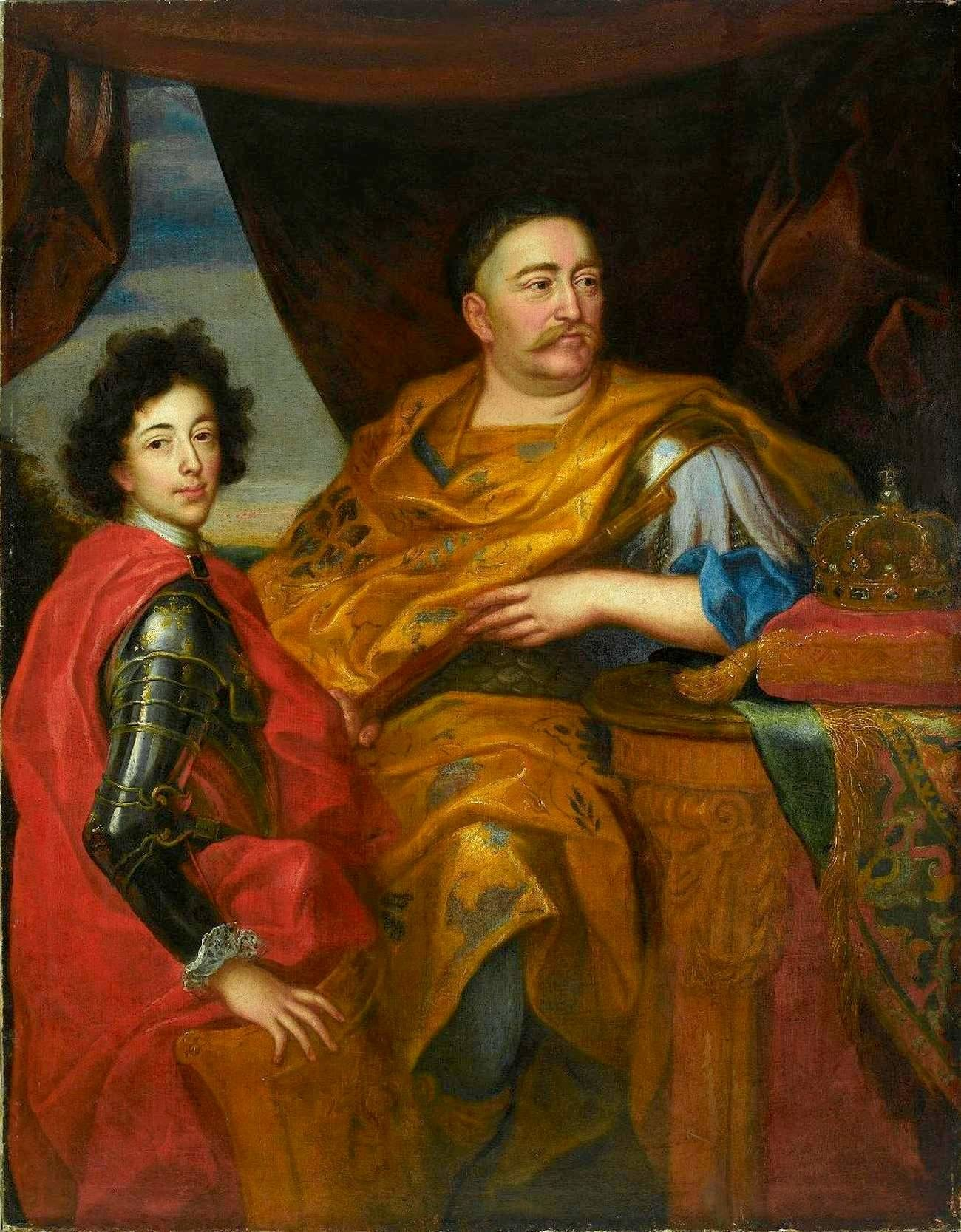
King John III Sobieski with his son Jakub, whom he tried to position to be his successor. Sobieski led the Commonwealth to its last great military victories.

King Michał Korybut Wiśniowiecki, a native Pole, was elected to replace John II Casimir in 1669. The Polish–Ottoman War (1672–1676) broke out during his reign, which lasted until 1673, and continued under his successor, John III Sobieski (r. 1674–1696). Sobieski intended to pursue Baltic area expansion (and to this end he signed the secret Treaty of Jaworów with France in 1675), but was forced instead to fight protracted wars with the Ottoman Empire. By doing so, Sobieski briefly revived the Commonwealth's military might. He defeated the expanding Muslims at the Battle of Khotyn in 1673 and decisively helped deliver Vienna from a Turkish onslaught at the Battle of Vienna in 1683. Sobieski's reign marked the last high point in the history of the Commonwealth: in the first half of the 18th century, Poland ceased to be an active player in international politics. The Treaty of Perpetual Peace (1686) with Russia was the final border settlement between the two countries before the First Partition of Poland in 1772.

The Commonwealth, subjected to almost constant warfare until 1720, suffered enormous population losses and massive damage to its economy and social structure. The government became ineffective in the wake of large-scale internal conflicts, corrupted legislative processes and manipulation by foreign interests. The nobility fell under the control of a handful of feuding magnate families with established territorial domains. The urban population and infrastructure fell into ruin, together with most peasant farms, whose inhabitants were subjected to increasingly extreme forms of serfdom. The development of science, culture and education came to a halt or regressed.

==== Saxon kings ====
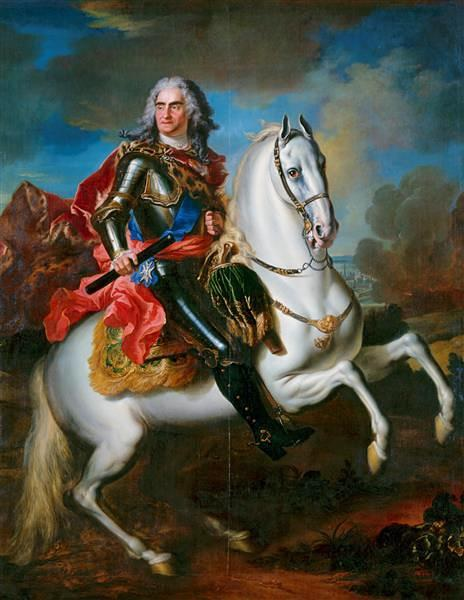
Augustus II the Strong, the first Saxon ruler of Poland. His death sparked the War of the Polish Succession.

The royal election of 1697 brought a ruler of the Saxon House of Wettin to the Polish throne: Augustus II the Strong (r. 1697–1733), who was able to assume the throne only by agreeing to convert to Roman Catholicism. He was succeeded by his son Augustus III (r. 1734–1763). The reigns of the Saxon kings (who were both simultaneously prince-electors of Saxony) were disrupted by competing candidates for the throne and witnessed further disintegration of the Commonwealth.

The Great Northern War of 1700–1721, a period seen by the contemporaries as a temporary eclipse, may have been the fatal blow that brought down the Polish political system. Stanisław Leszczyński was installed as king in 1704 under Swedish protection, but lasted only a few years. The Silent Sejm of 1717 marked the beginning of the Commonwealth's existence as a Russian protectorate: the Tsardom would guarantee the reform-impeding Golden Liberty of the nobility from that time on in order to cement the Commonwealth's weak central authority and a state of perpetual political impotence. In a resounding break with traditions of religious tolerance, Protestants were executed during the Tumult of Thorn in 1724. In 1732, Russia, Austria and Prussia, Poland's three increasingly powerful and scheming neighbors, entered into the secret Treaty of the Three Black Eagles with the intention of controlling the future royal succession in the Commonwealth. The War of the Polish Succession was fought in 1733–1735 to assist Leszczyński in assuming the throne of Poland for a second time. Amidst considerable foreign involvement, his efforts were unsuccessful. The Kingdom of Prussia became a strong regional power and succeeded in wresting the historically Polish province of Silesia from the Habsburg monarchy in the Silesian Wars; it thus constituted an ever-greater threat to Poland's security.

The personal union between the Commonwealth and the Electorate of Saxony did give rise to the emergence of a reform movement in the Commonwealth and the beginnings of the Polish Enlightenment culture, the major positive developments of this era. The first Polish public library was the Załuski Library in Warsaw, opened to the public in 1747.

=== Reforms and loss of statehood (1764–1795) ===
==== Czartoryski reforms and Stanisław August Poniatowski ====
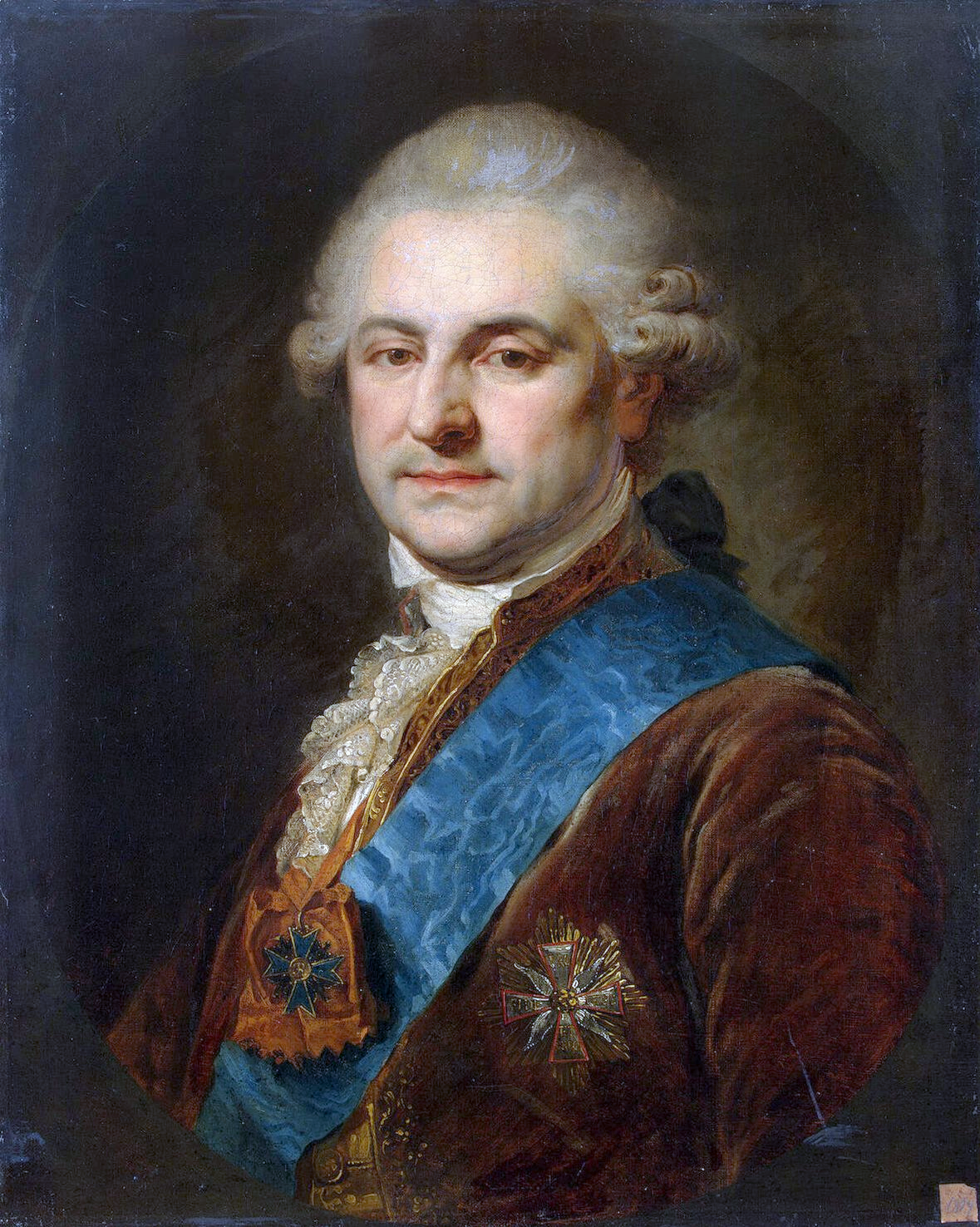
Stanisław August Poniatowski, the "enlightened" monarch

During the later part of the 18th century, fundamental internal reforms were attempted in the Polish–Lithuanian Commonwealth as it slid into extinction. The reform activity, initially promoted by the magnate Czartoryski family faction known as the Familia, provoked a hostile reaction and military response from neighboring powers, but it did create conditions that fostered economic improvement. The most populous urban center, the capital city of Warsaw, replaced Danzig (Gdańsk) as the leading trade center, and the importance of the more prosperous urban social classes increased. The last decades of the independent Commonwealth's existence were characterized by aggressive reform movements and far-reaching progress in the areas of education, intellectual life, art and the evolution of the social and political system.

The royal election of 1764 resulted in the elevation of Stanisław August Poniatowski, a refined and worldly aristocrat connected to the Czartoryski family, but hand-picked and imposed by Empress Catherine the Great of Russia, who expected him to be her obedient follower. Stanisław August ruled the Polish–Lithuanian state until its dissolution in 1795. The king spent his reign torn between his desire to implement reforms necessary to save the failing state and the perceived necessity of remaining in a subordinate relationship to his Russian sponsors.

The Bar Confederation (1768–1772) was a rebellion of nobles directed against Russia's influence in general and Stanisław August, who was seen as its representative, in particular. It was fought to preserve Poland's independence and the nobility's traditional interests. After several years, it was brought under control by forces loyal to the king and those of the Russian Empire.

Following the suppression of the Bar Confederation, parts of the Commonwealth were divided up among Prussia, Austria and Russia in 1772 at the instigation of Frederick the Great of Prussia, an action that became known as the First Partition of Poland: the outer provinces of the Commonwealth were seized by agreement among the country's three powerful neighbors and only a rump state remained. In 1773, the "Partition Sejm" ratified the partition under duress as a fait accompli. However, it also established the Commission of National Education, a pioneering in Europe education authority often called the world's first ministry of education.

==== The Great Sejm of 1788–1791 and the Constitution of 3 May 1791 ====
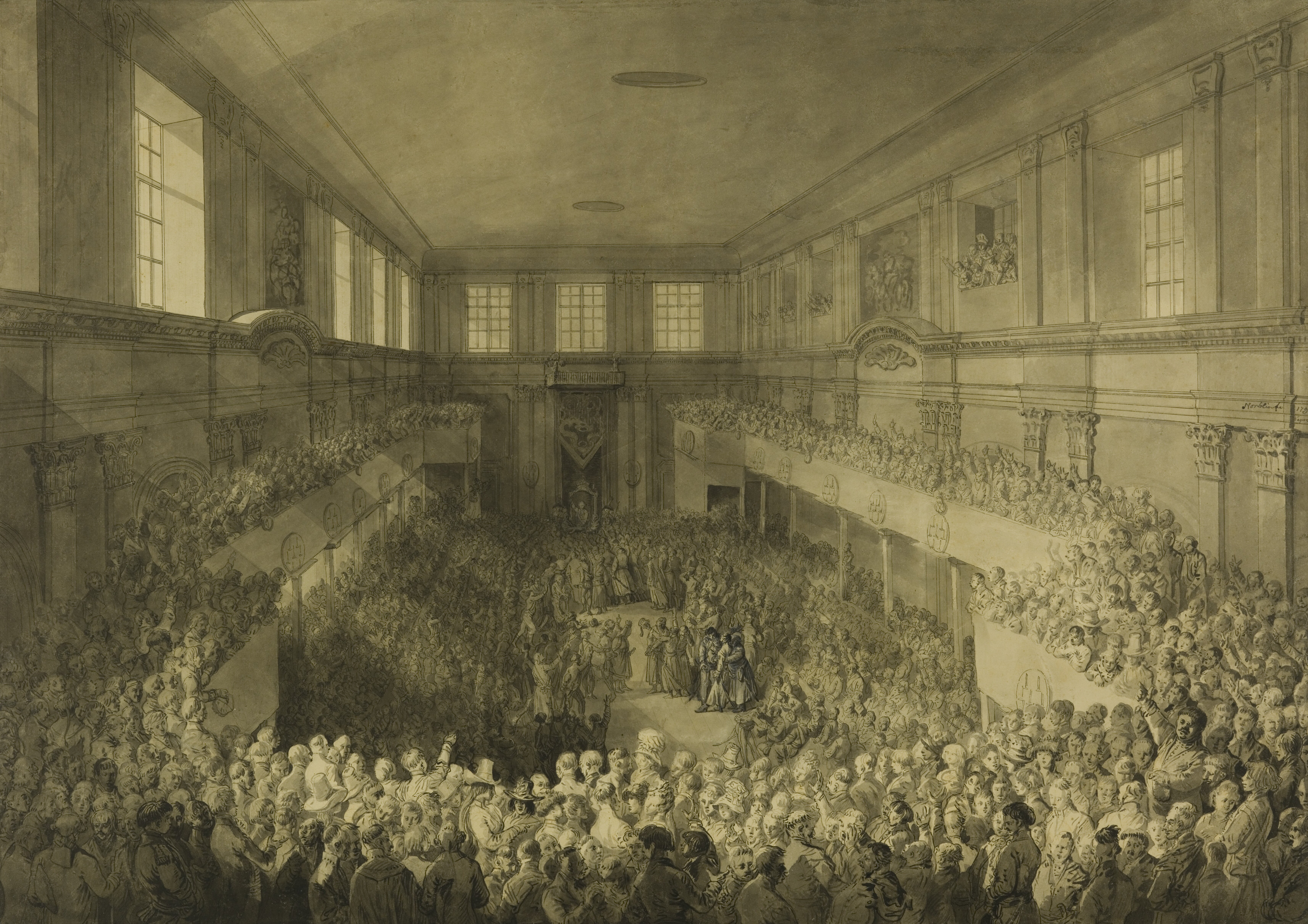
The Great Sejm adopted the Constitution of 3 May 1791 at the Royal Castle, Warsaw

The long-lasting session of parliament convened by King Stanisław August is known as the Great Sejm or Four-Year Sejm; it first met in 1788. Its landmark achievement was the passing of the Constitution of 3 May 1791, the first singular pronouncement of a supreme law of the state in modern Europe. A moderately reformist document condemned by detractors as sympathetic to the ideals of the French Revolution, it soon generated strong opposition from the conservative circles of the Commonwealth's upper nobility and from Empress Catherine of Russia, who was determined to prevent the rebirth of a strong Commonwealth. The nobility's Targowica Confederation, formed in Russian imperial capital of Saint Petersburg, appealed to Catherine for help, and in May 1792, the Russian army entered the territory of the Commonwealth. The Polish–Russian War of 1792, a defensive war fought by the forces of the Commonwealth against Russian invaders, ended when the Polish king, convinced of the futility of resistance, capitulated by joining the Targowica Confederation. The Russian-allied confederation took over the government, but Russia and Prussia in 1793 arranged for the Second Partition of Poland anyway. The partition left the country with a critically reduced territory that rendered it essentially incapable of an independent existence. The Commonwealth's Grodno Sejm of 1793, the last Sejm of the state's existence, was compelled to confirm the new partition.

==== The Kościuszko Uprising of 1794 and the end of Polish–Lithuanian state ====
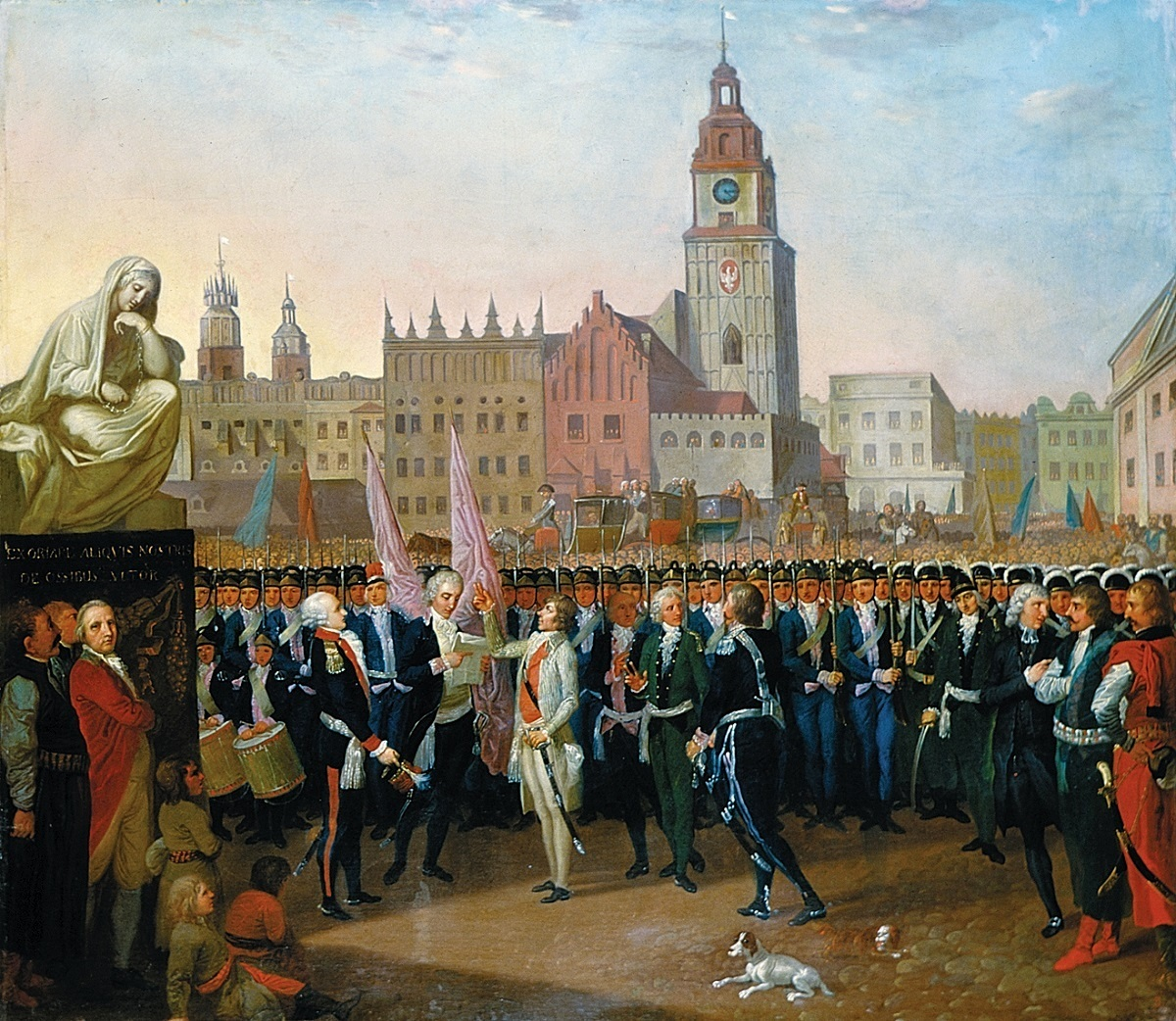
Tadeusz Kościuszko's call for a national uprising, Kraków 1794

Radicalized by recent events, Polish reformers (whether in exile or still resident in the reduced area remaining to the Commonwealth) were soon working on preparations for a national insurrection. Tadeusz Kościuszko, a popular general and a veteran of the American Revolution, was chosen as its leader. He returned from abroad and issued Kościuszko's proclamation in Kraków on March 24, 1794. It called for a national uprising under his supreme command. Kościuszko emancipated many peasants in order to enroll them as kosynierzy in his army, but the hard-fought insurrection, despite widespread national support, proved incapable of generating the foreign assistance necessary for its success. In the end, it was suppressed by the combined forces of Russia and Prussia, with Warsaw captured in November 1794 in the aftermath of the Battle of Praga.

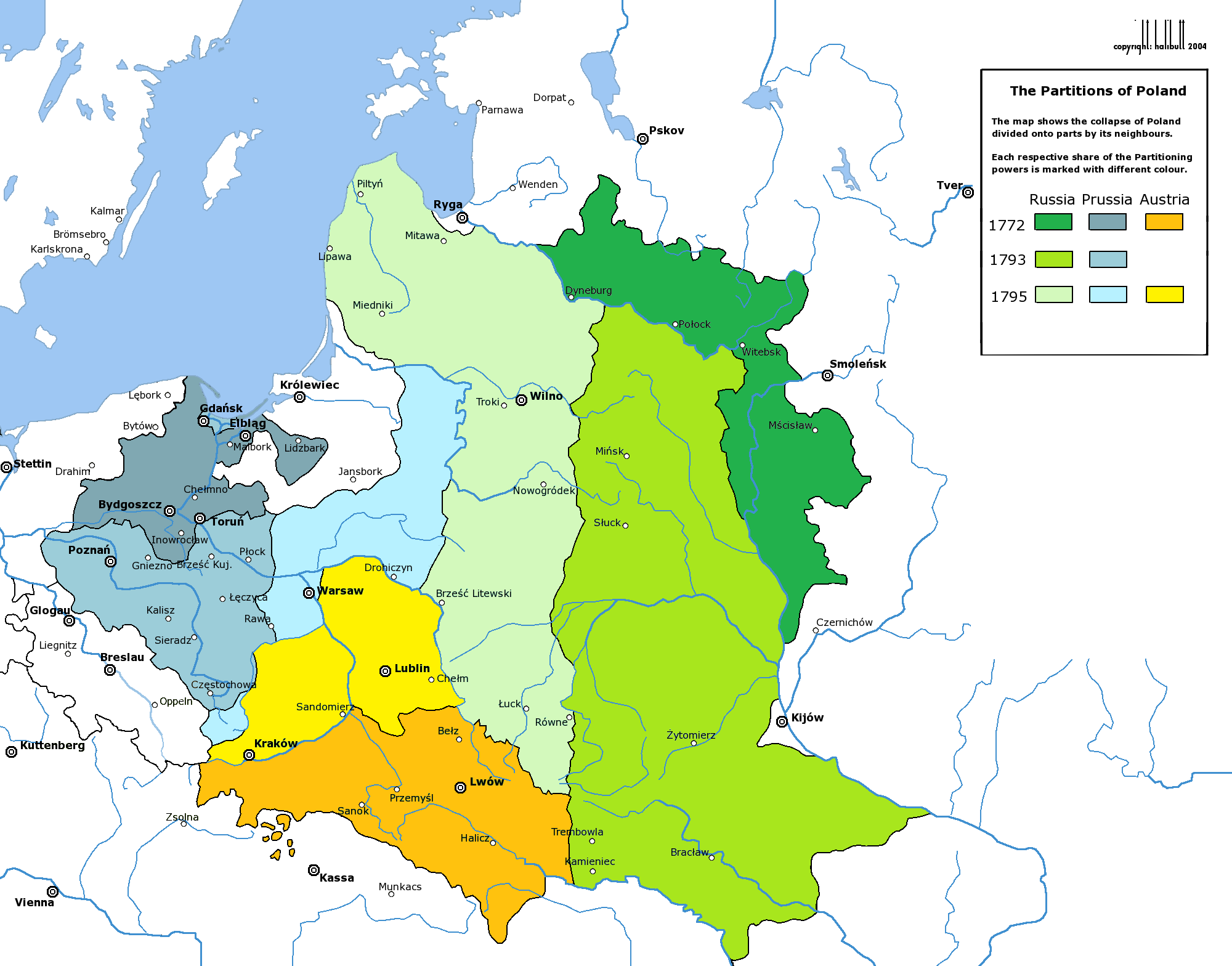
The three Partitions of the Polish–Lithuanian Commonwealth (1772, 1793, and 1795)

In 1795, a Third Partition of Poland was undertaken by Russia, Prussia and Austria as a final division of territory that resulted in the effective dissolution of the Polish–Lithuanian Commonwealth. King Stanisław August Poniatowski was escorted to Grodno, forced to abdicate, and retired to Saint Petersburg. Tadeusz Kościuszko, initially imprisoned, was allowed to emigrate to the United States in 1796.

The response of the Polish leadership to the last partition is a matter of historical debate. Literary scholars found that the dominant emotion of the first decade was despair that produced a moral desert ruled by violence and treason. On the other hand, historians have looked for signs of resistance to foreign rule. Apart from those who went into exile, the nobility took oaths of loyalty to their new rulers and served as officers in their armies.

== Partitioned Poland (1795–1918) ==
=== Armed resistance (1795–1864) ===
==== Napoleonic wars ====
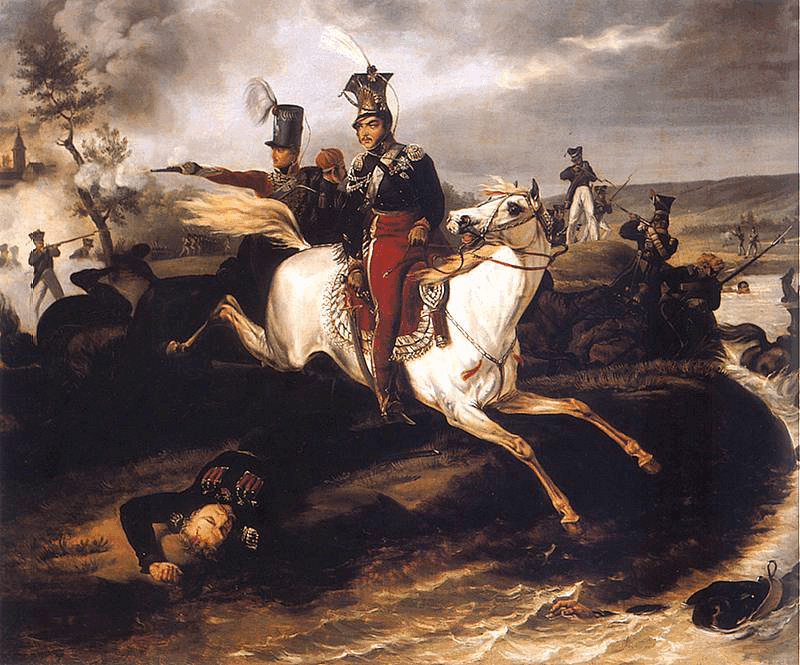
The death of Józef Poniatowski, Marshal of the French Empire, at the Battle of Leipzig

Although no sovereign Polish state existed between 1795 and 1918, the idea of Polish independence was kept alive throughout the 19th century. There were a number of uprisings and other armed undertakings waged against the partitioning powers. Military efforts after the partitions were first based on the alliances of Polish émigrés with post-revolutionary France. Jan Henryk Dąbrowski's Polish Legions fought in French campaigns outside of Poland between 1797 and 1802 in hopes that their involvement and contribution would be rewarded with the liberation of their Polish homeland. The Polish national anthem, "Poland Is Not Yet Lost", or "Dąbrowski's Mazurka", was written in praise of his actions by Józef Wybicki in 1797.

The Duchy of Warsaw, a small, semi-independent Polish state, was created in 1807 by Napoleon in the wake of his defeat of Prussia and the signing of the Treaties of Tilsit with Emperor Alexander I of Russia. The Army of the Duchy of Warsaw, led by Józef Poniatowski, participated in numerous campaigns in alliance with France, including the successful Austro-Polish War of 1809, which, combined with the outcomes of other theaters of the War of the Fifth Coalition, resulted in an enlargement of the duchy's territory. The French invasion of Russia in 1812 and the German Campaign of 1813 saw the duchy's last military engagements. The Constitution of the Duchy of Warsaw abolished serfdom as a reflection of the ideals of the French Revolution, but it did not promote land reform.

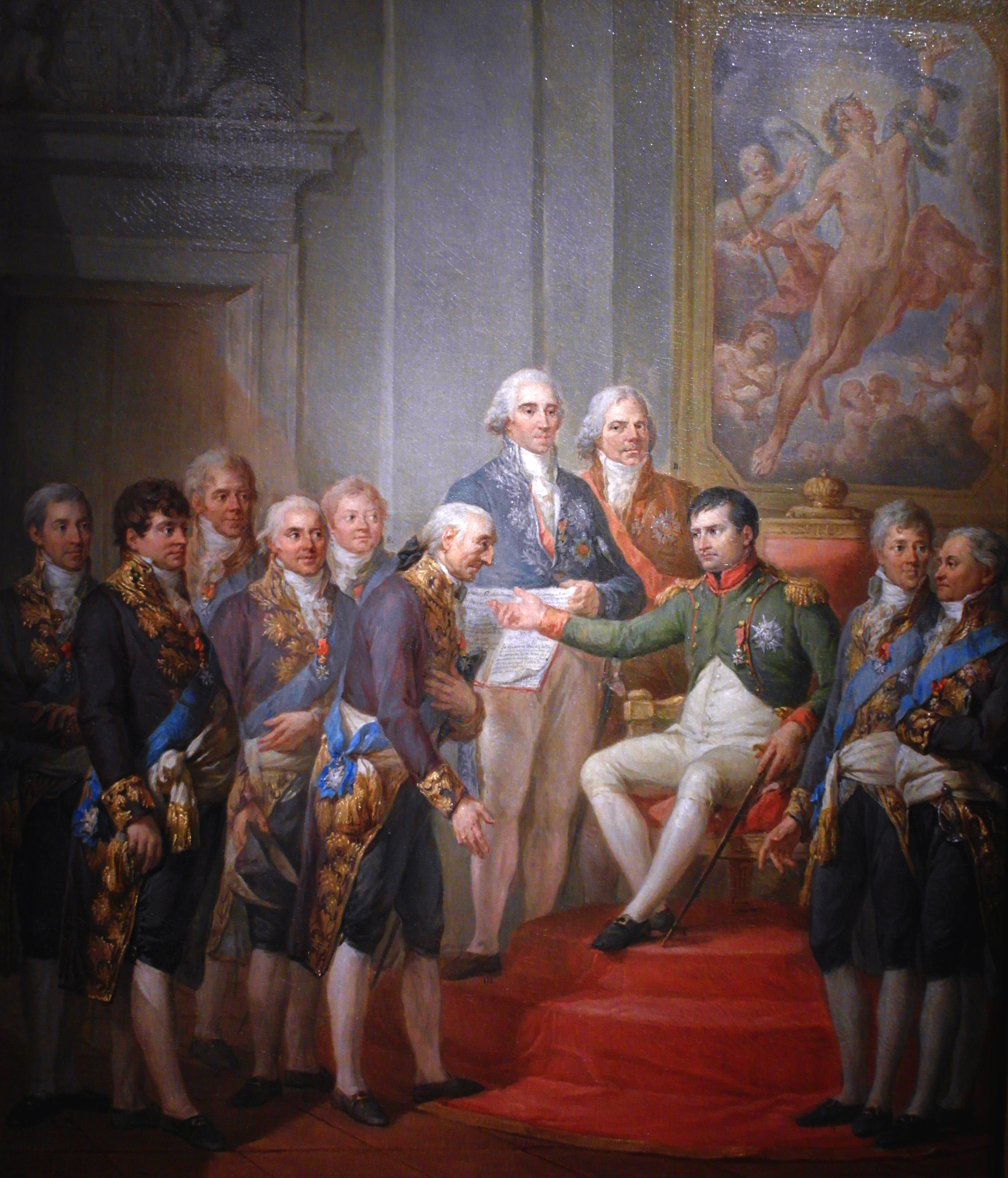
Napoleon Bonaparte establishing the Duchy of Warsaw under French protection, 1807

==== The Congress of Vienna ====
After Napoleon's defeat, a new European order was established at the Congress of Vienna, which met in the years 1814 and 1815. Adam Jerzy Czartoryski, a former close associate of Emperor Alexander I, became the leading advocate for the Polish national cause. The Congress implemented a new partition scheme, which took into account some of the gains realized by the Poles during the Napoleonic period.

The Duchy of Warsaw was replaced in 1815 with a new Kingdom of Poland, unofficially known as Congress Poland. The residual Polish kingdom was joined to the Russian Empire in a personal union under the Russian tsar and it was allowed its own constitution and military. East of the kingdom, large areas of the former Polish–Lithuanian Commonwealth remained directly incorporated into the Russian Empire as the Western Krai. These territories, along with Congress Poland, are generally considered to form the Russian Partition. The Russian, Prussian, and Austrian "partitions" are informal names for the lands of the former Commonwealth, not actual units of administrative division of Polish–Lithuanian territories after partitions. The Prussian Partition included a portion separated as the Grand Duchy of Posen. Peasants under the Prussian administration were gradually enfranchised under the reforms of 1811 and 1823. The limited legal reforms in the Austrian Partition were overshadowed by its rural poverty. The Free City of Cracow was a tiny republic created by the Congress of Vienna under the joint supervision of the three partitioning powers. Despite the bleak political situation (from the standpoint of Polish patriots), economic progress was made in the lands taken over by foreign powers because the period after the Congress of Vienna witnessed a significant development in the building of early industry.

Economic historians have made new estimates on GDP per capita, 1790–1910. They confirm the hypothesis of semi-peripheral development of Polish territories in the 19th century and the slow process of catching-up with the core economies.

==== The Uprising of November 1830 ====
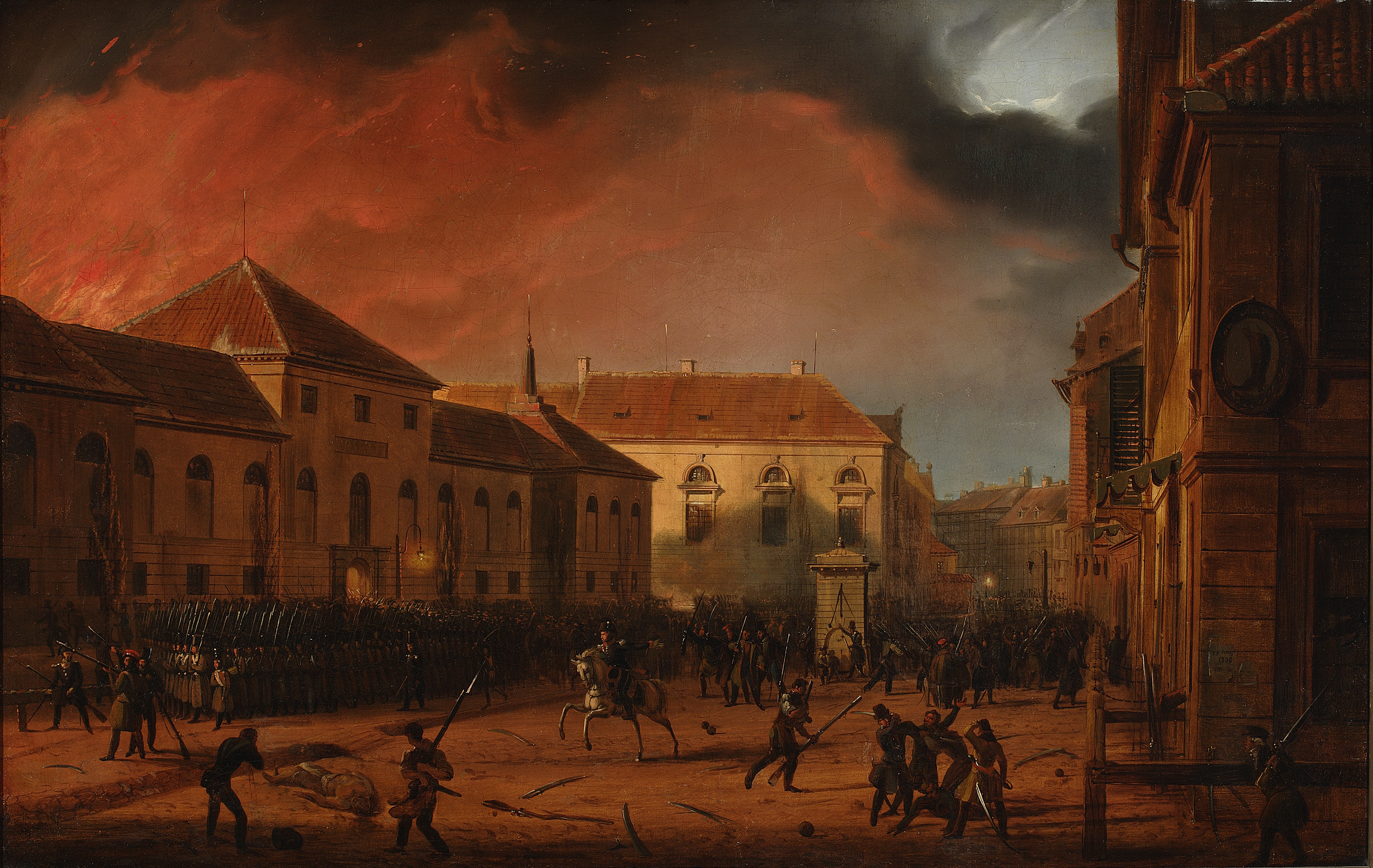
The capture of the Warsaw arsenal at the beginning of the November Uprising of 1830

The increasingly repressive policies of the partitioning powers led to resistance movements in partitioned Poland, and in 1830 Polish patriots staged the November Uprising. This revolt developed into a full-scale war with Russia, but the leadership was taken over by Polish conservatives who were reluctant to challenge the empire and hostile to broadening the independence movement's social base through measures such as land reform. Despite the significant resources mobilized, a series of errors by several successive chief commanders appointed by the insurgent Polish National Government led to the defeat of its forces by the Russian army in 1831. Congress Poland lost its constitution and military, but formally remained a separate administrative unit within the Russian Empire.

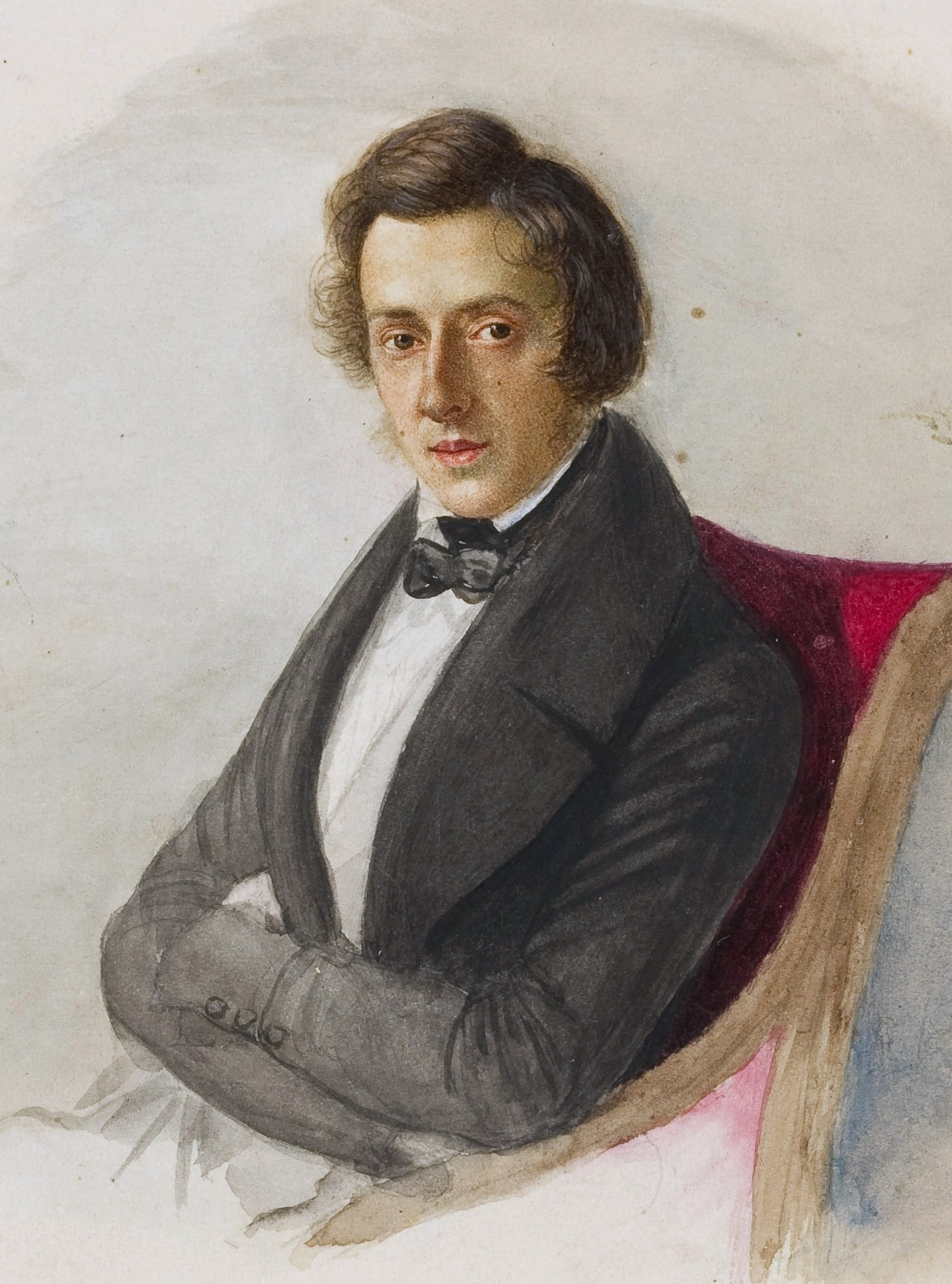
Chopin, a Romantic composer of piano works, including many inspired by Polish traditional dance music

After the defeat of the November Uprising, thousands of former Polish combatants and other activists emigrated to Western Europe. This phenomenon, known as the Great Emigration, soon dominated Polish political and intellectual life. Together with the leaders of the independence movement, the Polish community abroad included the greatest Polish literary and artistic minds, including the Romantic poets Adam Mickiewicz, Juliusz Słowacki, Cyprian Norwid, and the composer Frédéric Chopin. In occupied and repressed Poland, some sought progress through nonviolent activism focused on education and economy, known as organic work; others, in cooperation with the emigrant circles, organized conspiracies and prepared for the next armed insurrection.

==== Revolts of the era of the Spring of Nations ====
The planned national uprising failed to materialize because the authorities in the partitions found out about secret preparations. The Greater Poland uprising ended in a fiasco in early 1846. In the Kraków uprising of February 1846, patriotic action was combined with revolutionary demands, but the result was the incorporation of the Free City of Cracow into the Austrian Partition. The Austrian officials took advantage of peasant discontent and incited villagers against the noble-dominated insurgent units. This resulted in the Galician slaughter of 1846, a large-scale rebellion of serfs seeking relief from their post-feudal condition of mandatory labor as practiced in folwarks. The uprising freed many from bondage and hastened decisions that led to the abolition of Polish serfdom in the Austrian Empire in 1848. A new wave of Polish involvement in revolutionary movements soon took place in the partitions and in other parts of Europe in the context of the Spring of Nations revolutions of 1848 (e.g. Józef Bem's participation in the revolutions in Austria and Hungary). The 1848 German revolutions precipitated the Greater Poland uprising of 1848, in which peasants in the Prussian Partition, who were by then largely enfranchised, played a prominent role.

==== The Uprising of January 1863 ====
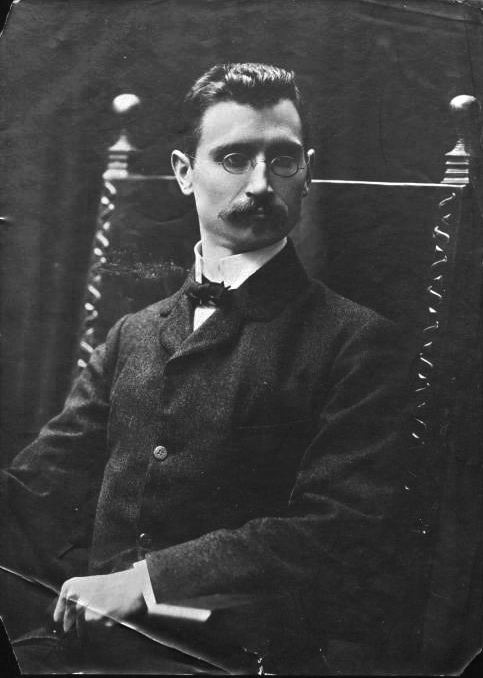
Romuald Traugutt, the last supreme commander of the 1863 Uprising

As a matter of continuous policy, the Russian autocracy kept assailing Polish national core values of language, religion and culture. In consequence, despite the limited liberalization measures allowed in Congress Poland under the rule of Tsar Alexander II of Russia, a renewal of popular liberation activities took place in 1860–1861. During large-scale demonstrations in Warsaw, Russian forces inflicted numerous casualties on the civilian participants. The "Red", or left-wing faction of Polish activists, which promoted peasant enfranchisement and cooperated with Russian revolutionaries, became involved in immediate preparations for a national uprising. The "White", or right-wing faction, was inclined to cooperate with the Russian authorities and countered with partial reform proposals. In order to cripple the manpower potential of the Reds, Aleksander Wielopolski, the conservative leader of the government of Congress Poland, arranged for a partial selective conscription of young Poles for the Russian army in the years 1862 and 1863. This action hastened the outbreak of hostilities. The January Uprising, joined and led after the initial period by the Whites, was fought by partisan units against an overwhelmingly advantaged enemy. The uprising lasted from January 1863 to the spring of 1864, when Romuald Traugutt, the last supreme commander of the insurgency, was captured by the tsarist police.

On 2 March 1864, the Russian authority, compelled by the uprising to compete for the loyalty of Polish peasants, officially published an enfranchisement decree in Congress Poland along the lines of an earlier land reform proclamation of the insurgents. The act created the conditions necessary for the development of the capitalist system on central Polish lands. At the time when most Poles realized the futility of armed resistance without external support, the various sections of Polish society were undergoing deep and far-reaching evolution in the areas of social, economic and cultural development.

=== Formation of modern Polish society under foreign rule (1864–1914) ===
==== Repression and organic work ====
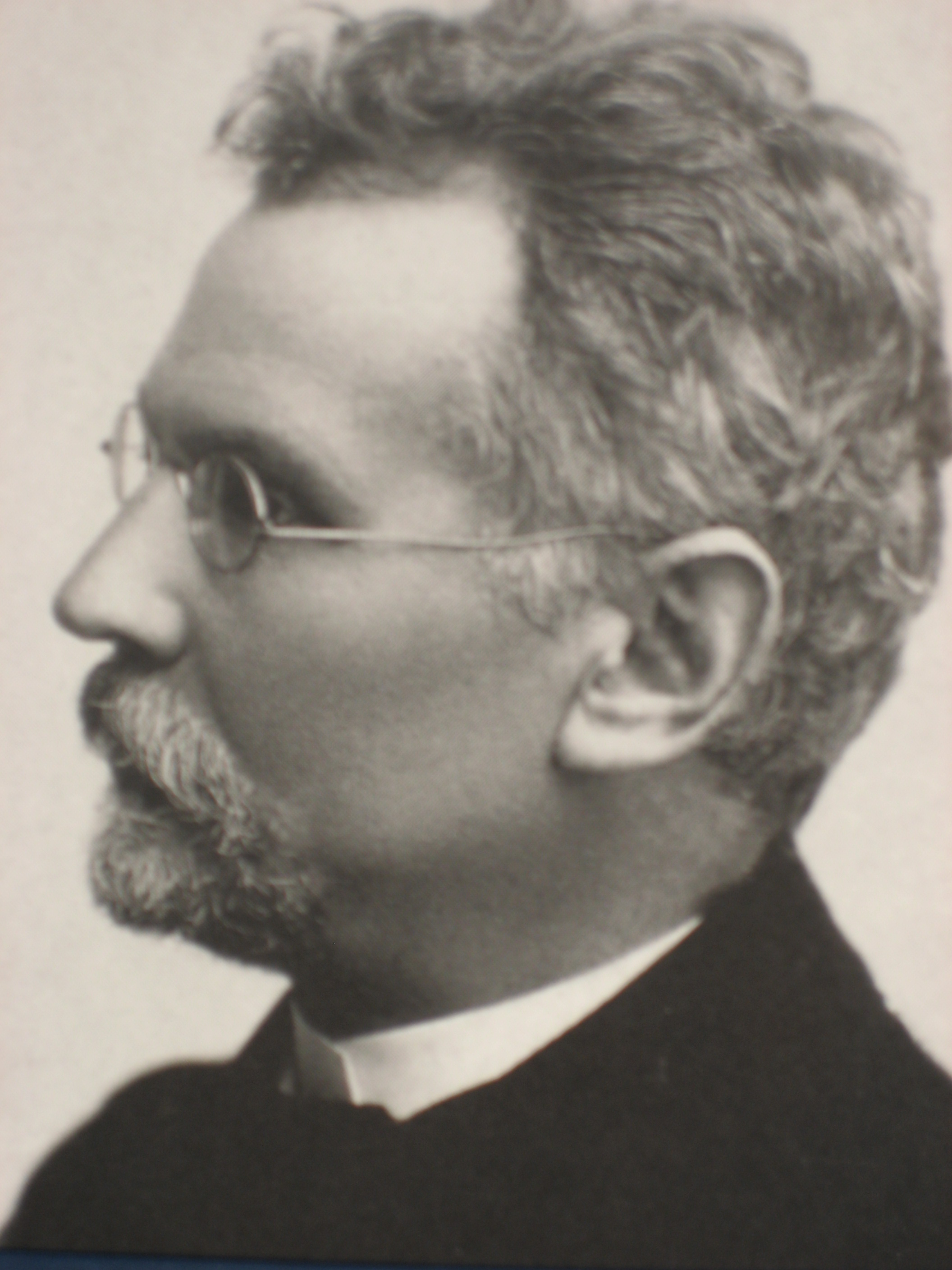
Bolesław Prus (1847–1912), a leading novelist, journalist and philosopher of Poland's Positivism movement

The failure of the January Uprising in Poland caused a major psychological trauma and became a historic watershed; indeed, it sparked the development of modern Polish nationalism. The Poles, subjected within the territories under the Russian and Prussian administrations to still stricter controls and increased persecution, sought to preserve their identity in non-violent ways. After the uprising, Congress Poland was downgraded in official usage from the "Kingdom of Poland" to the "Vistula Land" and was more fully integrated into Russia proper, but not entirely obliterated. The Russian and German languages were imposed in all public communication, and the Catholic Church was not spared from severe repression. Public education was increasingly subjected to Russification and Germanisation measures. Illiteracy was reduced, most effectively in the Prussian partition, but education in the Polish language was preserved mostly through unofficial efforts. The Prussian government pursued German colonization, including the purchase of Polish-owned land. On the other hand, the region of Galicia (western Ukraine and southern Poland) experienced a gradual relaxation of authoritarian policies and even a Polish cultural revival. Economically and socially backward, it was under the milder rule of the Austro-Hungarian Monarchy and from 1867 was increasingly allowed limited autonomy. Stańczycy, a conservative Polish pro-Austrian faction led by great land owners, dominated the Galician government. The Polish Academy of Learning (an academy of sciences) was founded in Kraków in 1872.

Social activities termed "organic work" consisted of self-help organizations that promoted economic advancement and work on improving the competitiveness of Polish-owned businesses, industrial, agricultural or other. New commercial methods of generating higher productivity were discussed and implemented through trade associations and special interest groups, while Polish banking and cooperative financial institutions made the necessary business loans available. The other major area of effort in organic work was educational and intellectual development of the common people. Many libraries and reading rooms were established in small towns and villages, and numerous printed periodicals manifested the growing interest in popular education. Scientific and educational societies were active in a number of cities. Such activities were most pronounced in the Prussian Partition.

Positivism in Poland replaced Romanticism as the leading intellectual, social and literary trend. It reflected the ideals and values of the emerging urban bourgeoisie. Around 1890, the urban classes gradually abandoned the positivist ideas and came under the influence of modern pan-European nationalism.

==== Economic development and social change ====
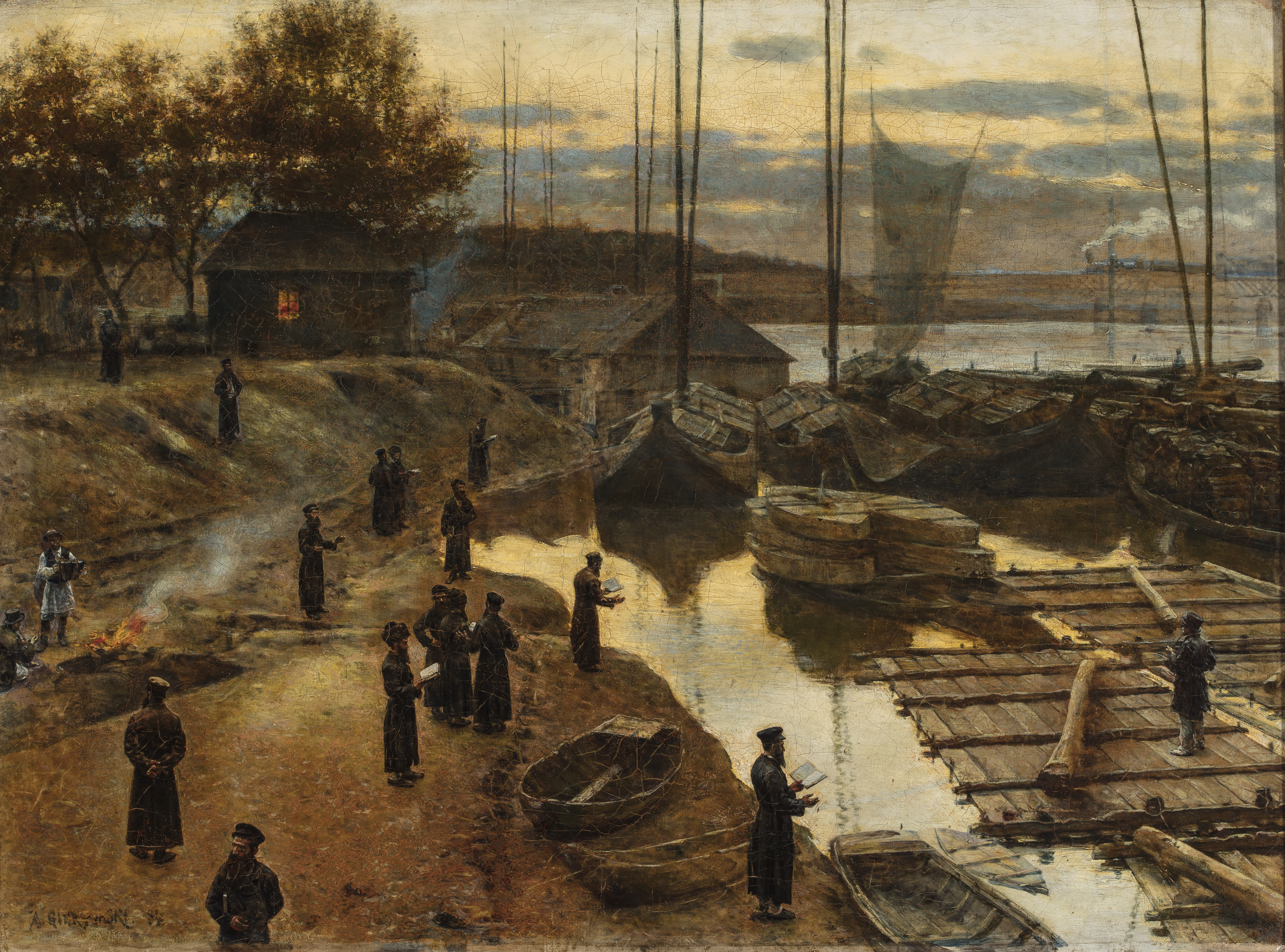
Many Jews emigrated from the Polish–Lithuanian lands in the late 19th and early 20th centuries, but most remained to form a large ethnic minority

Under the partitioning powers, economic diversification and progress, including large-scale industrialisation, were introduced in the traditionally agrarian Polish lands, but this development turned out to be very uneven. Advanced agriculture was practiced in the Prussian Partition, except for Upper Silesia, where the coal-mining industry created a large labor force. The densest network of railroads was built in German-ruled western Poland. In Russian Congress Poland, a striking growth of industry, railways and towns took place, all against the background of an extensive, but less productive agriculture. The industrial initiative, capital and know-how were provided largely by entrepreneurs who were not ethnic Poles. Warsaw (a metallurgical center) and Łódź (a textiles center) grew rapidly, as did the total proportion of urban population, making the region the most economically advanced in the Russian Empire (industrial production exceeded agricultural production there by 1909). The coming of the railways spurred some industrial growth even in the vast Russian Partition territories outside of Congress Poland. The Austrian Partition was rural and poor, except for the industrialized Cieszyn Silesia area. Galician economic expansion after 1890 included oil extraction and resulted in the growth of Lemberg (Lwów, Lviv) and Kraków.

Economic and social changes involving land reform and industrialization, combined with the effects of foreign domination, altered the centuries-old social structure of Polish society. Among the newly emergent strata were wealthy industrialists and financiers, distinct from the traditional, but still critically important landed aristocracy. The intelligentsia, an educated, professional or business middle class, often originated from lower gentry, landless or alienated from their rural possessions, and from urban people. Many smaller agricultural enterprises based on serfdom did not survive the land reforms. The industrial proletariat, a new underprivileged class, was composed mainly of poor peasants or townspeople forced by deteriorating conditions to migrate and search for work in urban centers in their countries of origin or abroad. Millions of residents of the former Commonwealth of various ethnic groups worked or settled in Europe and in North and South America.

Social and economic changes were partial and gradual. The degree of industrialisation, relatively fast-paced in some areas, lagged behind the advanced regions of Western Europe. The three partitions developed different economies and were more economically integrated with their mother states than with each other. In the Prussian Partition, for example, agricultural production depended heavily on the German market, whereas the industrial sector of Congress Poland relied more on the Russian market.

==== Nationalism, socialism and other movements ====
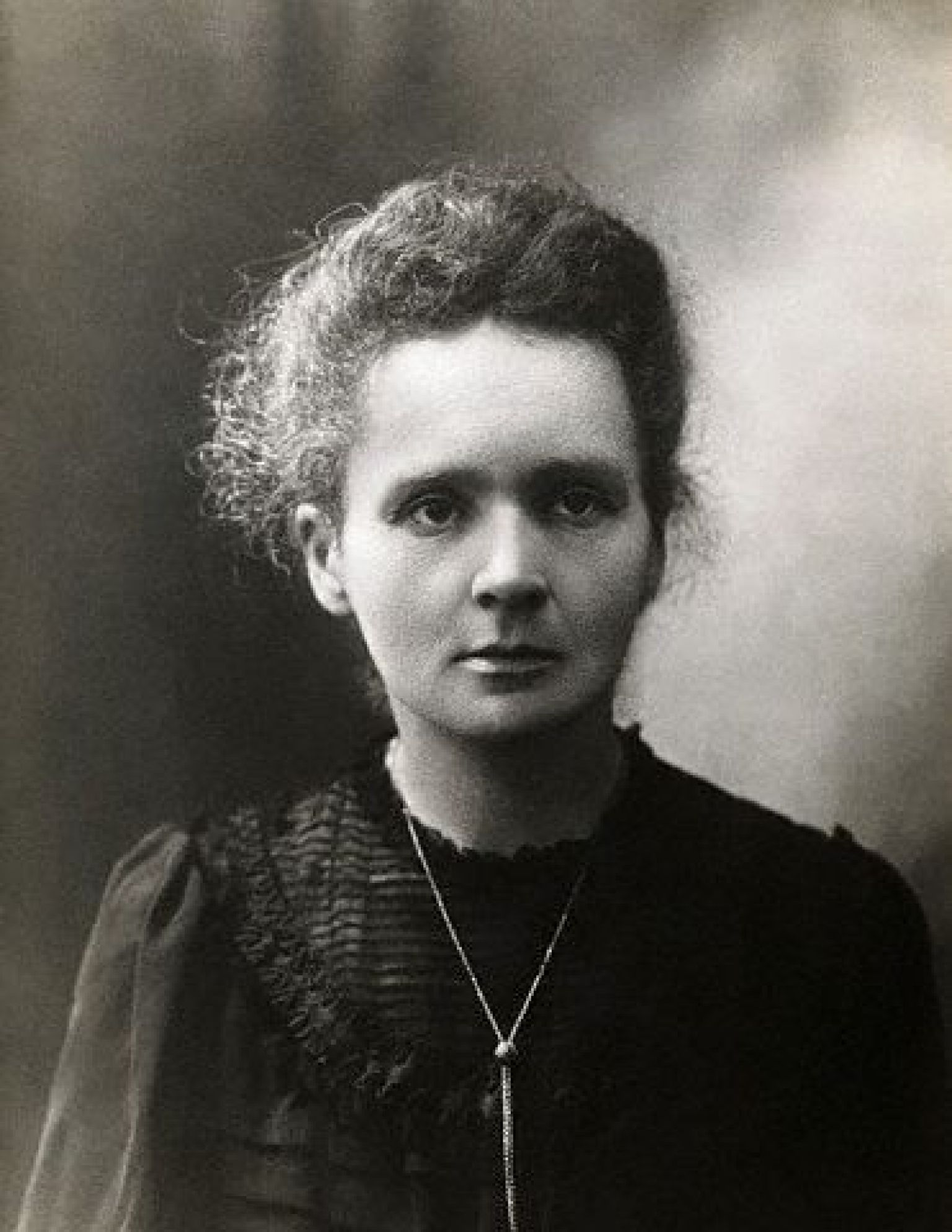
Marie Curie, discoverer of radioactive elements

In the 1870s–1890s, large-scale socialist, nationalist, agrarian and other political movements of great ideological fervor became established in partitioned Poland and Lithuania, along with corresponding political parties to promote them. Of the major parties, the socialist First Proletariat was founded in 1882, the Polish League (precursor of National Democracy) in 1887, the Polish Social Democratic Party of Galicia and Silesia in 1890, the Polish Socialist Party in 1892, the Marxist Social Democracy of the Kingdom of Poland and Lithuania in 1893, the agrarian People's Party of Galicia in 1895 and the Jewish socialist Bund in 1897. Christian democracy regional associations allied with the Catholic Church were also active; they united into the Polish Christian Democratic Party in 1919.

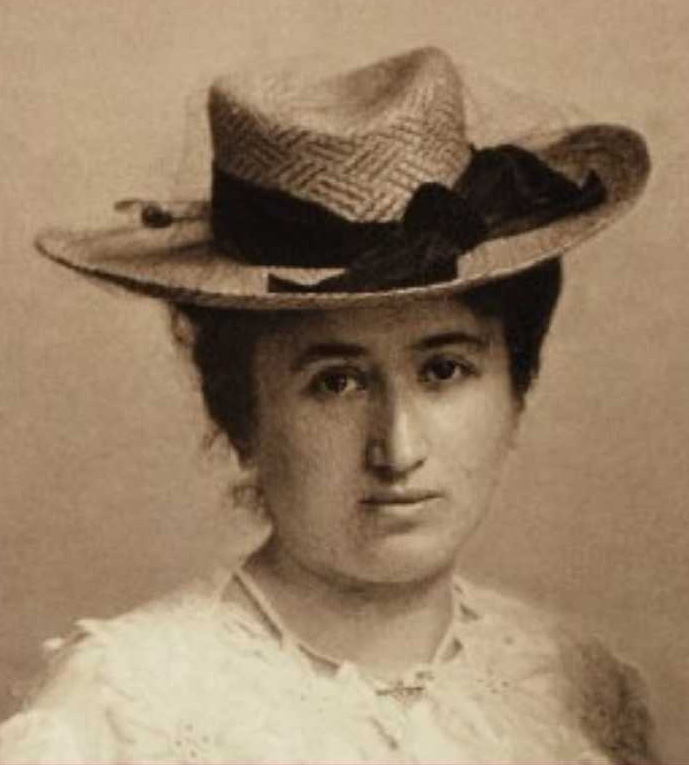
Rosa Luxemburg, leader of the Social Democracy of the Kingdom of Poland and Lithuania

The main minority ethnic groups of the former Commonwealth, including Ukrainians, Lithuanians, Belarusians and Jews, were getting involved in their own national movements and plans, which met with disapproval on the part of those Polish independence activists who counted on an eventual rebirth of the Commonwealth or the rise of a Commonwealth-inspired federal structure (a political movement referred to as Prometheism).

Around the start of the 20th century, the Young Poland cultural movement, centered in Austrian Galicia, took advantage of a milieu conducive to liberal expression in that region and was the source of Poland's finest artistic and literary productions. In this same era, Marie Skłodowska Curie, a pioneer radiation scientist, performed her groundbreaking research in Paris.

==== The Revolution of 1905 ====
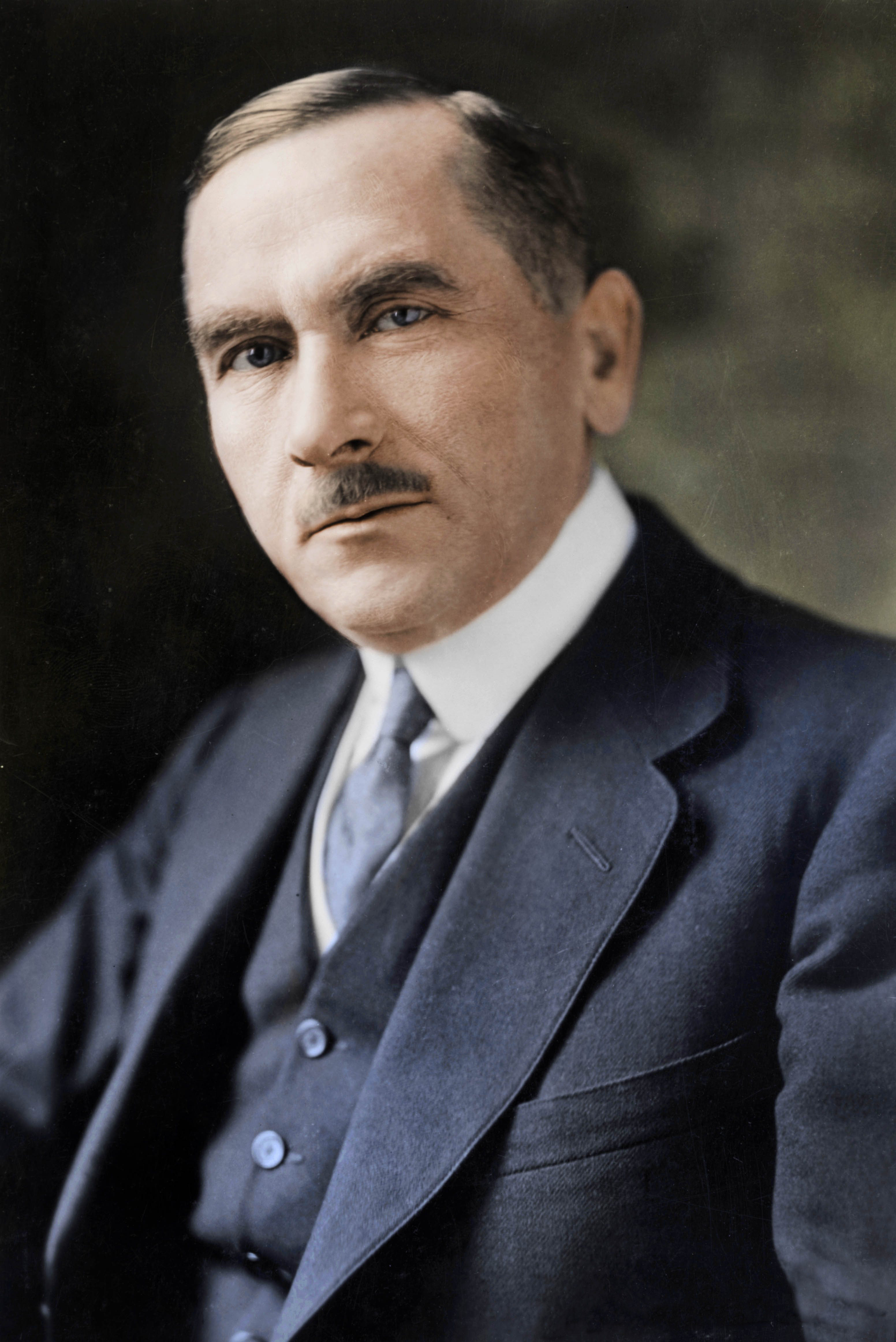
Roman Dmowski's National Democracy ideology proved highly influential in Polish politics. He favored the dominance of Polish-speaking Catholics in civic life without concern for the rights of ethnic minorities, in particular the Jews, whose emigration he advocated.

The Revolution of 1905–1907 in Russian Poland, the result of many years of pent-up political frustrations and stifled national ambitions, was marked by political maneuvering, strikes and rebellion. The revolt was part of much broader disturbances throughout the Russian Empire associated with the general Revolution of 1905. In Poland, the principal revolutionary figures were Roman Dmowski and Józef Piłsudski. Dmowski was associated with the right-wing nationalist movement National Democracy, whereas Piłsudski was associated with the Polish Socialist Party. As the authorities re-established control within the Russian Empire, the revolt in Congress Poland, placed under martial law, withered as well, partially as a result of tsarist concessions in the areas of national and workers' rights, including Polish representation in the newly created Russian Duma. The collapse of the revolt in the Russian Partition, coupled with intensified Germanization in the Prussian Partition, left Austrian Galicia as the territory where Polish patriotic action was most likely to flourish.

In the Austrian Partition, Polish culture was openly cultivated, and in the Prussian Partition, there were high levels of education and living standards, but the Russian Partition remained of primary importance for the Polish nation and its aspirations. About 15.5 million Polish-speakers lived in the territories most densely populated by Poles: the western part of the Russian Partition, the Prussian Partition and the western Austrian Partition. Ethnically Polish settlement spread over a large area further to the east, including its greatest concentration in the Vilnius Region, amounted to only over 20% of that number.

Polish paramilitary organizations oriented toward independence, such as the Union of Active Struggle, were formed in 1908–1914, mainly in Galicia. The Poles were divided and their political parties fragmented on the eve of World War I, with Dmowski's National Democracy (pro-Entente) and Piłsudski's faction assuming opposing positions.

=== World War I and the issue of Poland's independence ===
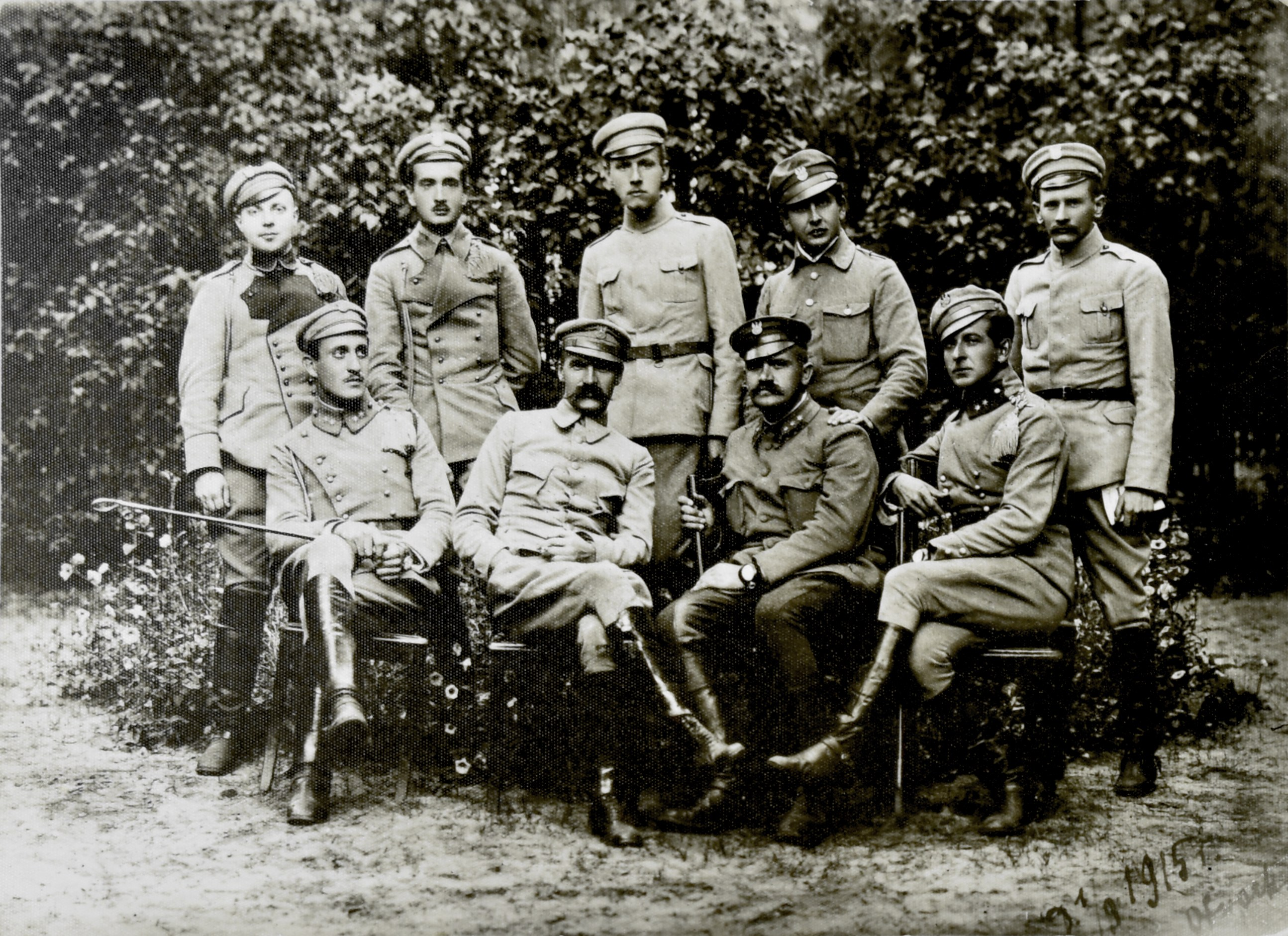
"The Commandant" Józef Piłsudski with his legionaries in 1915

The outbreak of World War I in the Polish lands offered Poles unexpected hopes for achieving independence as a result of the turbulence that engulfed the empires of the partitioning powers. All three of the monarchies that had benefited from the partition of Polish territories (Germany, Austria and Russia) were dissolved by the end of the war, and many of their territories were dispersed into new political units. At the start of the war, the Poles found themselves conscripted into the armies of the partitioning powers in a war that was not theirs. Furthermore, they were frequently forced to fight each other, since the armies of Germany and Austria were allied against Russia. Piłsudski's paramilitary units stationed in Galicia were turned into the Polish Legions in 1914 and as a part of the Austro-Hungarian Army fought on the Russian front until 1917, when the formation was disbanded. Piłsudski, who refused demands that his men fight under German command, was arrested and imprisoned by the Germans and became a heroic symbol of Polish nationalism.

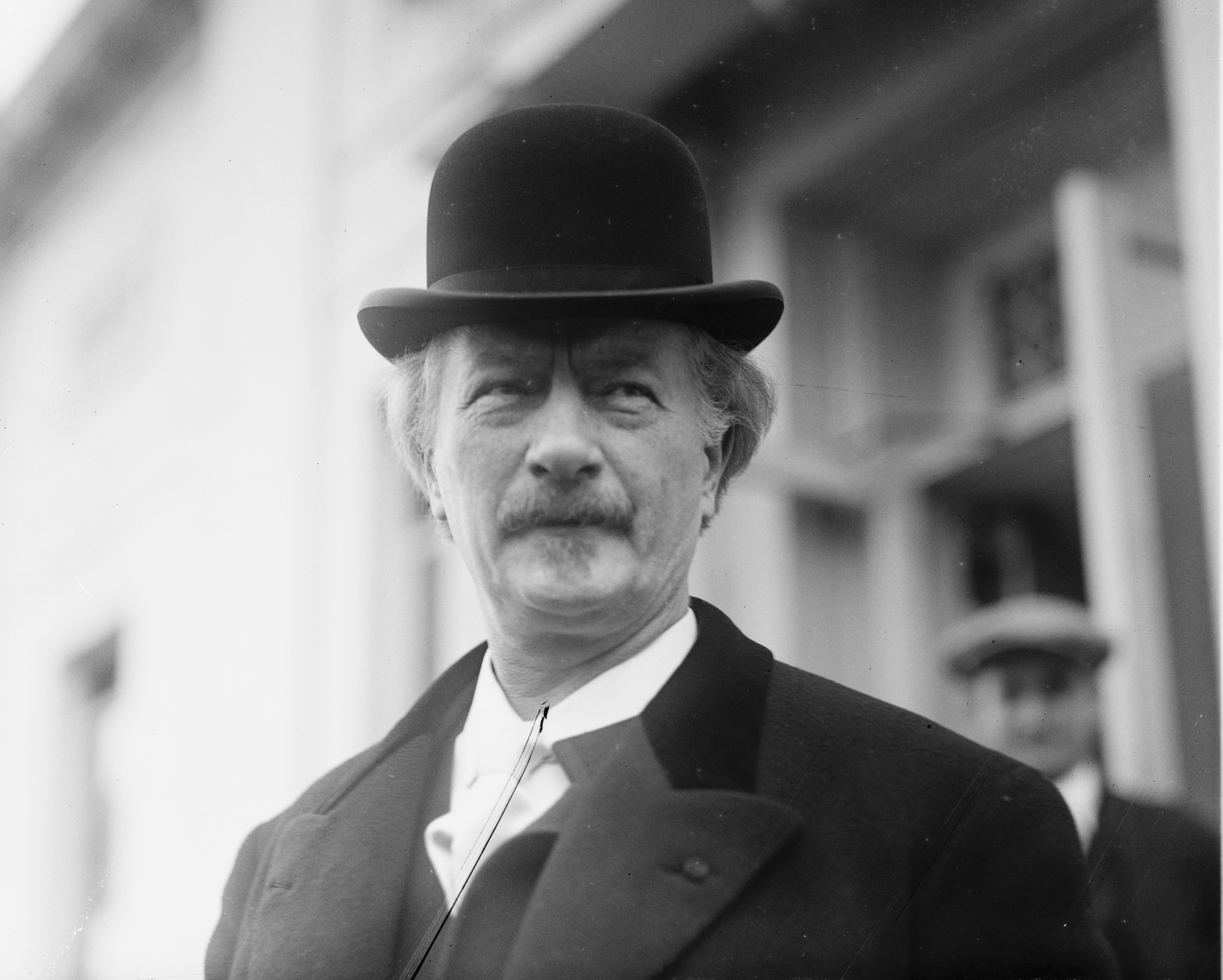
Ignacy Paderewski was a pianist and a statesman

Due to a series of German victories on the Eastern Front, the area of Congress Poland became occupied by the Central Powers of Germany and Austria; Warsaw was captured by the Germans on 5 August 1915. In the Act of 5th November 1916, a fresh incarnation of the Kingdom of Poland (Królestwo Regencyjne) was proclaimed by Germany and Austria on formerly Russian-controlled territories, within the German Mitteleuropa scheme. The sponsor states were never able to agree on a candidate to assume the throne, however; rather, it was governed in turn by German and Austrian governor-generals, a Provisional Council of State, and a Regency Council. This increasingly autonomous puppet state existed until November 1918, when it was replaced by the newly established Republic of Poland. The existence of this "kingdom" and its planned Polish army had a positive effect on the Polish national efforts on the Allied side, but in the Treaty of Brest-Litovsk of March 1918 the victorious in the east Germany imposed harsh conditions on defeated Russia and ignored Polish interests. Toward the end of the war, the German authorities engaged in massive, purposeful devastation of industrial and other economic potential of Polish lands in order to impoverish the country, a likely future competitor of Germany.

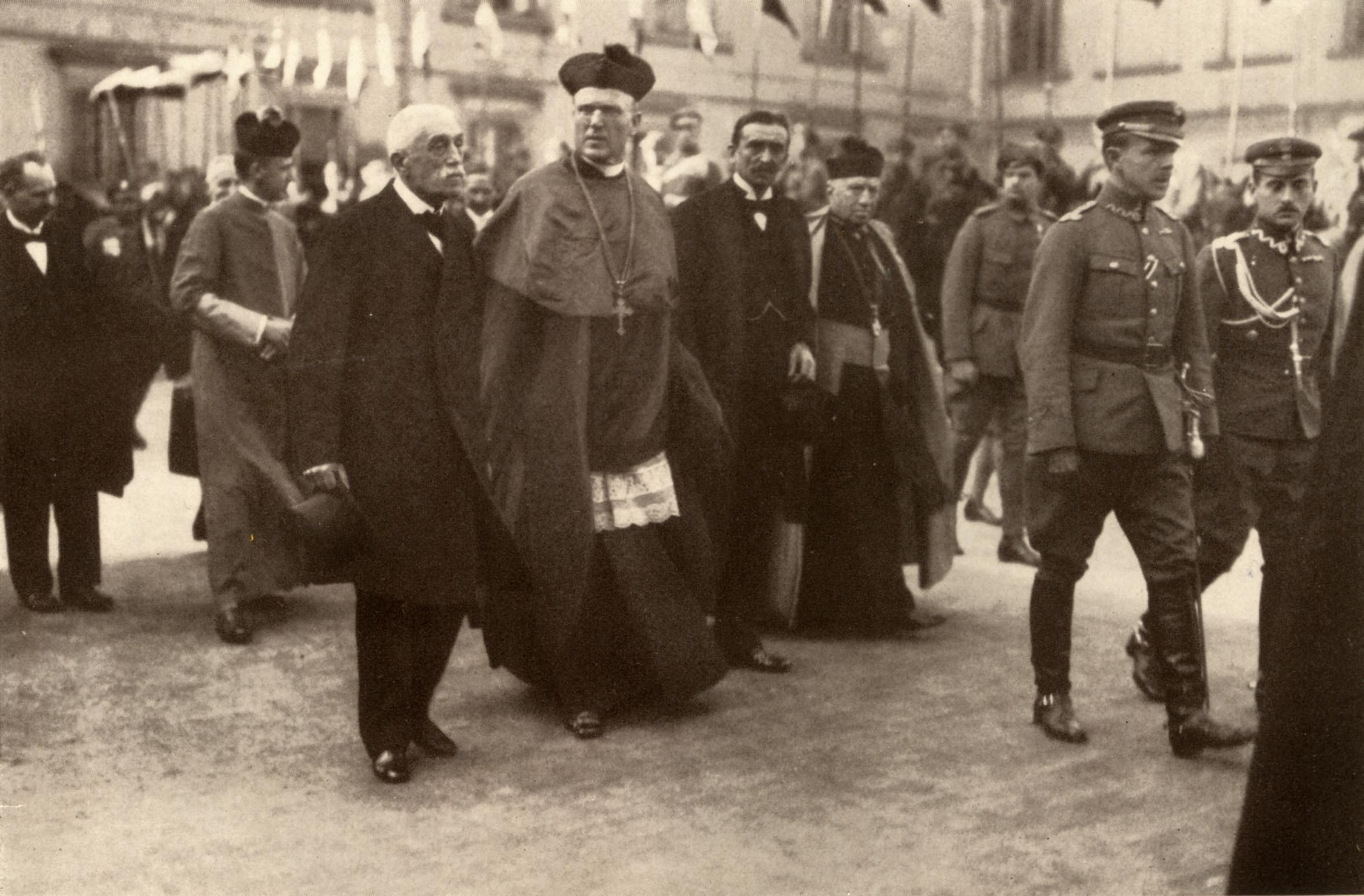
The Regency Council of the Kingdom of Poland in 1918. The "Kingdom" was established to entice Poles to cooperate with the Central Powers.

The independence of Poland had been campaigned for in Russia and in the West by Dmowski and in the West by Ignacy Jan Paderewski. Tsar Nicholas II of Russia, and then the leaders of the February Revolution and the October Revolution of 1917, installed governments who declared in turn their support for Polish independence.^{[d1]} In 1917, France formed the Blue Army (placed under Józef Haller) that comprised about 70,000 Poles by the end of the war, including men captured from German and Austrian units and 20,000 volunteers from the United States. There was also a 30,000-men strong Polish anti-German army in Russia. Dmowski, operating from Paris as head of the Polish National Committee (KNP), became the spokesman for Polish nationalism in the Allied camp. On the initiative of Woodrow Wilson's Fourteen Points, Polish independence was officially endorsed by the Allies in June 1918.^{[c1]}

In all, about two million Poles served in the war, counting both sides, and about 400–450,000 died. Much of the fighting on the Eastern Front took place in Poland, and civilian casualties and devastation were high.

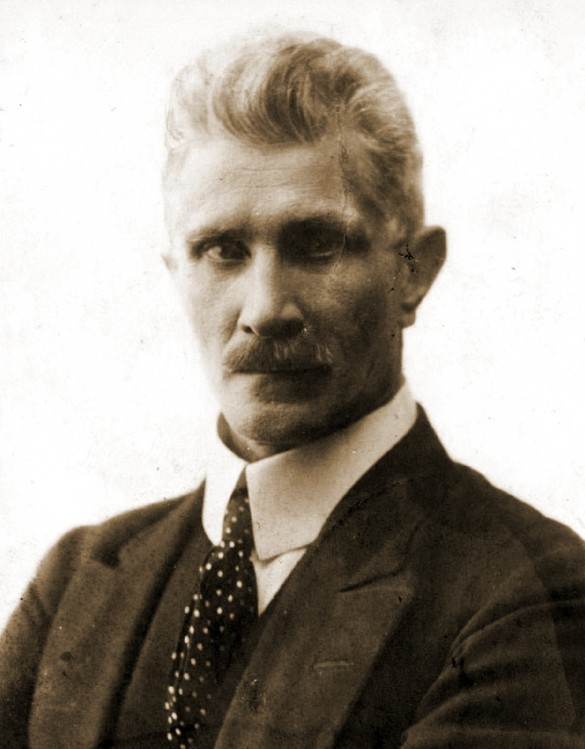
Ignacy Daszyński

The final push for independence of Poland took place on the ground in October–November 1918. Near the end of the war, Austro-Hungarian and German units were being disarmed, and the Austrian army's collapse freed Cieszyn and Kraków at the end of October. Lviv was then contested in the Polish–Ukrainian War of 1918–1919. Ignacy Daszyński headed the first short-lived independent Polish government in Lublin from 7 November, the leftist Provisional People's Government of the Republic of Poland, proclaimed as a democracy. Germany, now defeated, was forced by the Allies to stand down its large military forces in Poland. Overtaken by the German Revolution of 1918–1919 at home, the Germans released Piłsudski from prison. He arrived in Warsaw on 10 November and was granted extensive authority by the Regency Council; Piłsudski's authority was also recognized by the Lublin government.^{[b1]} On 22 November, he became the temporary head of state. Piłsudski was held by many in high regard, but was resented by the right-wing National Democrats. The emerging Polish state was internally divided, heavily war-damaged and economically dysfunctional.

== Second Polish Republic (1918–1939) ==
=== Securing national borders, war with Soviet Russia ===
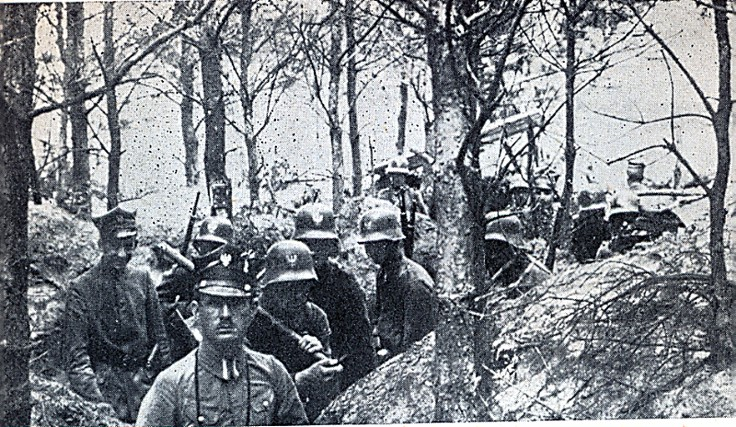
The Greater Poland Uprising, a war with Germany, erupted in December 1918

After more than a century of foreign rule, Poland regained its independence at the end of World War I as one of the outcomes of the negotiations that took place at the Paris Peace Conference of 1919. The Treaty of Versailles that emerged from the conference set up an independent Polish nation with an outlet to the sea, but left some of its boundaries to be decided by plebiscites. The largely German-inhabited Free City of Danzig was granted a separate status that guaranteed its use as a port by Poland. In the end, the settlement of the German-Polish border turned out to be a prolonged and convoluted process. The dispute helped engender the Greater Poland Uprising of 1918–1919, the three Silesian uprisings of 1919–1921, the East Prussian plebiscite of 1920, the Upper Silesia plebiscite of 1921 and the 1922 Silesian Convention in Geneva.

Other boundaries were settled by war and subsequent treaties. A total of six border wars were fought in 1918–1921, including the Polish–Czechoslovak border conflicts over Cieszyn Silesia in January 1919.

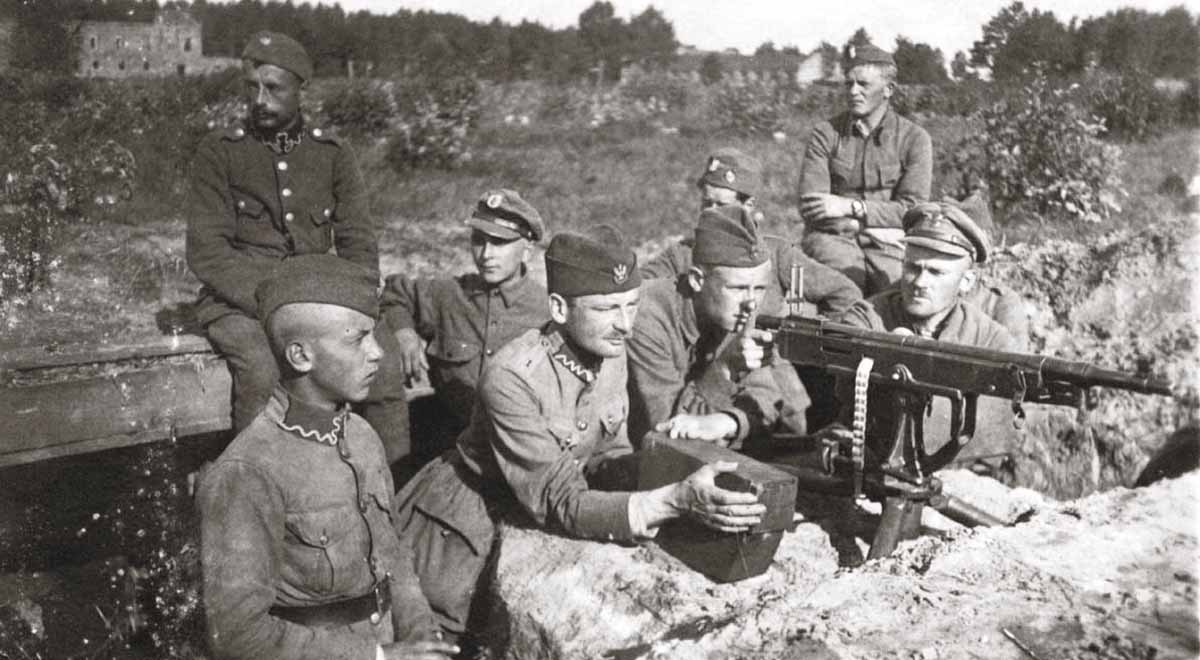
Polish–Soviet War, defenses near Warsaw, August 1920

As distressing as these border conflicts were, the Polish–Soviet War of 1919–1921 was the most important series of military actions of the era. Piłsudski had entertained far-reaching anti-Russian cooperative designs in Eastern Europe, and in 1919 the Polish forces pushed eastward into Lithuania, Belarus and Ukraine by taking advantage of the Russian preoccupation with a civil war, but they were soon confronted with the Soviet westward offensive of 1918–1919. Western Ukraine was already a theater of the Polish–Ukrainian War, which eliminated the proclaimed West Ukrainian People's Republic in July 1919. In the autumn of 1919, Piłsudski rejected urgent pleas from the former Entente powers to support Anton Denikin's White movement in its advance on Moscow. The Polish–Soviet War proper began with the Polish Kiev offensive in April 1920. Allied with the Directorate of Ukraine of the Ukrainian People's Republic, the Polish armies had advanced past Vilnius, Minsk and Kiev by June. At that time, a massive Soviet counter-offensive pushed the Poles out of most of Ukraine. On the northern front, the Soviet army reached the outskirts of Warsaw in early August. A Soviet triumph and the quick end of Poland seemed inevitable. However, the Poles scored a stunning victory at the Battle of Warsaw (1920). Afterwards, more Polish military successes followed, and the Soviets had to pull back. They left swathes of territory populated largely by Belarusians or Ukrainians to Polish rule. The new eastern boundary was finalized by the Peace of Riga in March 1921.

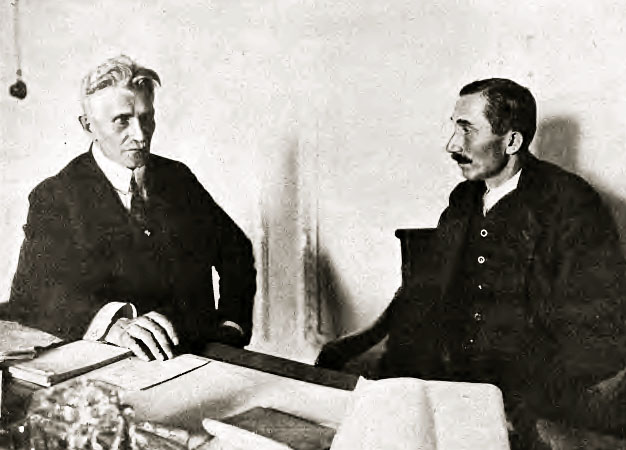
Wincenty Witos (right) and Ignacy Daszyński headed a wartime cabinet in 1920. Witos was an agrarian party leader and a centrist politician, later persecuted under the Sanation government.

The defeat of the Russian armies forced Vladimir Lenin and the Soviet leadership to postpone their strategic objective of linking up with the German and other European revolutionary leftist collaborators to spread communist revolution. Lenin also hoped for generating support for the Red Army in Poland, which failed to materialize.

Piłsudski's seizure of Vilnius in October 1920 (known as Żeligowski's Mutiny) was a nail in the coffin of the already poor Lithuania–Poland relations that had been strained by the Polish–Lithuanian War of 1919–1920; both states would remain hostile to one another for the remainder of the interwar period. Piłsudski's concept of Intermarium (an East European federation of states inspired by the tradition of the multiethnic Polish–Lithuanian Commonwealth that would include a hypothetical multinational successor state to the Grand Duchy of Lithuania) had the fatal flaw of being incompatible with his assumption of Polish domination, which would amount to an encroachment on the neighboring peoples' lands and aspirations. At the time of rising national movements, the plan thus ceased being a feature of Poland's politics.^{[a]} A larger federated structure was also opposed by Dmowski's National Democrats. Their representative at the Peace of Riga talks, Stanisław Grabski, opted for leaving Minsk, Berdychiv, Kamianets-Podilskyi and the surrounding areas on the Soviet side of the border. The National Democrats did not want to assume the lands they considered politically undesirable, as such territorial enlargement would result in a reduced proportion of citizens who were ethnically Polish.

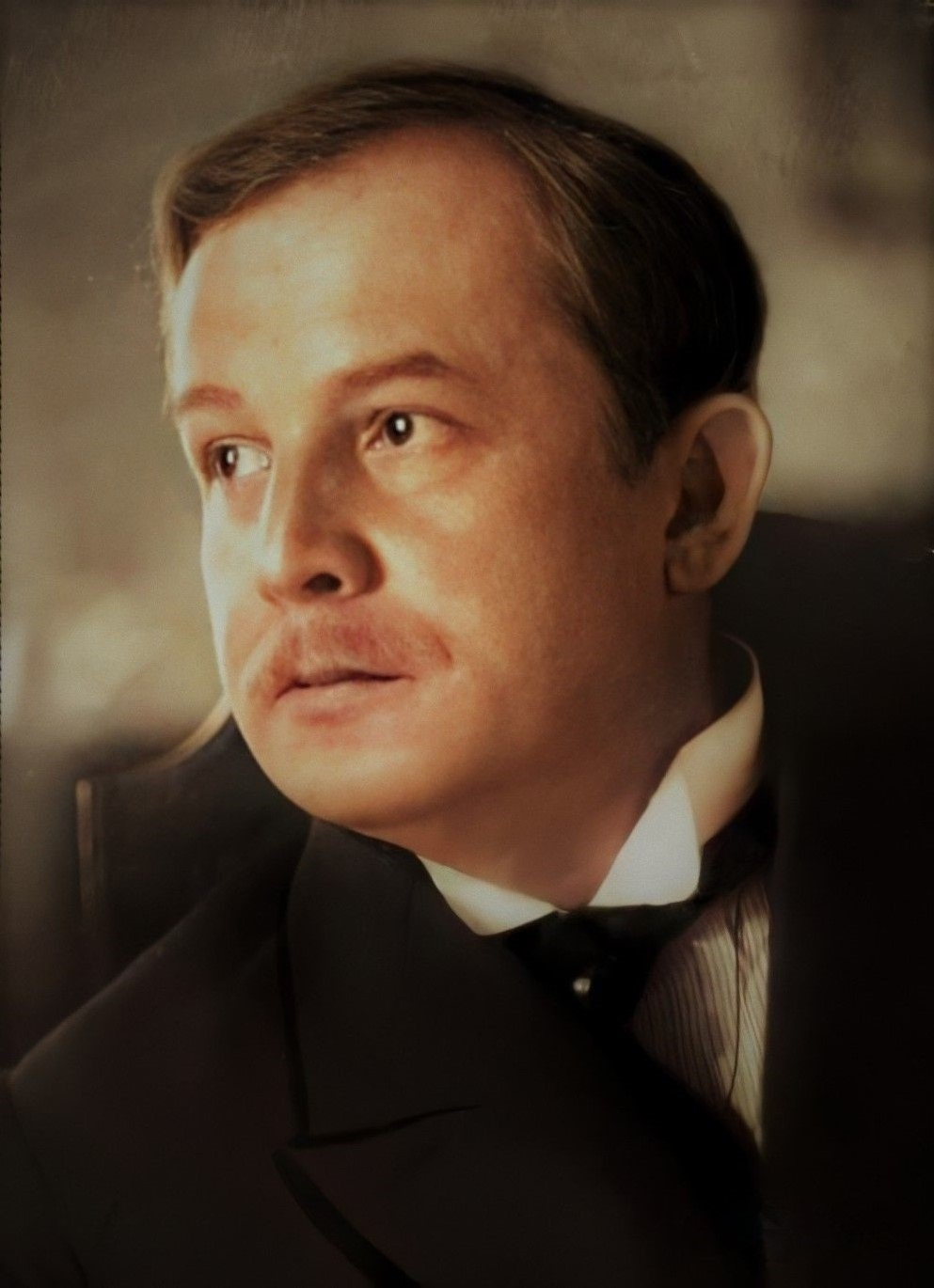
Wojciech Korfanty fought for a Polish Silesia and was the leader of the Polish Christian Democratic Party

The Peace of Riga settled the eastern border by preserving for Poland a substantial portion of the old Commonwealth's eastern territories at the cost of partitioning the lands of the former Grand Duchy of Lithuania (Lithuania and Belarus) and Ukraine. The Ukrainians ended up with no state of their own and felt betrayed by the Riga arrangements; their resentment gave rise to extreme nationalism and anti-Polish hostility. The Kresy (or borderland) territories in the east won by 1921 would form the basis for a swap arranged and carried out by the Soviets in 1943–1945, who at that time compensated the re-emerging Polish state for the eastern lands lost to the Soviet Union with conquered areas of eastern Germany.

The successful outcome of the Polish–Soviet War gave Poland a false sense of its prowess as a self-sufficient military power and encouraged the government to try to resolve international problems through imposed unilateral solutions. The territorial and ethnic policies of the interwar period contributed to bad relations with most of Poland's neighbors and uneasy cooperation with more distant centers of power, especially France and Great Britain.

=== Democratic politics (1918–1926) ===
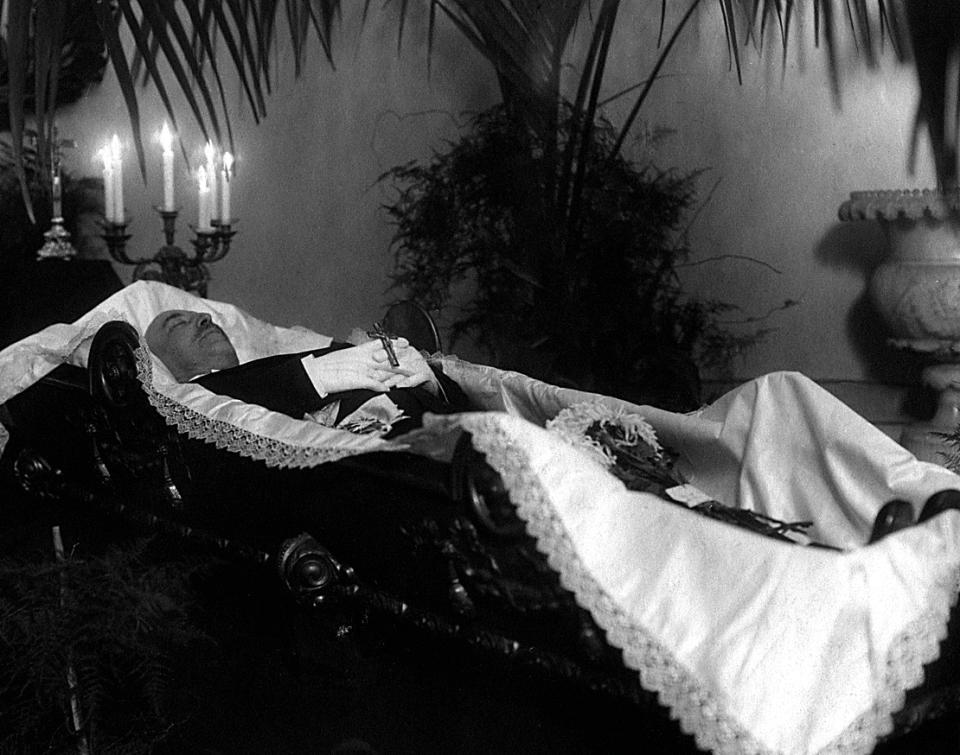
Bier of Gabriel Narutowicz, the first President of Poland, who was assassinated in 1922.

Among the chief difficulties faced by the government of the new Polish republic was the lack of an integrated infrastructure among the formerly separate partitions, a deficiency that disrupted industry, transportation, trade, and other areas.

The first Polish legislative election for the re-established Sejm (national parliament) took place in January 1919. A temporary Small Constitution was passed by the body the following month.

The rapidly growing population of Poland within its new boundaries was three-fourths agricultural and one-fourth urban; Polish was the primary language of only two thirds of the inhabitants of the new country. The minorities had very little voice in the government. The permanent March Constitution of Poland was adopted in March 1921. At the insistence of the National Democrats, who were concerned about how aggressively Józef Piłsudski might exercise presidential powers if he were elected to office, the constitution mandated limited prerogatives for the presidency.

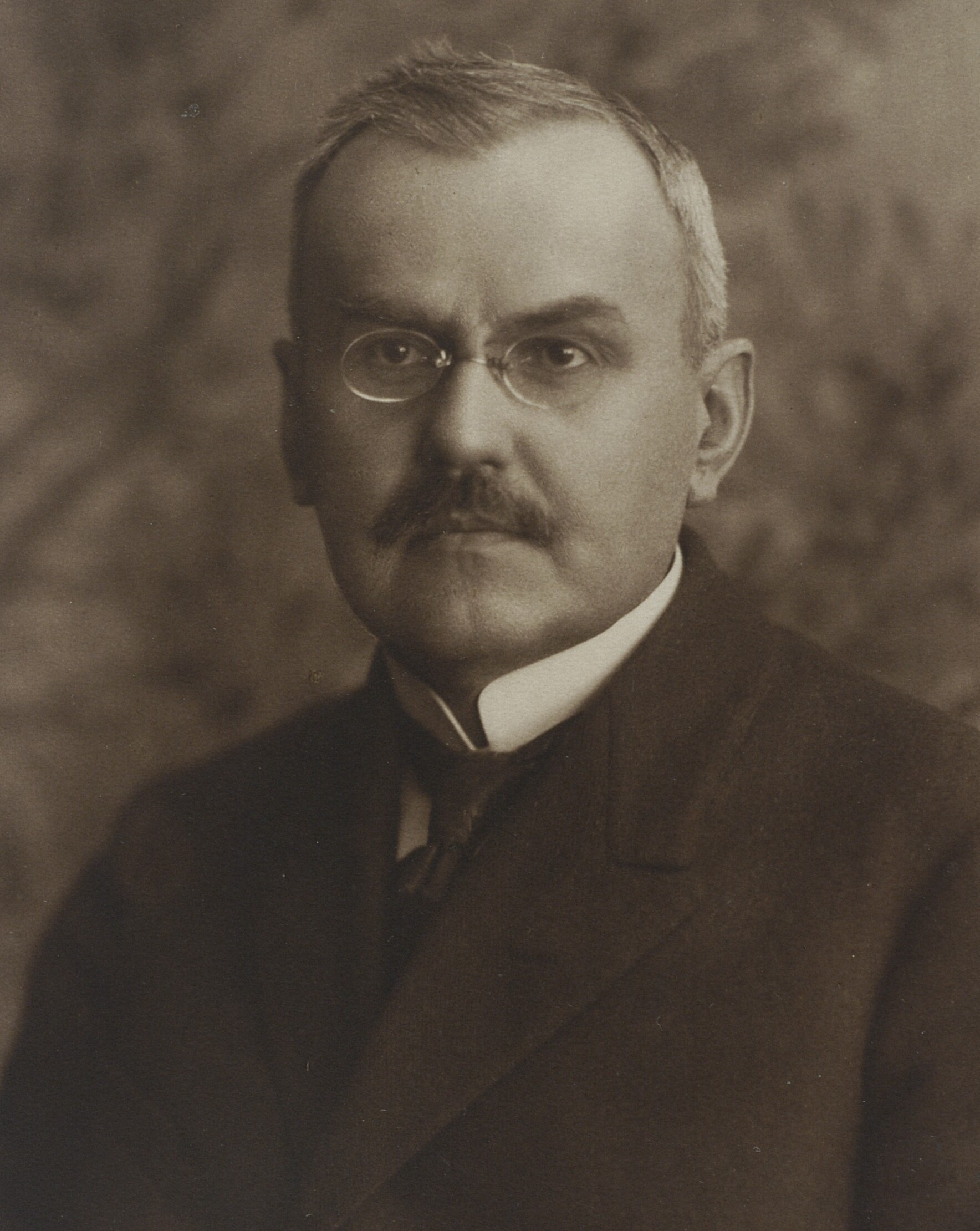
Władysław Grabski reformed the currency and introduced the Polish złoty to replace the mark.

The proclamation of the March Constitution was followed by a short and turbulent period of constitutional order and parliamentary democracy that lasted until 1926. The legislature remained fragmented, without stable majorities, and governments changed frequently. The open-minded Gabriel Narutowicz was elected president according to the Constitution by the National Assembly in 1922, without popular vote. However, members of the nationalist right-wing faction did not regard his elevation as legitimate. They viewed Narutowicz rather as a traitor whose election was pushed through by the votes of alien minorities. Narutowicz and his supporters were subjected to an intense harassment campaign, and the president was assassinated on 16 December 1922, after serving only five days in office.

Land reform measures were passed in 1919 and 1925 under pressure from an impoverished peasantry. They were partially implemented, but resulted in the parcellation of only 20% of the great agricultural estates. Poland endured numerous economic calamities and disruptions in the early 1920s, including waves of workers' strikes such as the 1923 Kraków riot. The German–Polish customs war, initiated by Germany in 1925, was one of the most damaging external factors that put a strain on Poland's economy. On the other hand, there were also signs of progress and stabilization, for example a critical reform of finances carried out by the competent government of Władysław Grabski, which lasted almost two years. Certain other achievements of the democratic period having to do with the management of governmental and civic institutions necessary to the functioning of the reunited state and nation were too easily overlooked. Lurking on the sidelines was a disgusted army officer corps unwilling to subject itself to civilian control, but ready to follow the retired Piłsudski, who was highly popular with Poles and just as dissatisfied with the Polish system of government as his former colleagues in the military.

=== Piłsudski's coup and the Sanation Era (1926–1935) ===
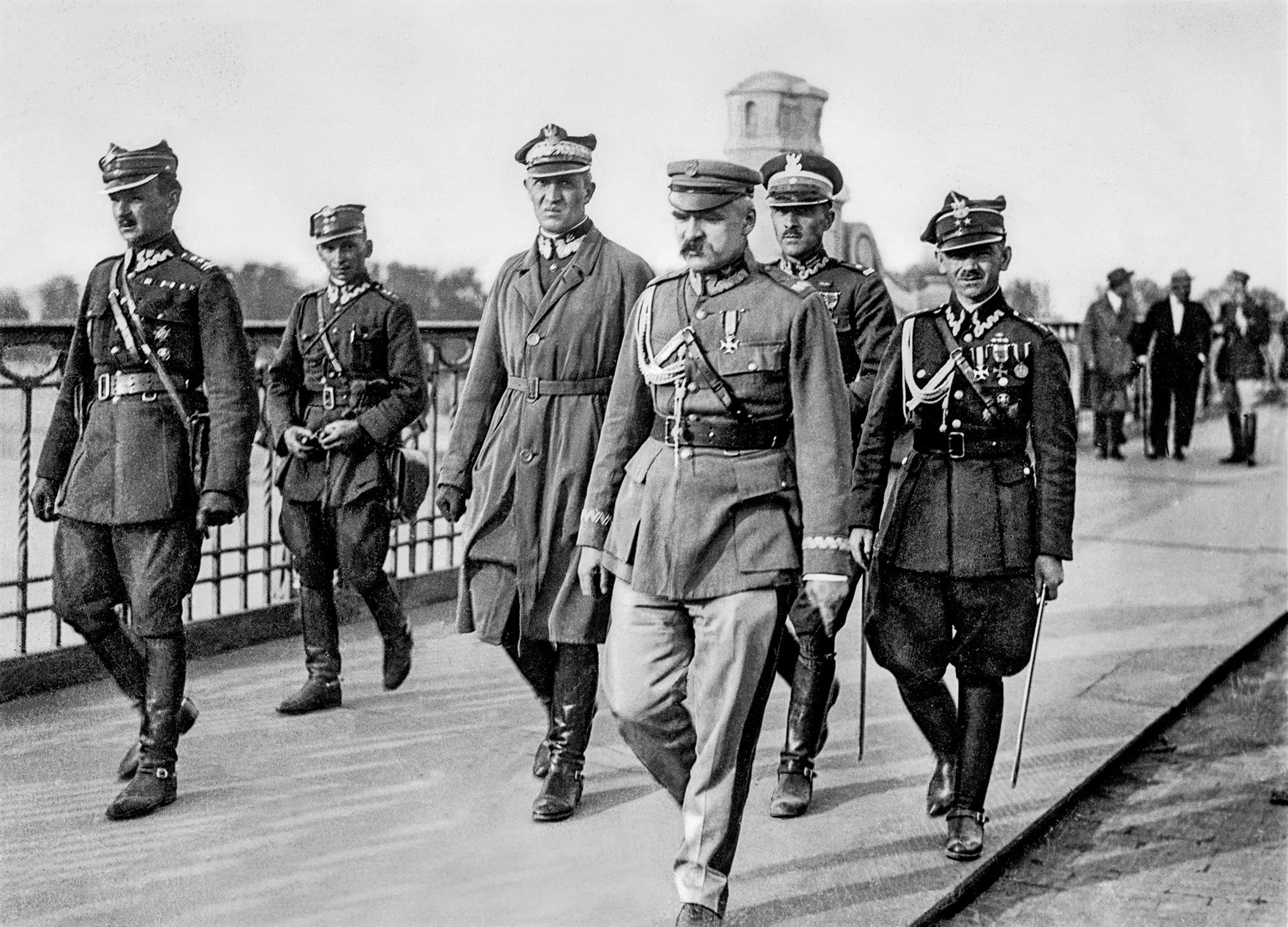
Piłsudski's May Coup of 1926 defined Poland's political reality in the years leading to World War II

On 12 May 1926, Piłsudski staged the May Coup, a military overthrow of the civilian government mounted against President Stanisław Wojciechowski and the troops loyal to the legitimate government. Hundreds died in fratricidal fighting. Piłsudski was supported by several leftist factions who ensured the success of his coup by blocking the railway transportation of government forces.^{[b1]} He also had the support of the conservative great landowners, a move that left the right-wing National Democrats as the only major social force opposed to the takeover.^{[l]}

Following the coup, the new government initially respected many parliamentary formalities, but gradually tightened its control and abandoned pretenses. The Centrolew, a coalition of center-left parties, was formed in 1929, and in 1930 called for the "abolition of dictatorship". In 1930, the Sejm was dissolved and a number of opposition deputies were imprisoned at the Brest Fortress. Five thousand political opponents were arrested ahead of the Polish legislative election of 1930, which was rigged to award a majority of seats to the pro-government Nonpartisan Bloc for Cooperation with the Government (BBWR).

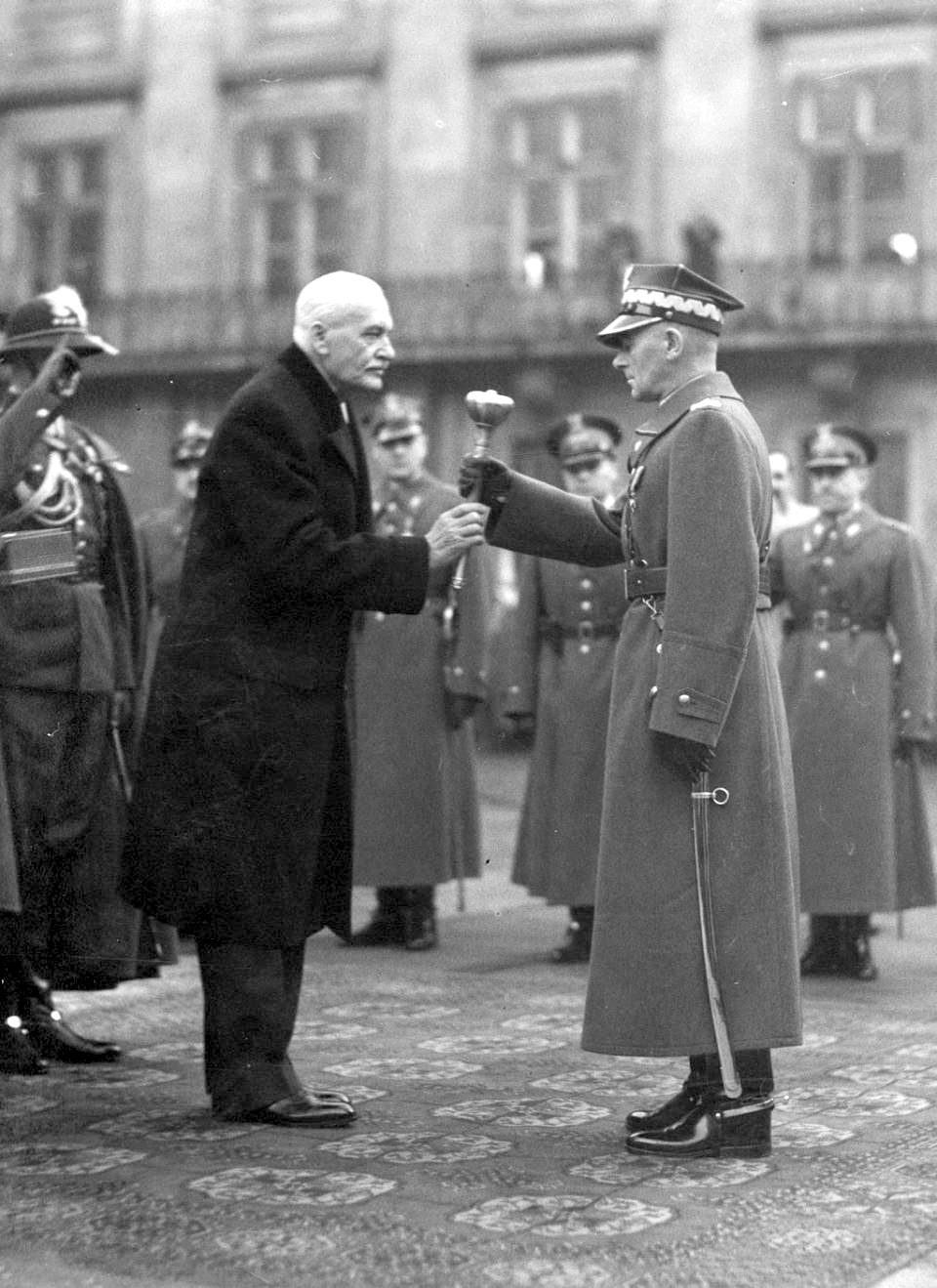
President Ignacy Mościcki and Marshal Edward Rydz-Śmigły were among top leaders of Sanation Poland

The authoritarian Sanation government ("sanation" meant to denote "healing") that Piłsudski led until his death in 1935 (and would remain in place until 1939) reflected the dictator's evolution from his center-left past to conservative alliances. Political institutions and parties were allowed to function, but the electoral process was manipulated and those not willing to cooperate submissively were subjected to repression. From 1930, persistent opponents of the government, many of the leftist persuasion, were imprisoned and subjected to staged legal processes with harsh sentences, such as the Brest trials, or else detained in the Bereza Kartuska prison and similar camps for political prisoners. About three thousand were detained without trial at different times at the Bereza internment camp between 1934 and 1939. In 1936 for example, 369 activists were taken there, including 342 Polish communists. Rebellious peasants staged riots in 1932, 1933 and the 1937 peasant strike in Poland. Other civil disturbances were caused by striking industrial workers (e.g. events of the "Bloody Spring" of 1936), nationalist Ukrainians^{[p]} and the activists of the incipient Belarusian movement. All became targets of ruthless police-military pacification.^{[y]} Besides sponsoring political repression, the government fostered Józef Piłsudski's cult of personality that had already existed long before he assumed dictatorial powers.

Piłsudski signed the Soviet–Polish Non-Aggression Pact in 1932 and the German–Polish declaration of non-aggression in 1934, but in 1933 he insisted that there was no threat from the East or West and said that Poland's politics were focused on becoming fully independent without serving foreign interests. He initiated the policy of maintaining an equal distance and an adjustable middle course regarding the two great neighbors, later continued by Józef Beck. Piłsudski kept personal control of the army, but it was poorly equipped, poorly trained and had poor preparations in place for possible future conflicts. His only war plan was a defensive war against a Soviet invasion.^{[r]} The slow modernization after Piłsudski's death fell far behind the progress made by Poland's neighbors and measures to protect the western border, discontinued by Piłsudski from 1926, were not undertaken until March 1939.

Sanation deputies in the Sejm used a parliamentary maneuver to abolish the democratic March Constitution and push through a more authoritarian April Constitution in 1935; it reduced the powers of the Sejm, which Piłsudski despised. The process and the resulting document were seen as illegitimate by the anti-Sanation opposition, but during World War II, the Polish government-in-exile recognized the April Constitution in order to uphold the legal continuity of the Polish state. Between 1932 and 1933 Piłsudski and Beck initiated several incidents along the borders with Germany and Danzig, both to test whether Western powers would protect the Versailles arrangements (on which Polish security depended), and as preparation for a preventative war against Germany. At the same time they sent emissaries to London and Paris, looking for their support in stopping Germany's rearmament effort. An invasion to Danzig by Poland was scheduled for April 21, 1933, but the amassing of troops was discovered and the invasion was postponed. At the time an invasion by Poland would have posed a serious military threat to Germany, but with the British rejecting the idea (in favor of the Four-Power Pact), and with wavering support from the French, the Poles had eventually reneged on the idea of invasion. Between 1933 and 1934 Germany would increase its armament expenditures by 68%, and by January 1934 the two powers would sign a ten-year non-aggression pact. When Marshal Piłsudski died in 1935, he retained the support of dominant sections of Polish society even though he never risked testing his popularity in an honest election. His government was dictatorial, but at that time only Czechoslovakia remained democratic in all of the regions neighboring Poland. Historians have taken widely divergent views of the meaning and consequences of the coup Piłsudski perpetrated and his personal rule that followed.

=== Social and economic trends of the interwar period ===
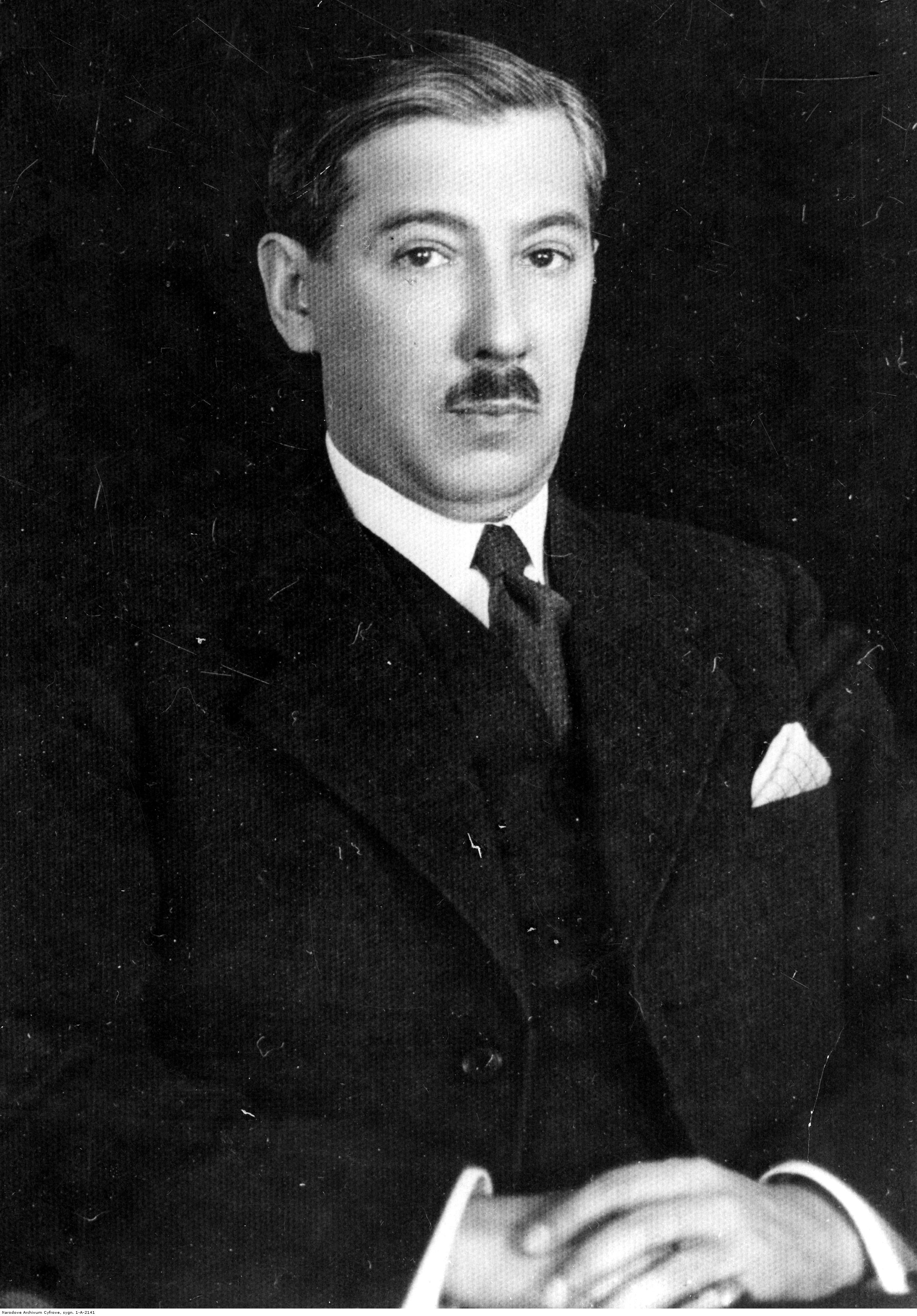
Eugeniusz Kwiatkowski promoted Poland's Central Industrial Region

Independence stimulated the development of Polish culture in the Interbellum and intellectual achievement was high. Warsaw, whose population almost doubled between World War I and World War II, was a restless, burgeoning metropolis. It outpaced Kraków, Lwów and Wilno, the other major population centers of the country. Mainstream Polish society was not affected by the repressions of the Sanation authorities overall; many Poles enjoyed relative stability, and the economy improved markedly between 1926 and 1929, only to become caught up in the global Great Depression. After 1929, the country's industrial production and gross national income slumped by about 50%.

The Great Depression brought low prices for farmers and unemployment for workers. Social tensions increased, including rising antisemitism. A major economic transformation and multi-year state plan to achieve national industrial development, as embodied in the Central Industrial Region initiative launched in 1936, was led by Minister Eugeniusz Kwiatkowski. Motivated primarily by the need for a native arms industry, the initiative was in progress at the time of the outbreak of World War II. Kwiatkowski was also the main architect of the earlier Gdynia seaport project.

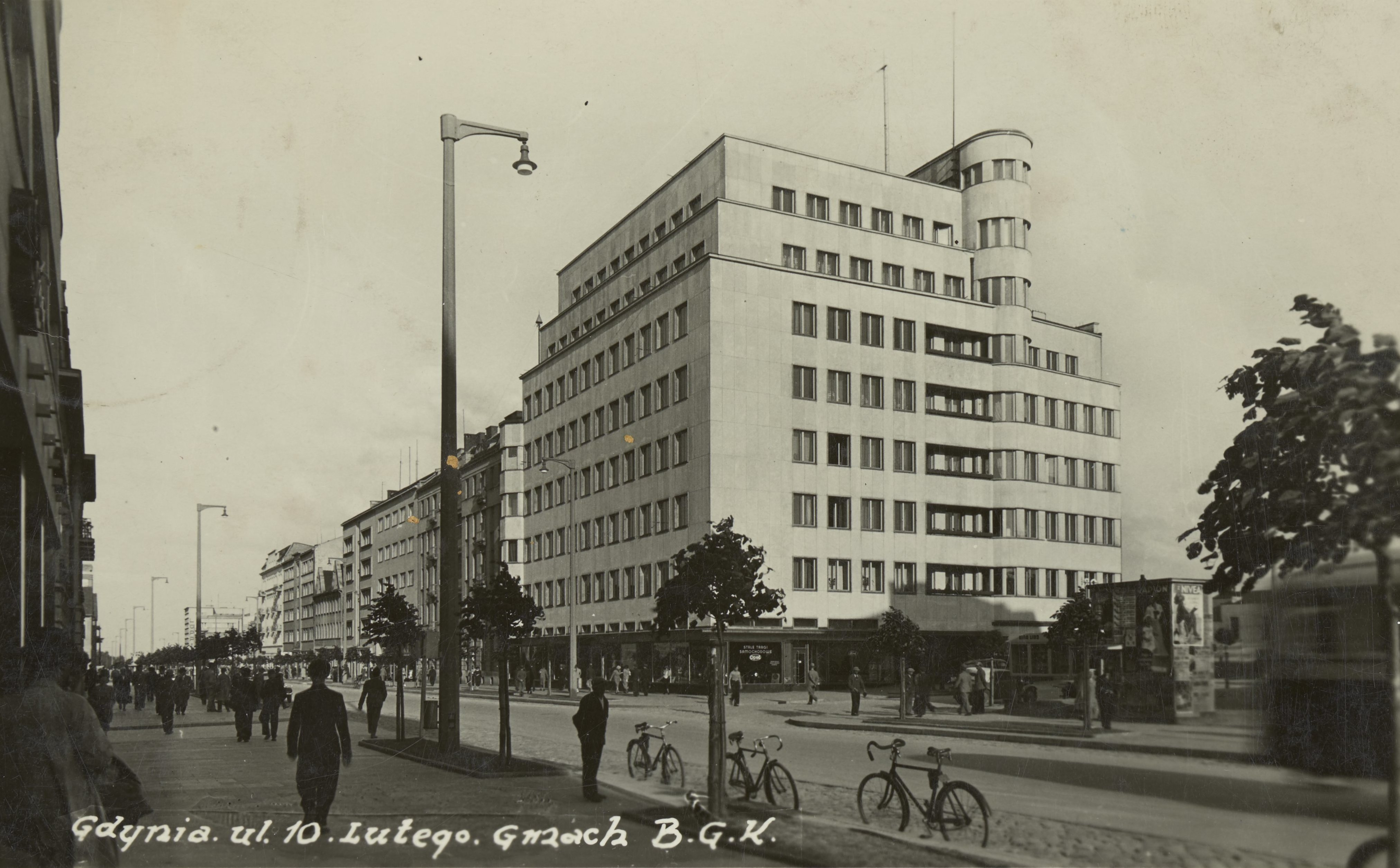
Gdynia was a newly built city in the Polish Corridor and acted as a major seaport project on the Baltic Sea. Its Modernist Center is an important architectural landmark.

The prevalent in political circles nationalism was fueled by the large size of Poland's minority populations and their separate agendas. According to the language criterion of the Polish census of 1931, the Poles constituted 69% of the population, Ukrainians 15%, Jews (defined as speakers of the Yiddish language) 8.5%, Belarusians 4.7%, Germans 2.2%, Lithuanians 0.25%, Russians 0.25% and Czechs 0.09%, with some geographical areas dominated by a particular minority. In time, the ethnic conflicts intensified, and the Polish state grew less tolerant of the interests of its national minorities. In interwar Poland, compulsory free general education substantially reduced illiteracy rates, but discrimination was practiced in a way that resulted in a dramatic decrease in the number of Ukrainian language schools and official restrictions on Jewish attendance at selected schools in the late 1930s.

The population grew steadily, reaching 35 million in 1939. However, the overall economic situation in the interwar period was one of stagnation. There was little money for investment inside Poland, and few foreigners were interested in investing there. Total industrial production barely increased between 1913 and 1939 (within the area delimited by the 1939 borders), but because of population growth (from 26.3 million in 1919 to 34.8 million in 1939), the per capita output actually decreased by 18%.

Conditions in the predominant agricultural sector kept deteriorating between 1929 and 1939, which resulted in rural unrest and a progressive radicalization of the Polish peasant movement that became increasingly inclined toward militant anti-state activities. It was firmly repressed by the authorities. According to Norman Davies, the failures of the Sanation government (combined with the objective economic realities) caused a radicalization of the Polish masses by the end of the 1930s, but he warns against drawing parallels with the incomparably more oppressive Nazi Germany or the Stalinist Soviet Union.

=== Final Sanation years (1935–1939) ===
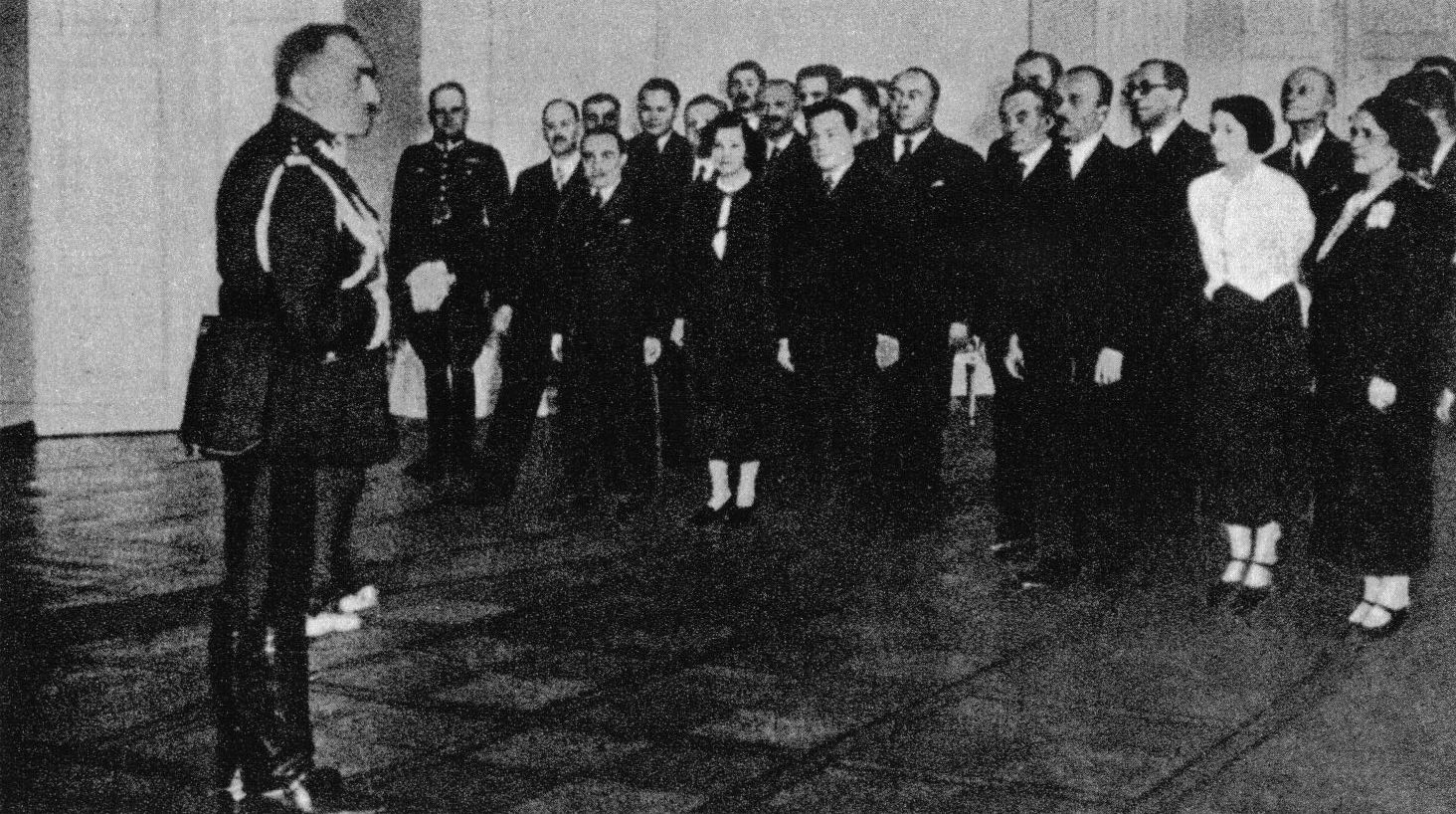
A year after Piłsudski's death, his former personal assistant General Felicjan Sławoj Składkowski became the Second Polish Republic's last prime minister

After Piłsudski's death in 1935, Poland was governed until (and initially during) the German invasion of 1939 by old allies and subordinates known as "Piłsudski's colonels". They had neither the vision nor the resources to cope with the perilous situation facing Poland in the late 1930s. The colonels had gradually assumed greater powers during Piłsudski's life by manipulating the ailing marshal behind the scenes. Eventually they achieved an overt politicization of the army that did nothing to help prepare the country for war.

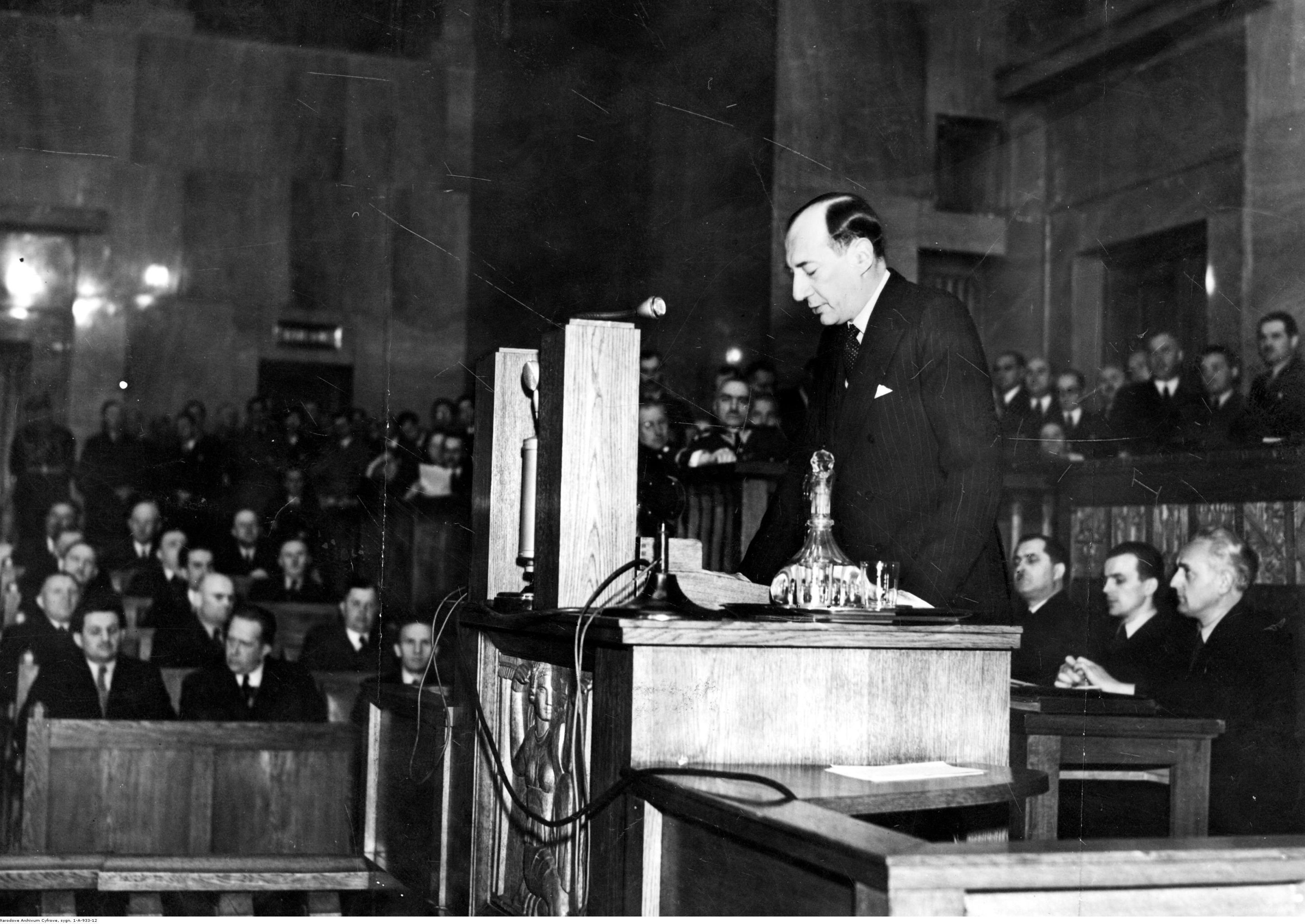
Foreign Minister Józef Beck rejected the proposed risky alliances with Nazi Germany and with the Soviet Union

Foreign policy was the responsibility of Józef Beck, under whom Polish diplomacy attempted balanced approaches toward Germany and the Soviet Union, without success, on the basis of a flawed understanding of the European geopolitics of his day. Beck had numerous foreign policy schemes and harbored illusions of Poland's status as a great power. He alienated most of Poland's neighbors, but is not blamed by historians for the ultimate failure of relations with Germany. The principal events of his tenure were concentrated in its last two years. In the case of the 1938 Polish ultimatum to Lithuania, the Polish action nearly resulted in a German takeover of southwest Lithuania, the Klaipėda Region (Memel Territory), which had a largely German population. Also in 1938, the Polish government opportunistically undertook a hostile action against the Czechoslovak state as weakened by the Munich Agreement and annexed a small piece of territory on its borders. In this case, Beck's understanding of the consequences of the Polish military move turned out to be completely mistaken, because in the end the German occupation of Czechoslovakia markedly weakened Poland's own position. Furthermore, Beck erroneously believed that Nazi-Soviet ideological contradictions would preclude their cooperation.

At home, increasingly alienated and suppressed minorities threatened unrest and violence. Extreme nationalist circles such as the National Radical Camp grew more outspoken. One of the groups, the Camp of National Unity, combined many nationalists with Sanation supporters and was connected to the new strongman, Marshal Edward Rydz-Śmigły, whose faction of the Sanation ruling movement was increasingly nationalistic.

In the late 1930s, the exile bloc Front Morges united several major Polish anti-Sanation figures, including Ignacy Paderewski, Władysław Sikorski, Wincenty Witos, Wojciech Korfanty and Józef Haller. It gained little influence inside Poland, but its spirit soon reappeared during World War II, within the Polish government-in-exile.

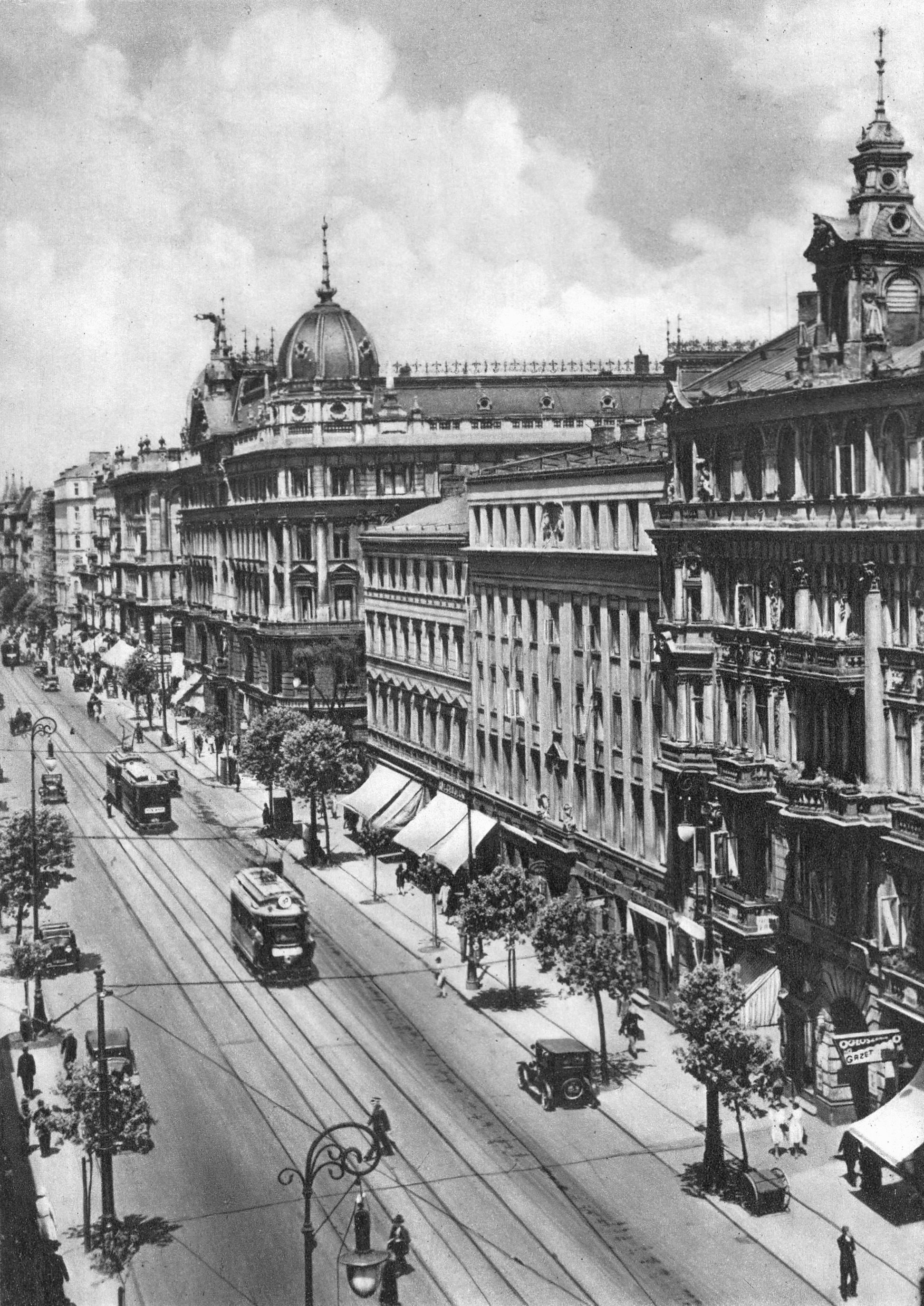
Warsaw was one of Europe's chief cities before the Second World War, pictured in 1939

In October 1938, Joachim von Ribbentrop first proposed German-Polish territorial adjustments and Poland's participation in the Anti-Comintern Pact against the Soviet Union. The status of the Free City of Danzig was one of the key bones of contention. Approached by Ribbentrop again in March 1939, the Polish government expressed willingness to address issues causing German concern, but effectively rejected Germany's stated demands and thus refused to allow Poland to be turned by Adolf Hitler into a German puppet state. Hitler, incensed by the British and French declarations of support for Poland, abrogated the German–Polish declaration of non-aggression in late April 1939.

To protect itself from an increasingly aggressive Nazi Germany, already responsible for the annexations of Austria (in the Anschluss of 1938), Czechoslovakia (in 1939) and a part of Lithuania after the 1939 German ultimatum to Lithuania, Poland entered into a military alliance with Britain and France (the 1939 Anglo-Polish military alliance and the Franco-Polish alliance (1921), as updated in 1939). However, the two Western powers were defense-oriented and not in a strong position, either geographically or in terms of resources, to assist Poland. Attempts were therefore made by them to induce Soviet-Polish cooperation, which they viewed as the only militarily viable arrangement.

Diplomatic manoeuvers continued in the spring and summer of 1939, but in their final attempts, the Franco-British talks with the Soviets in Moscow on forming an anti-Nazi defensive military alliance failed. Warsaw's refusal to allow the Red Army to operate on Polish territory doomed the Western efforts. The final contentious Allied-Soviet exchanges took place on 21 and 23 August 1939.^{[b]} The Stalinist state was the target of an intense German counter-initiative and was concurrently involved in increasingly effective negotiations with Hitler's agents. On 23 August, an outcome contrary to the exertions of the Allies became a reality: in Moscow, Germany and the Soviet Union hurriedly signed the Molotov–Ribbentrop Pact, which secretly provided for the dismemberment of Poland into Nazi- and Soviet-controlled zones.

== World War II (1939–1945) ==
=== Invasions and resistance ===
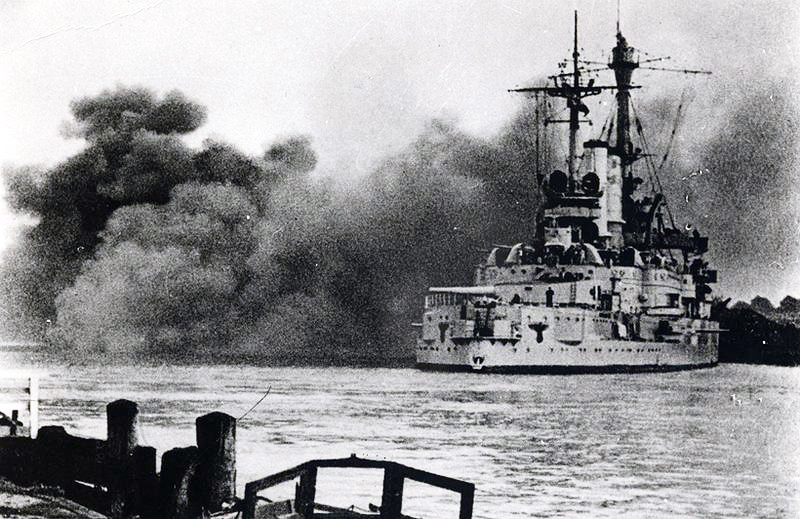
German battleship Schleswig-Holstein shells Westerplatte, 1 September 1939

On 1 September 1939, Hitler ordered an invasion of Poland, the opening event of World War II. Poland had signed an Anglo-Polish military alliance as recently as the 25th of August, and had long been in alliance with France. The two Western powers soon declared war on Germany, but they remained largely inactive (the period early in the conflict became known as the Phoney War) and extended no aid to the attacked country. The technically and numerically superior Wehrmacht formations rapidly advanced eastwards and engaged massively in the murder of Polish civilians over the entire occupied territory. On 17 September, a Soviet invasion of Poland began. The Soviet Union quickly occupied most of the areas of eastern Poland that were inhabited by a significant Ukrainian and Belarusian minority.^{[h]} The two invading powers divided up the country as they had agreed in the secret provisions of the Molotov–Ribbentrop Pact. Poland's top government officials and military high command fled the war zone and arrived at the Romanian Bridgehead in mid-September. After the Soviet entry they sought refuge in Romania.

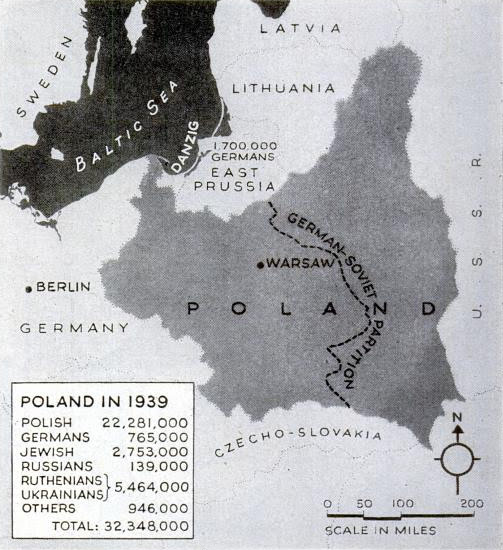
Map of Poland following the German and Soviet invasions (1939)

Among the military operations in which Poles held out the longest (until late September or early October) were the Siege of Warsaw, the Battle of Hel and the resistance of the Independent Operational Group Polesie. Warsaw fell on 27 September after a heavy German bombardment that killed tens of thousands civilians and soldiers. Poland was ultimately partitioned between Germany and the Soviet Union according to the terms of the German–Soviet Frontier Treaty signed by the two powers in Moscow on 29 September.

Gerhard Weinberg has argued that the most significant Polish contribution to World War II was sharing its code-breaking results. This allowed the British to perform the cryptanalysis of the Enigma and decipher the main German military code, which gave the Allies a major advantage in the conflict. As regards actual military campaigns, some Polish historians have argued that simply resisting the initial invasion of Poland was the country's greatest contribution to the victory over Nazi Germany, despite its defeat. The Polish Army of nearly one million men significantly delayed the start of the Battle of France, planned by the Germans for 1939. When the Nazi offensive in the West did happen, the delay caused it to be less effective, a possibly crucial factor in the victory of the Battle of Britain.

After Germany invaded the Soviet Union as part of its Operation Barbarossa in June 1941, the whole of pre-war Poland was overrun and occupied by German troops.

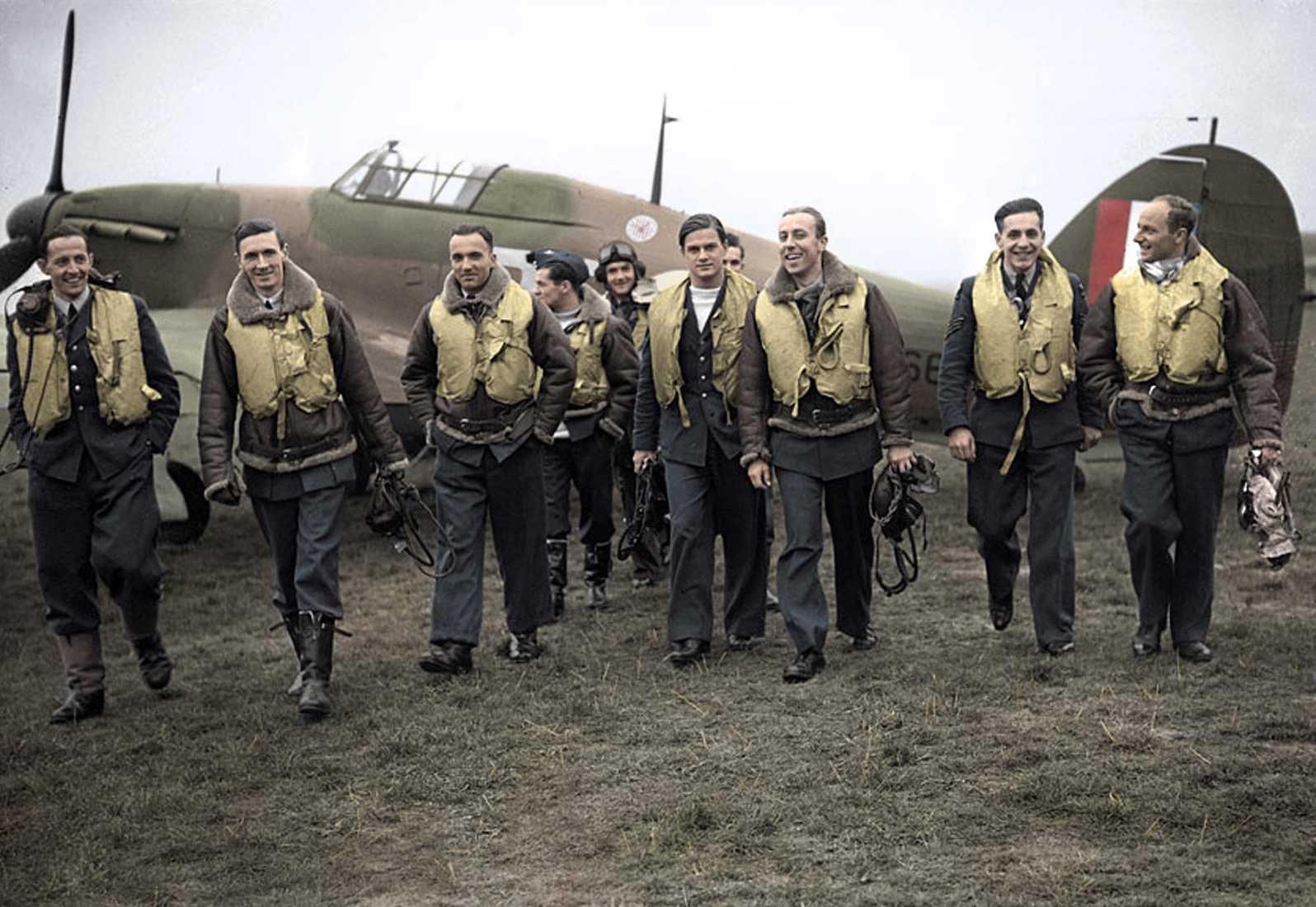
Pilots of No. 303 Polish Fighter Squadron won fame in the Battle of Britain

German-occupied Poland was divided from 1939 into two regions: Polish areas annexed by Nazi Germany directly into the German Reich and areas ruled under a so-called General Government of occupation. The Poles formed an underground resistance movement and a Polish government-in-exile that operated first in Paris, then, from July 1940, in London. Polish-Soviet diplomatic relations, broken since September 1939, were resumed in July 1941 under the Sikorski–Mayski agreement, which facilitated the formation of a Polish army (the Anders' Army) in the Soviet Union. In November 1941, Prime Minister Sikorski flew to the Soviet Union to negotiate with Stalin on its role on the Soviet-German front, but the British wanted the Polish soldiers in the Middle East. Stalin agreed, and the army was evacuated there.^{[w]}

The organizations forming the Polish Underground State that functioned in Poland throughout the war were loyal to and formally under the Polish government-in-exile, acting through its Government Delegation for Poland. During World War II, hundreds of thousands of Poles joined the underground Polish Home Army (Armia Krajowa), a part of the Polish Armed Forces of the government-in-exile. About 200,000 Poles fought on the Western Front in the Polish Armed Forces in the West loyal to the government-in-exile, and about 300,000 in the Polish Armed Forces in the East under the Soviet command on the Eastern Front. The pro-Soviet resistance movement in Poland, led by the Polish Workers' Party, was active from 1941. It was opposed by the gradually forming extreme nationalistic National Armed Forces.^{[t]}

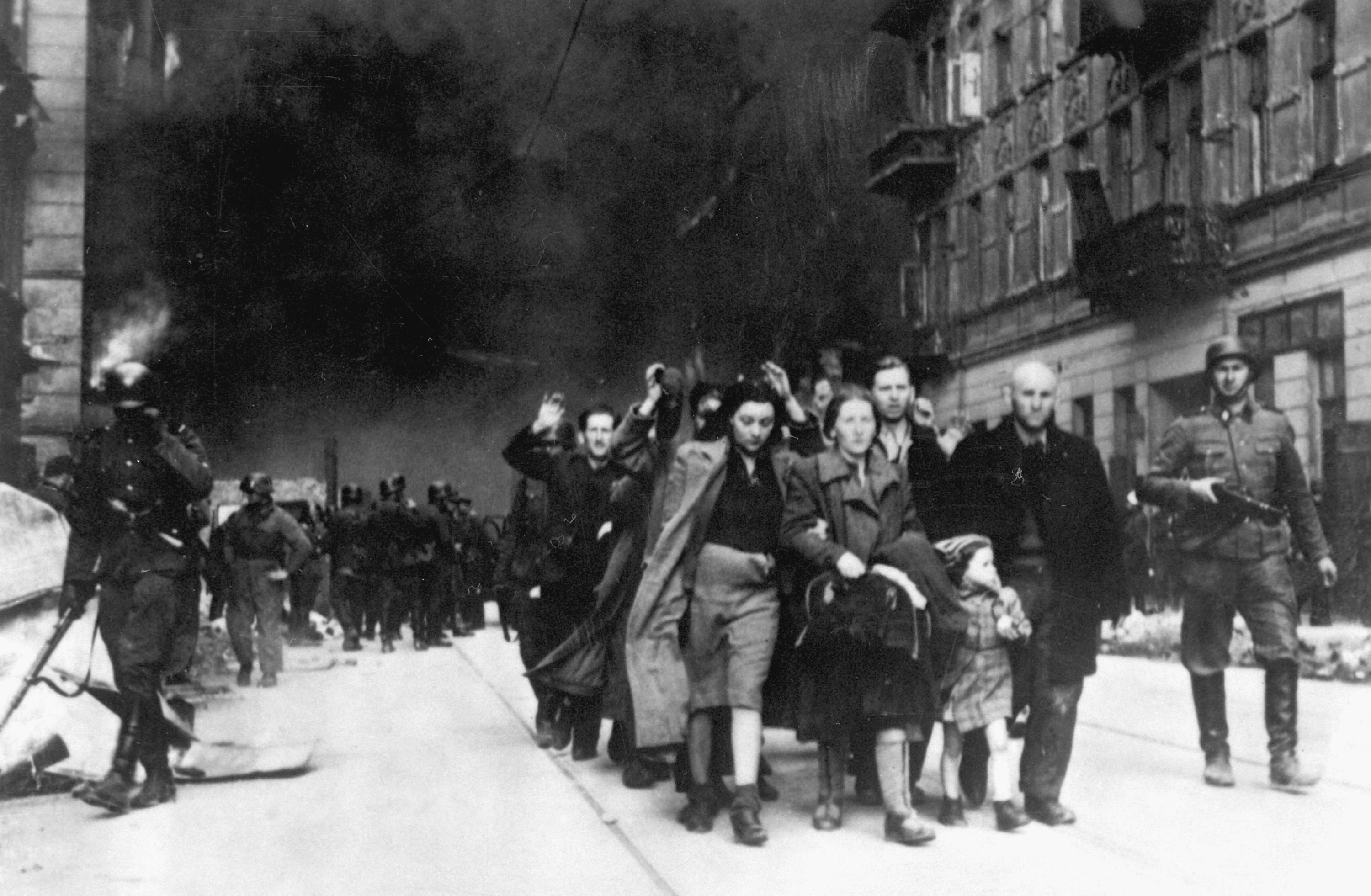
Warsaw Ghetto Uprising

Beginning in late 1939, hundreds of thousands of Poles from the Soviet-occupied areas were deported and taken east. Of the upper-ranking military personnel and others deemed uncooperative or potentially harmful by the Soviets, about 22,000 were secretly executed by them at the Katyn massacre. In April 1943, the Soviet Union broke off deteriorating relations with the Polish government-in-exile after the German military announced the discovery of mass graves containing murdered Polish army officers. The Soviets claimed that the Poles committed a hostile act by requesting that the Red Cross investigate these reports.

From 1941, the implementation of the Nazi Final Solution began, and the Holocaust in Poland proceeded with force. Warsaw was the scene of the Warsaw Ghetto Uprising in April–May 1943, triggered by the liquidation of the Warsaw Ghetto by German SS units. The elimination of Jewish ghettos in German-occupied Poland took place in many cities. As the Jewish people were being removed to be exterminated, uprisings were waged against impossible odds by the Jewish Combat Organization and other desperate Jewish insurgents.

=== Soviet advance 1944–1945, Warsaw Uprising ===
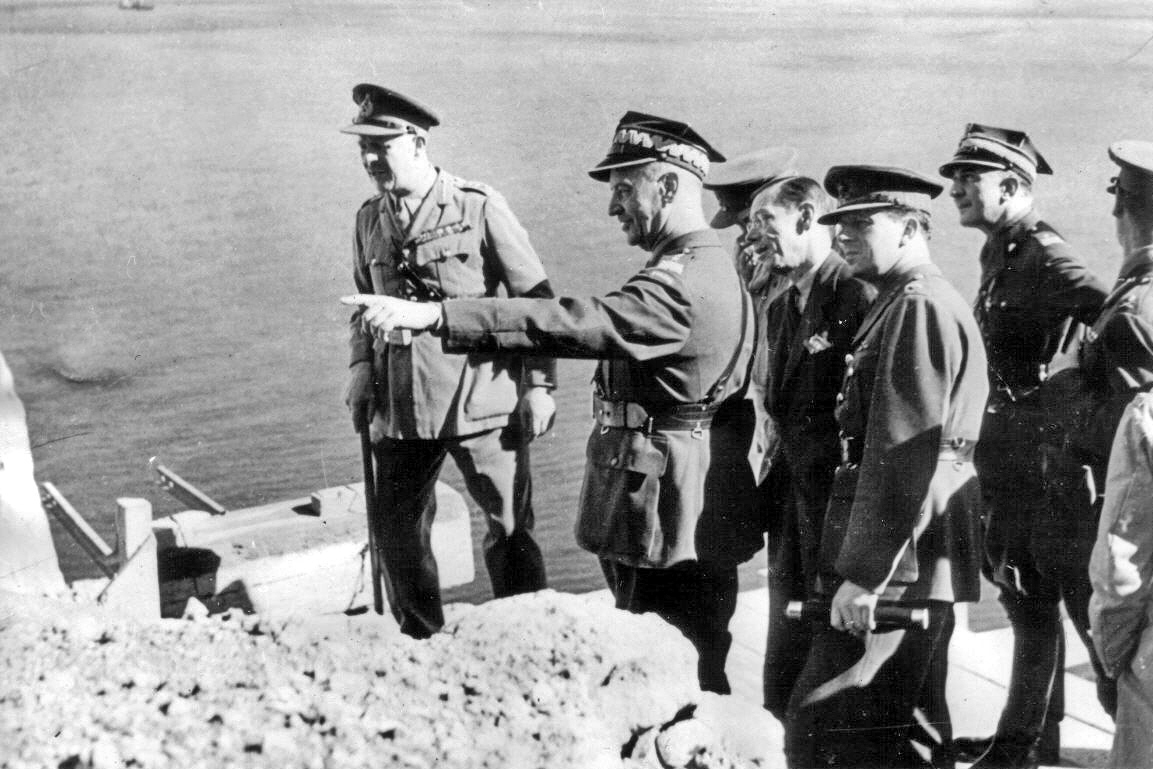
Gen. Władysław Sikorski, prime minister of the Polish government-in-exile and commander-in-chief of Polish armed forces, shortly before his death in 1943

At a time of increasing cooperation between the Western Allies and the Soviet Union in the wake of the Nazi invasion of 1941, the influence of the Polish government-in-exile was seriously diminished by the death of Prime Minister Władysław Sikorski, its most capable leader, in a plane crash on 4 July 1943. Around that time, Polish-communist civilian and military organizations opposed to the government, led by Wanda Wasilewska and supported by Stalin, were formed in the Soviet Union.

In July 1944, the Soviet Red Army and Soviet-controlled Polish People's Army entered the territory of future postwar Poland. In protracted fighting in 1944 and 1945, the Soviets and their Polish allies defeated and expelled the German army from Poland at a cost of over 600,000 Soviet soldiers lost.

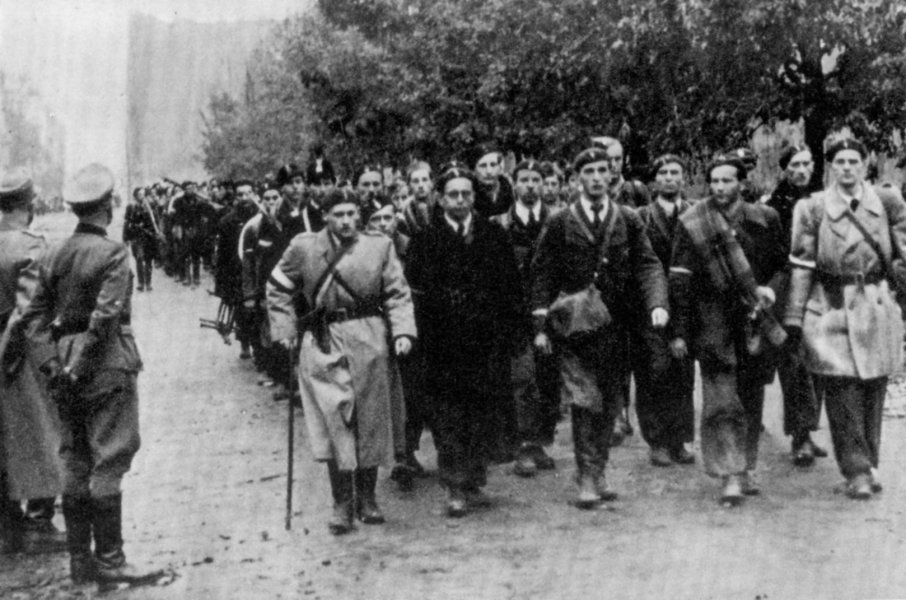
Surrender of the Warsaw Uprising

The greatest single undertaking of the Polish resistance movement in World War II and a major political event was the Warsaw Uprising that began on 1 August 1944. The uprising, in which most of the city's population participated, was instigated by the underground Home Army and approved by the Polish government-in-exile in an attempt to establish a non-communist Polish administration ahead of the arrival of the Red Army. The uprising was originally planned as a short-lived armed demonstration in expectation that the Soviet forces approaching Warsaw would assist in any battle to take the city. The Soviets had never agreed to an intervention, however, and they halted their advance at the Vistula River. The Germans used the opportunity to carry out a brutal suppression of the forces of the pro-Western Polish underground.^{[m]}

The bitterly fought uprising lasted for two months and resulted in the death or expulsion from the city of hundreds of thousands of civilians. After the defeated Poles surrendered on 2 October, the Germans carried out a planned destruction of Warsaw on Hitler's orders that obliterated the remaining infrastructure of the city. The Polish First Army, fighting alongside the Soviet Red Army, entered a devastated Warsaw on 17 January 1945.^{[n]}

=== Allied conferences, Polish governments ===
From the time of the Tehran Conference in late 1943, there was broad agreement among the three Great Powers (the United States, the United Kingdom, and the Soviet Union) that the locations of the borders between Germany and Poland and between Poland and the Soviet Union would be fundamentally changed after the conclusion of World War II. Stalin's view that Poland should be moved far to the west was accepted by Polish communists, whose organizations included the Polish Workers' Party and the Union of Polish Patriots. The communist-led State National Council, a quasi-parliamentary body, was in existence in Warsaw from the beginning of 1944. In July 1944, a communist-controlled Polish Committee of National Liberation was established in Lublin, to nominally govern the areas liberated from German control. The move prompted protests from Prime Minister Stanisław Mikołajczyk and his Polish government-in-exile.

By the time of the Yalta Conference in February 1945, the communists had already established a Provisional Government of the Republic of Poland. The Soviet position at the conference was strong because of their decisive contribution to the war effort and as a result of their occupation of immense amounts of land in central and eastern Europe. The Great Powers gave assurances that the communist provisional government would be converted into an entity that would include democratic forces from within the country and active abroad, but the London-based government-in-exile was not mentioned. A Provisional Government of National Unity and subsequent democratic elections were the agreed stated goals. The disappointing results of these plans and the failure of the Western powers to ensure a strong participation of non-communists in the immediate post-war Polish government were seen by many Poles as a manifestation of Western betrayal.

=== War losses, extermination of Jews and Poles ===
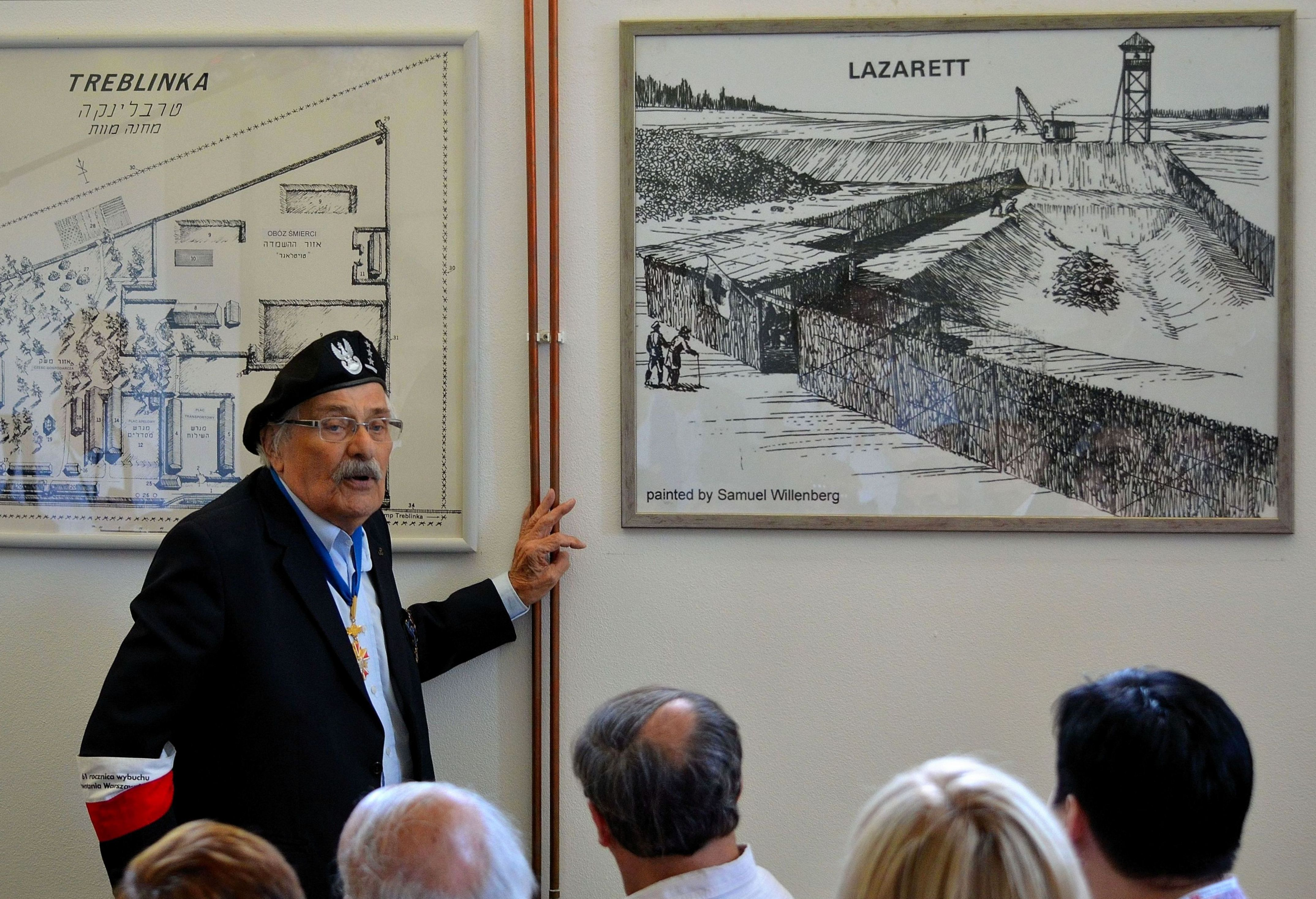
Samuel Willenberg showing his drawings of the Treblinka extermination camp

A lack of accurate data makes it difficult to document numerically the extent of the human losses suffered by Polish citizens during World War II. Additionally, many assertions made in the past must be considered suspect due to flawed methodology and a desire to promote certain political agendas. The last available enumeration of ethnic Poles and the large ethnic minorities is the Polish census of 1931. Exact population figures for 1939 are therefore not known.

According to the United States Holocaust Memorial Museum, at least 3 million Polish Jews and at least 1.9 million non-Jewish Polish civilians were killed. According to the historians Brzoza and Sowa, about 2 million ethnic Poles were killed, but it is not known, even approximately, how many Polish citizens of other ethnicities perished, including Ukrainians, Belarusians, and Germans. Millions of Polish citizens were deported to Germany for forced labor or to German extermination camps such as Treblinka, Auschwitz and Sobibór. Nazi Germany intended to exterminate the Jews completely, in actions that have come to be described collectively as the Holocaust. The Poles were to be expelled from areas controlled by Nazi Germany through a process of resettlement that started in 1939. Such Nazi operations matured into a plan known as the Generalplan Ost that amounted to displacement, enslavement and partial extermination of the Slavic people and was expected to be completed within 15 years.

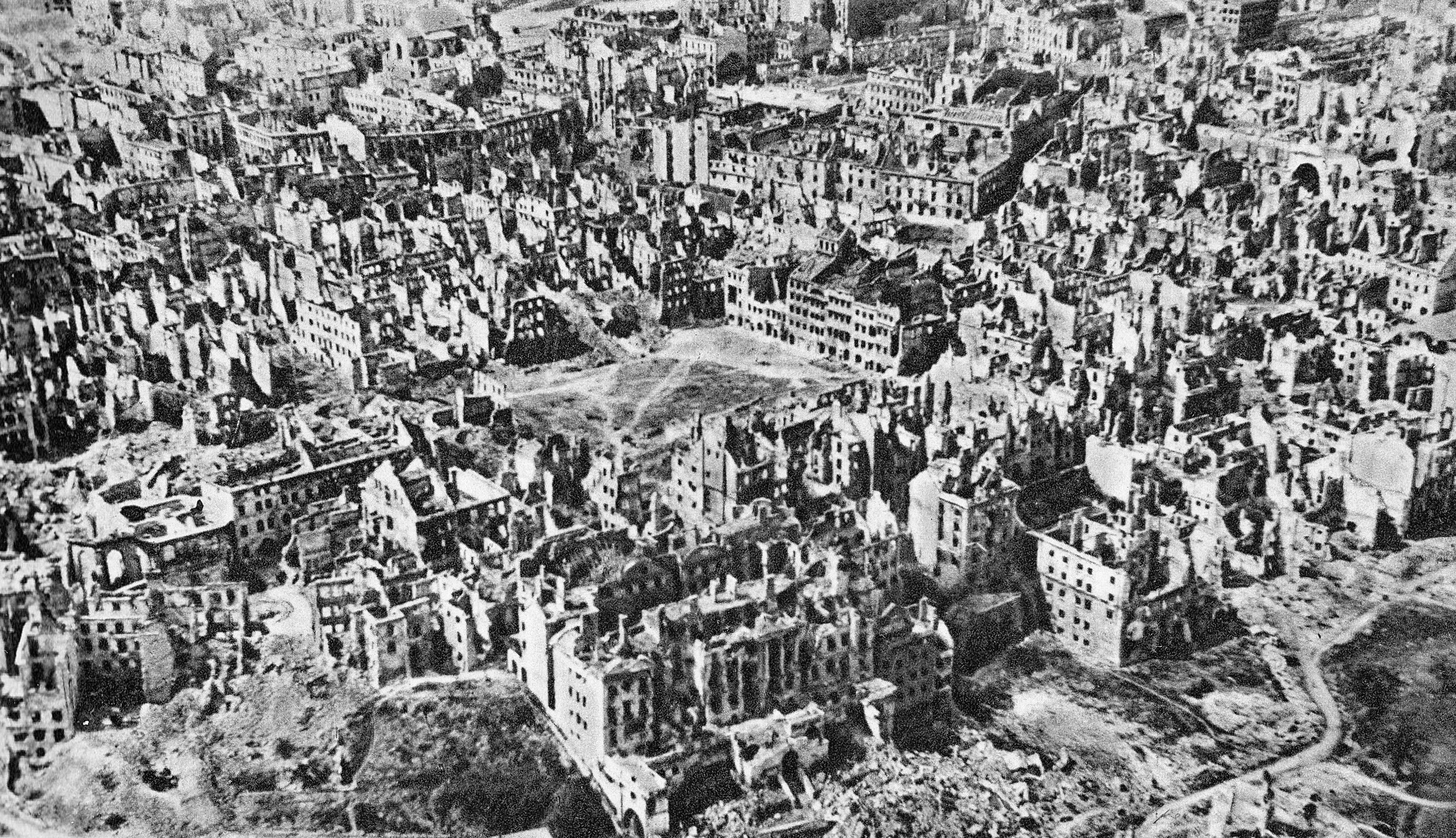
Warsaw destroyed, photo taken January 1945

The majority of Poles remained indifferent to the Jewish plight, and neither assisted nor persecuted Jews. Of those who have helped rescue, shelter and protect Jews from the Nazi atrocity, Yad Vashem and the State of Israel have recognized 6,992 individuals as Righteous Among the Nations.

In an attempt to incapacitate Polish society, the Nazis and the Soviets executed tens of thousands of members of the intelligentsia and community leadership during events such as the German AB-Aktion in Poland, Operation Tannenberg and the Katyn massacre.^{[j]} Over 95% of the Jewish losses and 90% of the ethnic Polish losses were caused directly by Nazi Germany,^{[d]} whereas 5% of the ethnic Polish losses were caused by the Soviets and 5% by Ukrainian nationalists. The large-scale Jewish presence in Poland that had endured for centuries was rather quickly put to an end by the policies of extermination implemented by the Nazis during the war. Waves of displacement and emigration that took place both during and after the war removed from Poland a majority of the Jews who survived. Further significant Jewish emigration followed events such as the Polish October political thaw of 1956 and the 1968 Polish political crisis.

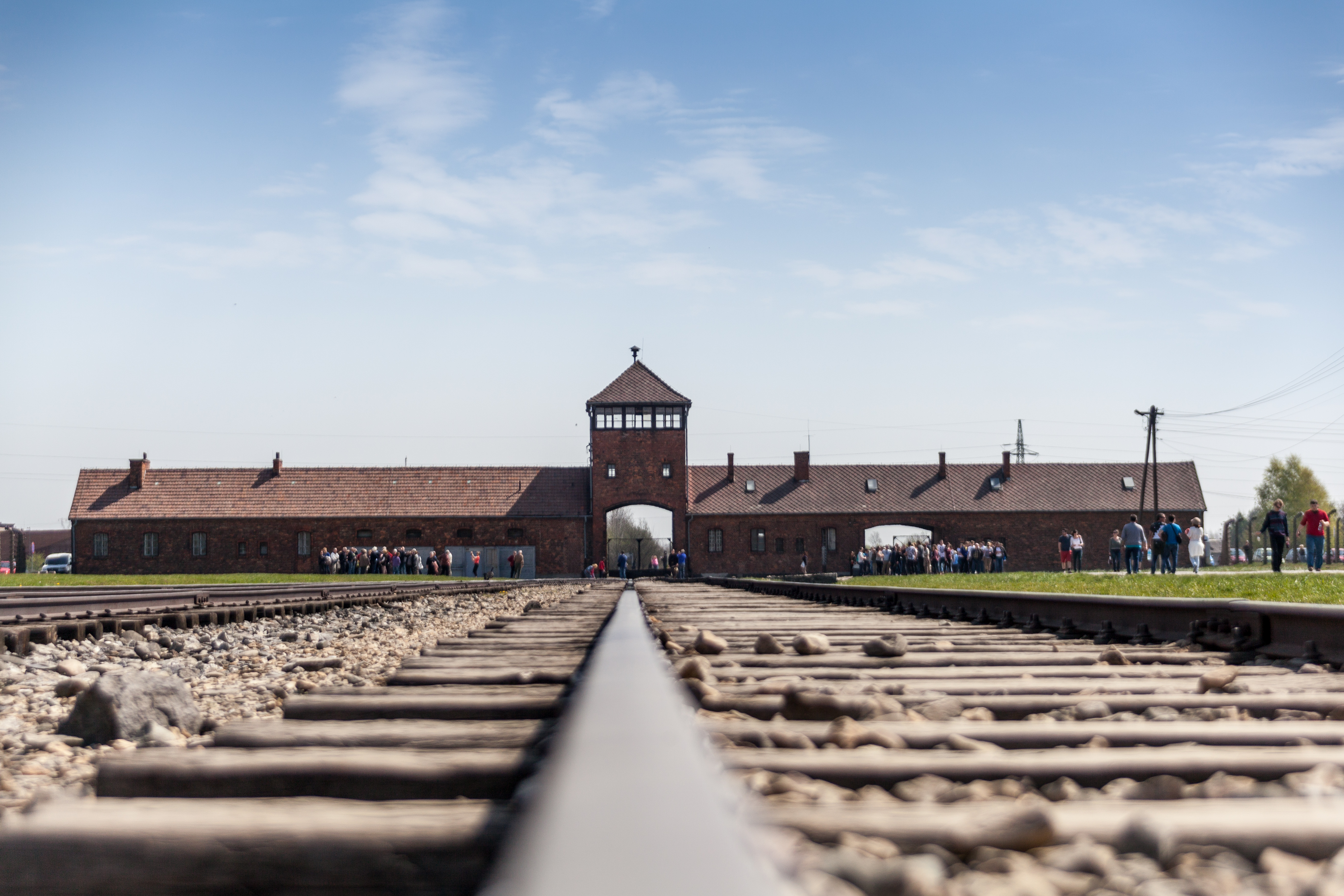
The infamous gatehouse at Auschwitz-Birkenau concentration camp, where at least 1.1 million people were murdered by Nazi Germany

In 1940–1941, some 325,000 Polish citizens were deported by the Soviet Union. The number of Polish citizens who died at the hands of the Soviets is estimated at less than 100,000.

In 1943–1944, Ukrainian nationalists associated with the Organization of Ukrainian Nationalists (OUN) and the Ukrainian Insurgent Army perpetrated the Massacres of Poles in Volhynia and Eastern Galicia. Estimates of the number of Polish civilian victims vary greatly, from tens to hundreds of thousands.

Approximately 90% of Poland's war casualties were the victims of prisons, death camps, raids, executions, the annihilation of ghettos, epidemics, starvation, excessive work and ill treatment. The war left one million children orphaned and 590,000 persons disabled. The country lost 38% of its national assets (whereas Britain lost only 0.8%, and France only 1.5%). Nearly half of pre-war Poland was expropriated by the Soviet Union, including the two great cultural centers of Lwów and Wilno.

The policies of Nazi Germany have been judged after the war by the International Military Tribunal at the Nuremberg trials and Polish genocide trials to be aimed at extermination of Jews, Poles and Roma, and to have "all the characteristics of genocide in the biological meaning of this term".

=== Changing boundaries and population transfers ===
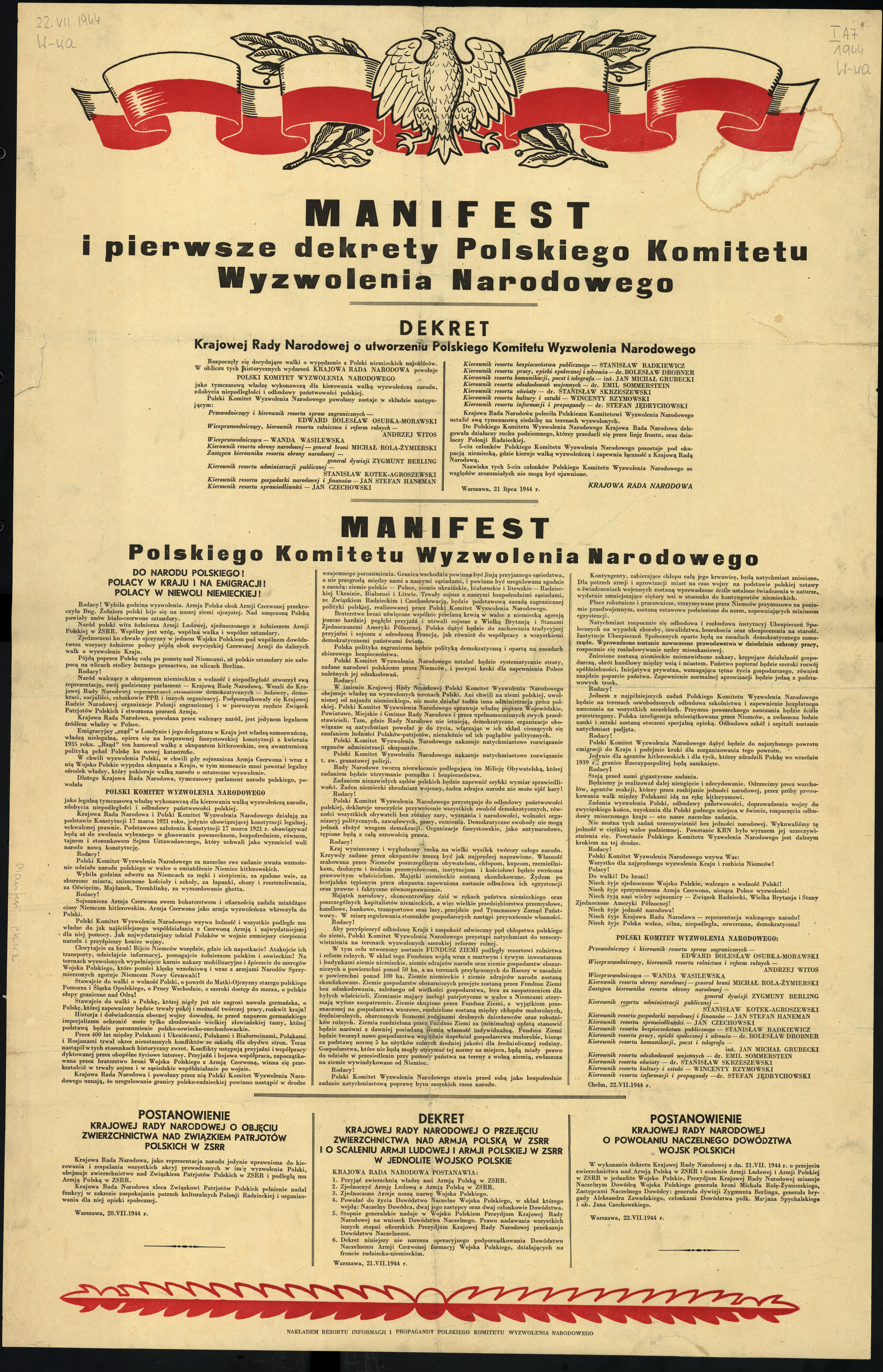
The PKWN Manifesto, officially issued on 22 July 1944 in Soviet-liberated Poland. It heralded the arrival of a Polish communist government imposed by the USSR.

By the terms of the 1945 Potsdam Agreement signed by the three victorious Great Powers, the Soviet Union retained most of the territories captured as a result of the Molotov–Ribbentrop Pact of 1939, including western Ukraine and western Belarus, and gained others. Lithuania and the Königsberg area of East Prussia were officially incorporated into the Soviet Union, in the case of the former without the recognition of the Western powers.

Poland was compensated with the bulk of Silesia, including Breslau (Wrocław) and Grünberg (Zielona Góra), the bulk of Pomerania, including Stettin (Szczecin), and the greater southern portion of the former East Prussia, along with Danzig (Gdańsk), pending a final peace conference with Germany which eventually never took place. Collectively referred to by the Polish authorities as the "Recovered Territories", they were included in the reconstituted Polish state. With Germany's defeat Poland was thus shifted west in relation to its prewar location, to the area between the Oder–Neisse and Curzon lines, which resulted in a country more compact and with much broader access to the sea.^{[c]} The Poles lost 70% of their pre-war oil capacity to the Soviets, but gained from the Germans a highly developed industrial base and infrastructure that made a diversified industrial economy possible for the first time in Polish history.

The flight and expulsion of Germans from what was eastern Germany prior to the war began before and during the Soviet conquest of those regions from the Nazis, and the process continued in the years immediately after the war. 8,030,000 Germans were evacuated, expelled, or migrated by 1950.

Territorial changes of Poland immediately after World War II: the gray territories were transferred from Poland to the Soviet Union, whereas the pink territories were transferred from Germany to Poland. Poland's new eastern border was adjusted in the following years.

Early expulsions in Poland were undertaken by the Polish communist authorities even before the Potsdam Conference (the "wild expulsions" from June to mid July 1945, when the Polish military and militia expelled nearly all people from the districts immediately east of the Oder–Neisse line), to ensure the establishment of ethnically homogeneous Poland. About 1% (100,000) of the German civilian population east of the Oder–Neisse line perished in the fighting prior to the surrender in May 1945, and afterwards some 200,000 Germans in Poland were employed as forced labor prior to being expelled. Many Germans died in labor camps such as the Zgoda labour camp and the Potulice camp. Of those Germans who remained within the new borders of Poland, many later chose to emigrate to post-war Germany.

On the other hand, 1.5–2 million ethnic Poles moved or were expelled from the previously Polish areas annexed by the Soviet Union. The vast majority were resettled in the former German territories. At least one million Poles remained in what had become the Soviet Union, and at least half a million ended up in the West or elsewhere outside of Poland. However, contrary to the official declaration that the former German inhabitants of the Recovered Territories had to be removed quickly to house Poles displaced by the Soviet annexation, the Recovered Territories initially faced a severe population shortage.

Many exiled Poles could not return to the country for which they had fought because they belonged to political groups incompatible with the new communist regimes, or because they originated from areas of pre-war eastern Poland that were incorporated into the Soviet Union (see Polish population transfers (1944–1946)). Some were deterred from returning simply on the strength of warnings that anyone who had served in military units in the West would be endangered. Many Poles were pursued, arrested, tortured and imprisoned by the Soviet authorities for belonging to the Home Army or other formations (see Anti-communist resistance in Poland (1944–1946)), or were persecuted because they had fought on the Western front.

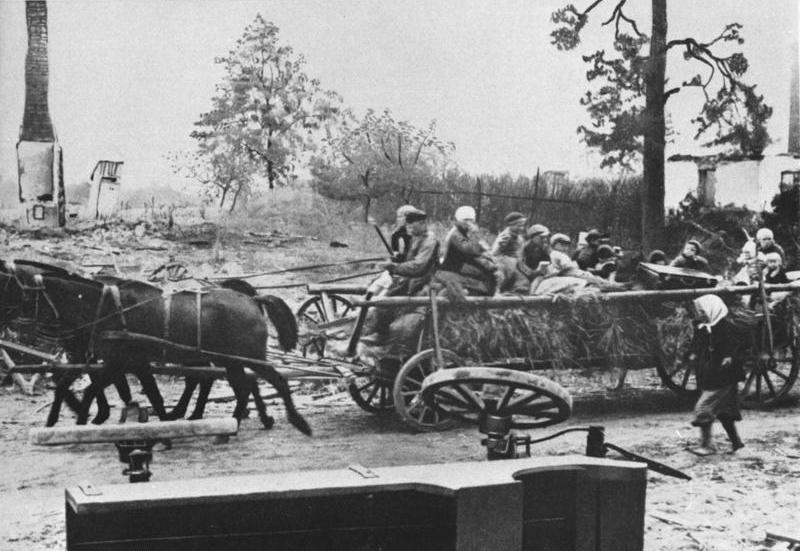
German refugees fleeing from East Prussia, 1945

Territories on both sides of the new Polish-Ukrainian border were also "ethnically cleansed". Of the Ukrainians and Lemkos living in Poland within the new borders (about 700,000), close to 95% were forcibly moved to the Soviet Ukraine, or (in 1947) to the new territories in northern and western Poland under Operation Vistula. In Volhynia, 98% of the Polish pre-war population was either killed or expelled; in Eastern Galicia, the Polish population was reduced by 92%. According to Timothy D. Snyder, about 70,000 Poles and about 20,000 Ukrainians were killed in the ethnic violence that occurred in the 1940s, both during and after the war.

According to an estimate by historian Jan Grabowski, about 50,000 of the 250,000 Polish Jews who escaped the Nazis during the liquidation of ghettos survived without leaving Poland (the remainder perished). More were repatriated from the Soviet Union and elsewhere, and the February 1946 population census showed about 300,000 Jews within Poland's new borders.^{[e]} Of the surviving Jews, many chose to emigrate or felt compelled to because of the anti-Jewish violence in Poland.

Because of changing borders and the mass movements of people of various nationalities, the emerging communist Poland ended up with a mainly homogeneous, ethnically Polish population (97.6% according to the December 1950 census). The remaining members of ethnic minorities were not encouraged, by the authorities or by their neighbors, to emphasize their ethnic identities.^{[i]}^{[a1]}

== Polish People's Republic (1945–1989) ==
=== Post-war struggle for power ===
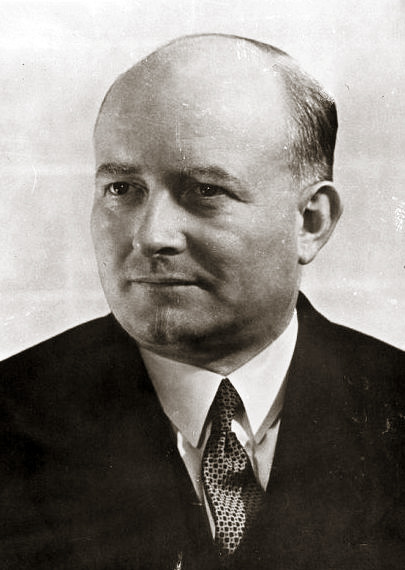
Stanisław Mikołajczyk's Polish People's Party tried to outvote the communists in 1947, but the election process was rigged. Mikołajczyk had to flee to the West.

In response to the February 1945 Yalta Conference directives, a Polish Provisional Government of National Unity was formed in June 1945 under Soviet auspices; it was soon recognized by the United States and many other countries. The Soviet domination was apparent from the beginning, as prominent leaders of the Polish Underground State were brought to trial in Moscow (the "Trial of the Sixteen" of June 1945). In the immediate post-war years, the emerging communist rule was challenged by opposition groups, including militarily by the so-called "cursed soldiers", of whom thousands perished in armed confrontations or were pursued by the Ministry of Public Security and executed. Such guerillas often pinned their hopes on expectations of an imminent outbreak of World War III and defeat of the Soviet Union. The Polish right-wing insurgency faded after the amnesty of February 1947.

The Polish people's referendum of June 1946 was arranged by the communist Polish Workers' Party to legitimize its dominance in Polish politics and claim widespread support for the party's policies. Although the Yalta agreement called for free elections, the Polish legislative election of January 1947 was controlled by the communists. Some democratic and pro-Western elements, led by Stanisław Mikołajczyk, former prime minister-in-exile, participated in the Provisional Government and the 1947 elections, but were ultimately eliminated through electoral fraud, intimidation and violence. In times of severe political confrontation and radical economic change, members of Mikołajczyk's agrarian movement (the Polish People's Party) attempted to preserve the existing aspects of mixed economy and protect property and other rights. However, after the 1947 elections, the Government of National Unity ceased to exist and the communists moved towards abolishing the post-war partially pluralistic "people's democracy" and replacing it with a state socialist system. The communist-dominated front Democratic Bloc of the 1947 elections, turned into the Front of National Unity in 1952, became officially the source of governmental authority. The Polish government-in-exile, lacking international recognition, remained in continuous existence until 1990.

=== Under Stalinism (1948–1955) ===
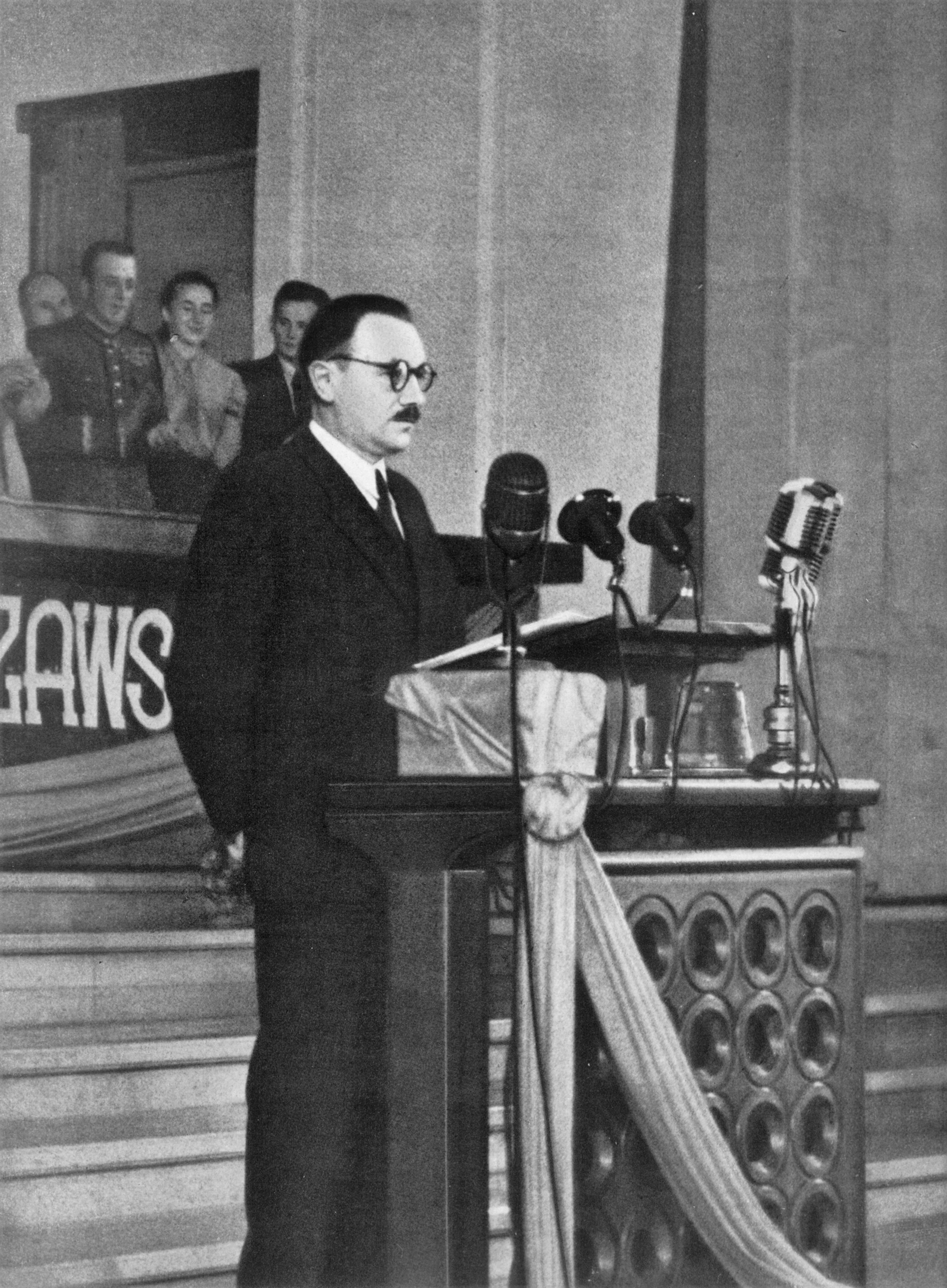
President Bolesław Bierut, leader of Stalinist Poland

The Polish People's Republic (Polska Rzeczpospolita Ludowa) was established under the rule of the communist Polish United Workers' Party (PZPR). The name change from the Polish Republic was not officially adopted, however, until the proclamation of the Constitution of the Polish People's Republic in 1952.

The ruling PZPR was formed by the forced amalgamation in December 1948 of the communist Polish Workers' Party (PPR) and the historically non-communist Polish Socialist Party (PPS). The PPR chief had been its wartime leader Władysław Gomułka, who in 1947 declared a "Polish road to socialism" as intended to curb, rather than eradicate, capitalist elements. In 1948 he was overruled, removed and imprisoned by Stalinist authorities. The PPS, re-established in 1944 by its left wing, had since been allied with the communists. The ruling communists, who in post-war Poland preferred to use the term "socialism" instead of "communism" to identify their ideological basis,^{[f]} needed to include the socialist junior partner to broaden their appeal, claim greater legitimacy and eliminate competition on the political Left. The socialists, who were losing their organization, were subjected to political pressure, ideological cleansing and purges in order to become suitable for unification on the terms of the PPR. The leading pro-communist leaders of the socialists were the prime ministers Edward Osóbka-Morawski and Józef Cyrankiewicz.

During the most oppressive phase of the Stalinist period (1948–1953), terror was justified in Poland as necessary to eliminate reactionary subversion. Many thousands of perceived dissidents were arbitrarily tried and large numbers were executed.^{[u]} The People's Republic was led by discredited Soviet operatives such as Bolesław Bierut, Jakub Berman and Konstantin Rokossovsky. The independent Catholic Church in Poland was subjected to property confiscations and other curtailments from 1949, and in 1950 was pressured into signing an accord with the government. In 1953 and later, despite a partial thaw after the death of Stalin that year, the persecution of the Church intensified and its head, Cardinal Stefan Wyszyński, was detained. A key event in the persecution of the Polish Church was the Stalinist show trial of the Kraków Curia in January 1953.

In the Warsaw Pact, formed in 1955, the Polish Army was the second largest, after the Soviet Army.

=== Economic and social developments of the early communist era ===
In 1944, large agricultural holdings and former German property in Poland started to be redistributed through land reform, and industry started to be nationalized. Communist restructuring and the imposition of work-space rules encountered active worker opposition already in the years 1945–1947. The moderate Three-Year Plan of 1947–1949 continued with the rebuilding, socialization and socialist restructuring of the economy. It was followed by the Six-Year Plan of 1950–1955 for heavy industry. The rejection of the Marshall Plan in 1947 made aspirations for catching up with West European standards of living unrealistic.

The government's highest economic priority was the development of heavy industry useful to the military. State-run or controlled institutions common in all the socialist countries of eastern Europe were imposed on Poland, including collective farms and worker cooperatives. The latter were dismantled in the late 1940s as not socialist enough, although they were later re-established; even small-scale private enterprises were eradicated. Stalinism introduced heavy political and ideological propaganda and indoctrination in social life, culture and education.

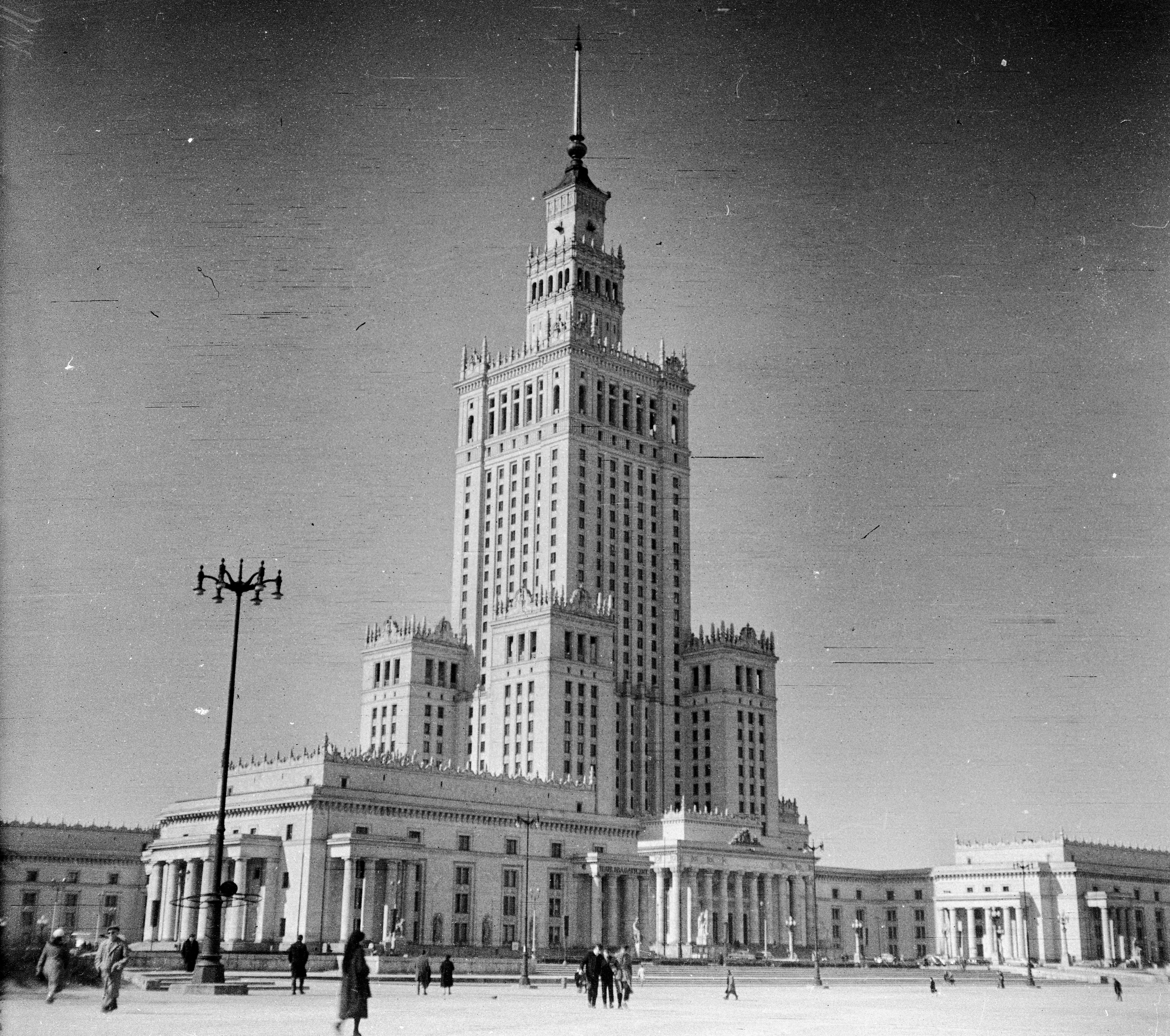
Communist aspirations were symbolized by the Palace of Culture and Science in Warsaw

Great strides were made, however, in the areas of employment (which became nearly full), universal public education (which nearly eradicated adult illiteracy), health care and recreational amenities. Many historic sites, including the central districts of Warsaw and Gdańsk, both devastated during the war, were rebuilt at great cost.

The communist industrialization program led to increased urbanization and educational and career opportunities for the intended beneficiaries of the social transformation, along the lines of the peasants-workers-working intelligentsia paradigm. The most significant improvement was accomplished in the lives of Polish peasants, many of whom were able to leave their impoverished and overcrowded village communities for better conditions in urban centers. Those who stayed behind took advantage of the implementation of the 1944 land reform decree of the Polish Committee of National Liberation, which terminated the antiquated but widespread parafeudal socioeconomic relations in Poland. The Stalinist attempts at establishing collective farms generally failed. Due to urbanization, the national percentage of the rural population decreased in communist Poland by about 50%. A majority of Poland's residents of cities and towns still live in apartment blocks built during the communist era, in part to accommodate migrants from rural areas.

=== The Thaw and Gomułka's Polish October (1955–1958) ===
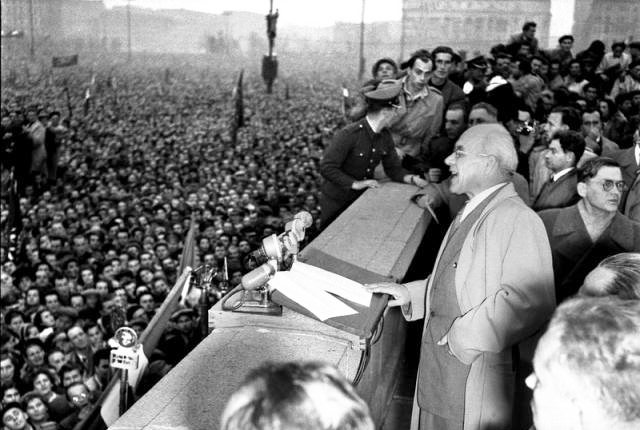
Władysław Gomułka addressing the crowd in Warsaw in October 1956

In March 1956, after the 20th Congress of the Communist Party of the Soviet Union in Moscow ushered in de-Stalinization, Edward Ochab was chosen to replace the deceased Bolesław Bierut as first secretary of the Polish United Workers' Party. As a result, Poland was rapidly overtaken by social restlessness and reformist undertakings; thousands of political prisoners were released and many people previously persecuted were officially rehabilitated. Worker riots in Poznań in June 1956 were violently suppressed, but they gave rise to the formation of a reformist current within the communist party.

Amidst the continuing social and national upheaval, a further shakeup took place in the party leadership as part of what is known as the Polish October of 1956.^{[k]} While retaining most traditional communist economic and social aims, the state under Władysław Gomułka, the new first secretary of the PZPR, liberalized internal life in Poland. The dependence on the Soviet Union was somewhat mollified, and the state's relationships with the Church and Catholic lay activists were put on a new footing. A repatriation agreement with the Soviet Union allowed the repatriation of hundreds of thousands of Poles who were still in Soviet hands, including many former political prisoners. Collectivization efforts were abandoned—agricultural land, unlike in other Comecon countries, remained for the most part in the private ownership of farming families. State-mandated provisions of agricultural products at fixed, artificially low prices were reduced, and from 1972 eliminated.

The legislative election of 1957 was followed by several years of political stability that was accompanied by economic stagnation and curtailment of reforms and reformists. One of the last initiatives of the brief reform era was a nuclear weapons–free zone in Central Europe proposed in 1957 by Adam Rapacki, Poland's foreign minister.

Culture in the Polish People's Republic, to varying degrees linked to the intelligentsia's opposition to the authoritarian system, developed to a sophisticated level under Gomułka and his successors. The creative process was often compromised by state censorship, but significant works were created in fields such as literature, theater, cinema and music, among others. Journalism of veiled understanding and varieties of native and Western popular culture were well represented. Uncensored information and works generated by émigré circles were conveyed through a variety of channels. The Paris-based Kultura magazine developed a conceptual framework for dealing with the issues of borders and the neighbors of a future free Poland, but for ordinary Poles Radio Free Europe was of foremost importance.

=== Stagnation and crackdown (1958–1970) ===
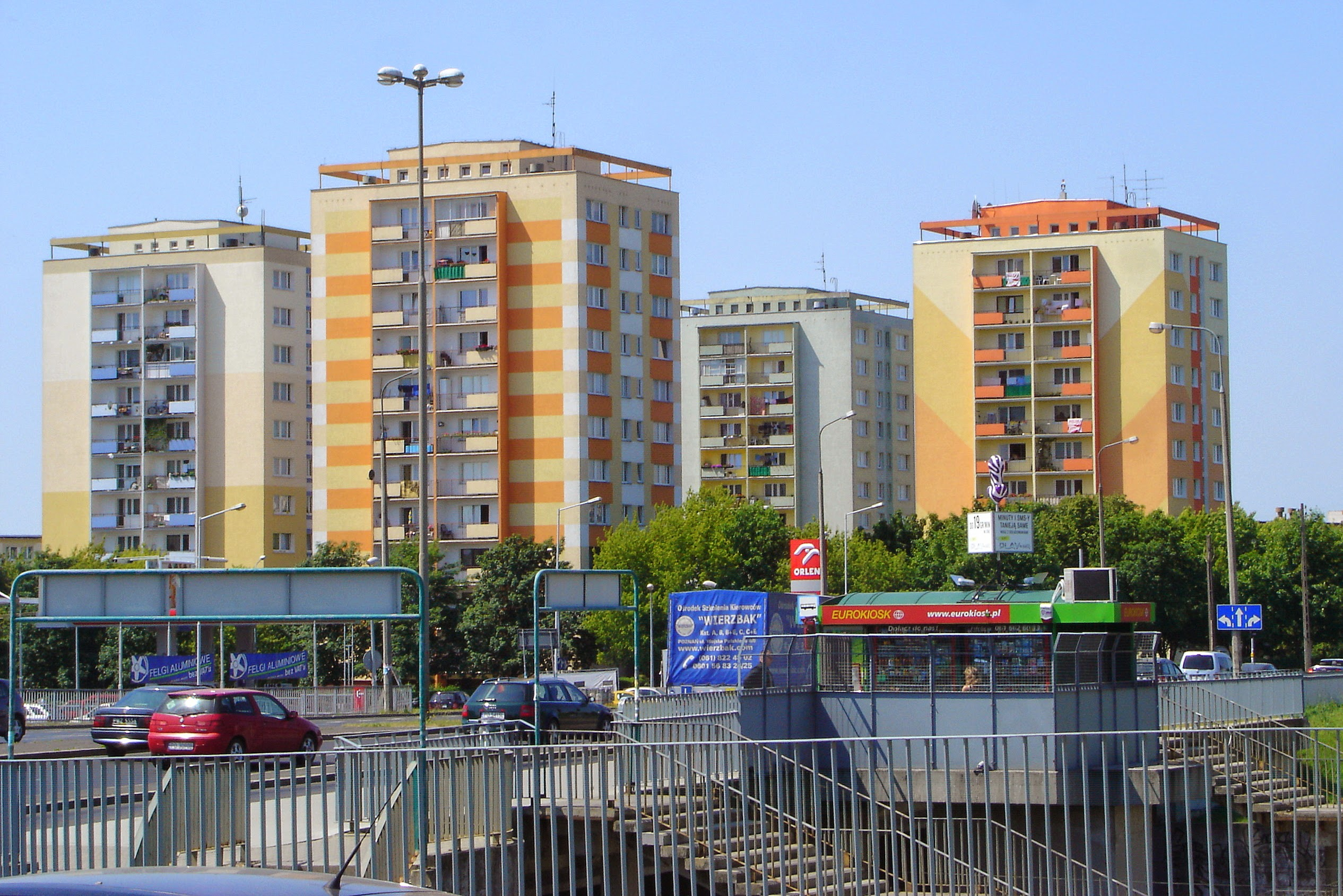
Apartment blocks built in communist Poland (these located in Poznań)

One of the confirmations of the end of an era of greater tolerance was the expulsion from the communist party of several prominent "Marxist revisionists" in the 1960s.

In 1965, the Conference of Polish Bishops issued the Letter of Reconciliation of the Polish Bishops to the German Bishops, a gesture intended to heal bad mutual feelings left over from World War II. In 1966, the celebrations of the 1,000th anniversary of the Christianization of Poland led by Cardinal Stefan Wyszyński and other bishops turned into a huge demonstration of the power and popularity of the Catholic Church in Poland.

The post-1956 liberalizing trend, in decline for a number of years, was reversed in March 1968, when student demonstrations were suppressed during the 1968 Polish political crisis. Motivated in part by the Prague Spring movement, the Polish opposition leaders, intellectuals, academics and students used a historical-patriotic Dziady theater spectacle series in Warsaw (and its termination forced by the authorities) as a springboard for protests, which soon spread to other centers of higher education and turned nationwide. The authorities responded with a major crackdown on opposition activity, including the firing of faculty and the dismissal of students at universities and other institutions of learning. At the center of the controversy was also the small number of Catholic deputies in the Sejm (the Znak Association members) who attempted to defend the students.

In an official speech, Gomułka drew attention to the role of Jewish activists in the events taking place. This provided ammunition to a nationalistic and antisemitic communist party faction headed by Mieczysław Moczar that was opposed to Gomułka's leadership. Using the context of the military victory of Israel in the Six-Day War of 1967, some in the Polish communist leadership waged an antisemitic campaign against the remnants of the Jewish community in Poland. The targets of this campaign were accused of disloyalty and active sympathy with Israeli aggression. Branded "Zionists", they were scapegoated and blamed for the unrest in March 1968, which eventually led to the emigration of much of Poland's remaining Jewish population (about 15,000 Polish citizens left the country).

With the active support of the Gomułka regime, the Polish People's Army took part in the infamous Warsaw Pact invasion of Czechoslovakia in August 1968, after the Brezhnev Doctrine was informally announced.

In the final major achievement of Gomułka diplomacy, the governments of Poland and West Germany signed in December 1970 the Treaty of Warsaw, which normalized their relations and made possible meaningful cooperation in a number of areas of bilateral interest. In particular, West Germany recognized the post-World War II de facto border between Poland and East Germany.

=== Worker revolts, reforms of Gierek, the Polish pope and Solidarity (1970–1981) ===
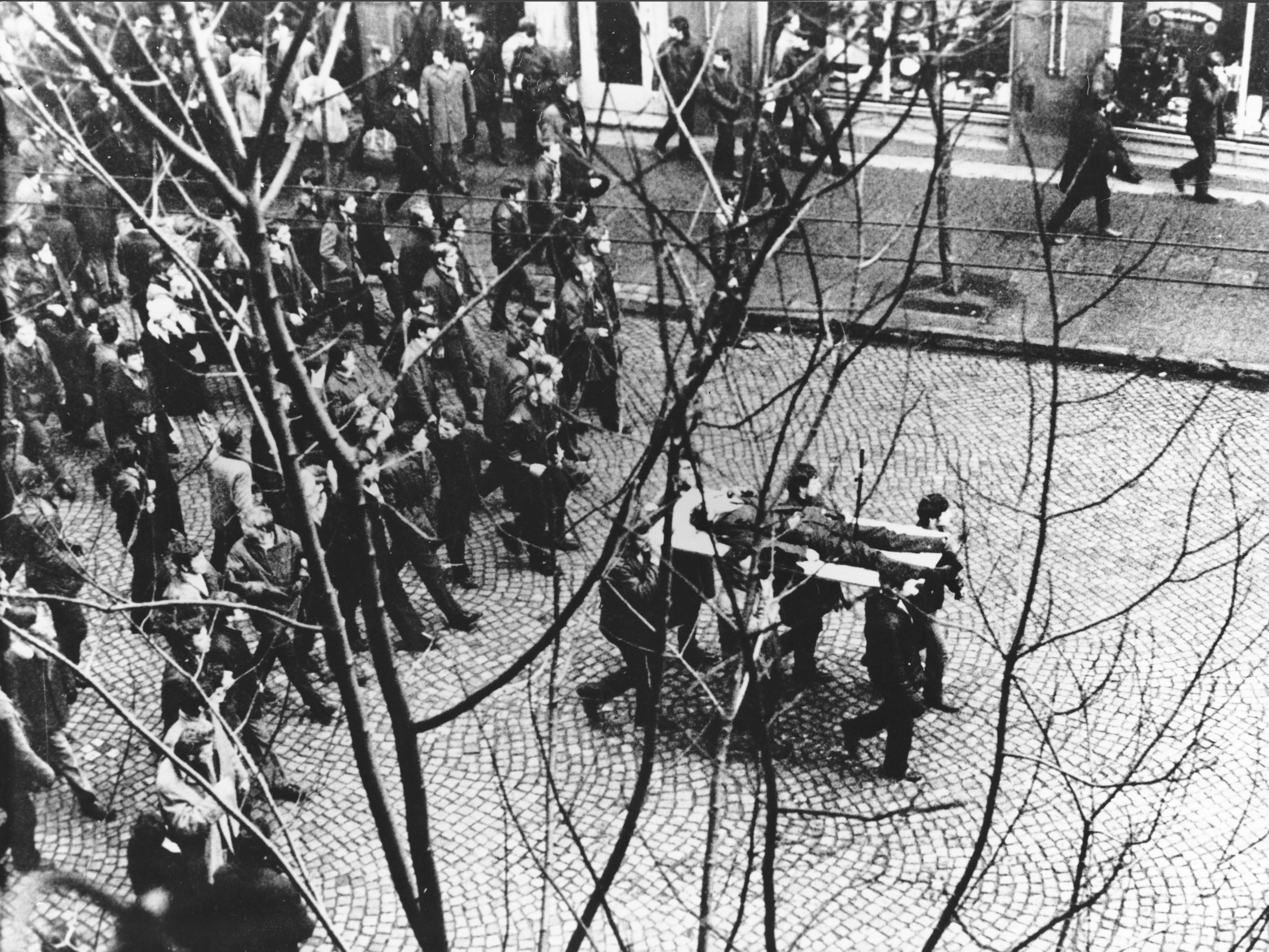
One of the fatalities of the 1970 protests on the Baltic Coast

Price increases for essential consumer goods triggered the Polish protests of 1970. In December, there were disturbances and strikes in the Baltic Sea port cities of Gdańsk, Gdynia, and Szczecin that reflected deep dissatisfaction with living and working conditions in the country. The activity was centered in the industrial shipyard areas of the three coastal cities. Dozens of protesting workers and bystanders were killed in police and military actions, generally under the authority of Gomułka and Minister of Defense Wojciech Jaruzelski. In the aftermath, Edward Gierek replaced Gomułka as first secretary of the communist party. The new regime was seen as more modern, friendly and pragmatic, and at first it enjoyed a degree of popular and foreign support.^{[g]}^{[o]}

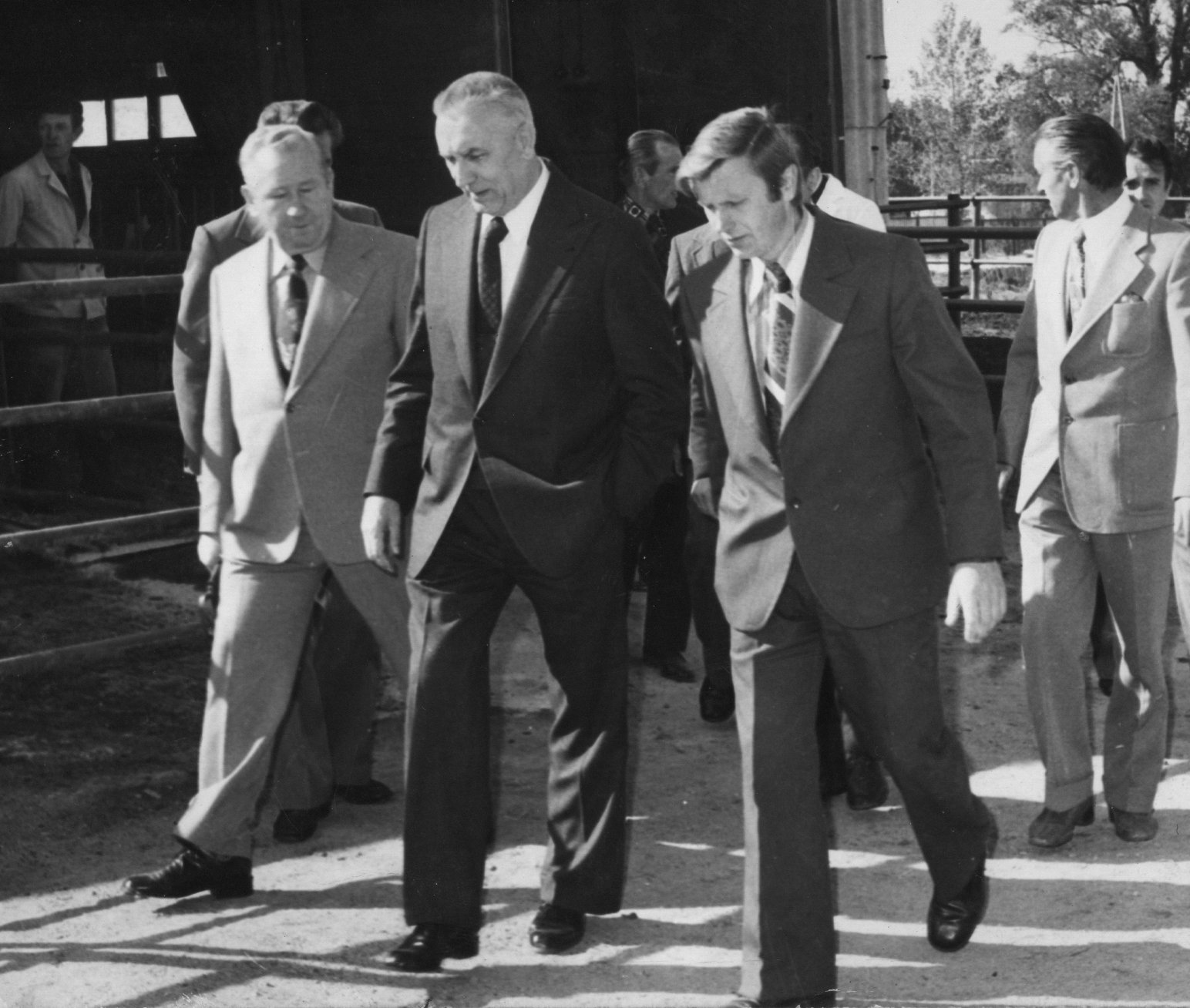
First Secretary Edward Gierek (second from left) was unable to reverse Poland's economic decline

To revitalize the economy, from 1971 the Gierek regime introduced wide-ranging reforms that involved large-scale foreign borrowing. These actions initially caused improved conditions for consumers, but in a few years the strategy backfired and the economy deteriorated. Another attempt to raise food prices resulted in the June 1976 protests. The Workers' Defence Committee (KOR), established in response to the crackdown that followed, consisted of dissident intellectuals determined to support industrial workers, farmers and students persecuted by the authorities. The opposition circles active in the late 1970s were emboldened by the Helsinki Conference processes.

In October 1978, the Archbishop of Kraków, Cardinal Karol Józef Wojtyła, became Pope John Paul II, head of the Catholic Church. Catholics and others rejoiced at the elevation of a Pole to the papacy and greeted his June 1979 visit to Poland with an outpouring of emotion.

Fueled by large infusions of Western credit, Poland's economic growth rate was one of the world's highest during the first half of the 1970s, but much of the borrowed capital was misspent, and the centrally planned economy was unable to use the new resources effectively. The 1973 oil crisis caused recession and high interest rates in the West, to which the Polish government had to respond with sharp domestic consumer price increases. The growing debt burden became insupportable in the late 1970s, and negative economic growth set in by 1979.

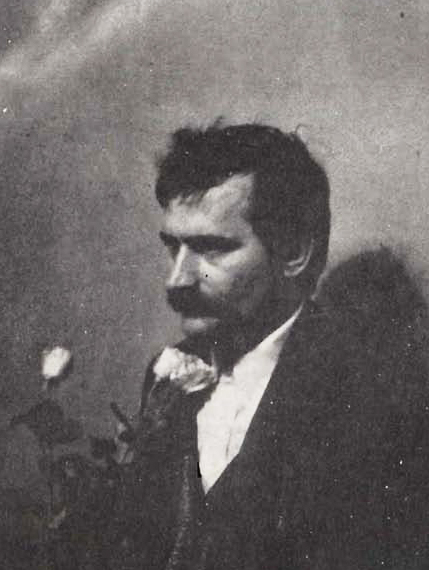
Lech Wałęsa in 1980

Around 1 July 1980, with the Polish foreign debt standing at more than $20 billion, the government made yet another attempt to increase meat prices. Workers responded with escalating work stoppages that culminated in the 1980 general strikes in Lublin. In mid-August, labor protests at the Gdańsk Shipyard gave rise to a chain reaction of strikes that virtually paralyzed the Baltic coast by the end of the month and, for the first time, closed most coal mines in Silesia. The Inter-Enterprise Strike Committee coordinated the strike action across hundreds of workplaces and formulated the 21 demands as the basis for negotiations with the authorities. The Strike Committee was sovereign in its decision-making, but was aided by a team of "expert" advisers that included the well-known dissidents Jacek Kuroń, Karol Modzelewski, Bronisław Geremek and Tadeusz Mazowiecki.

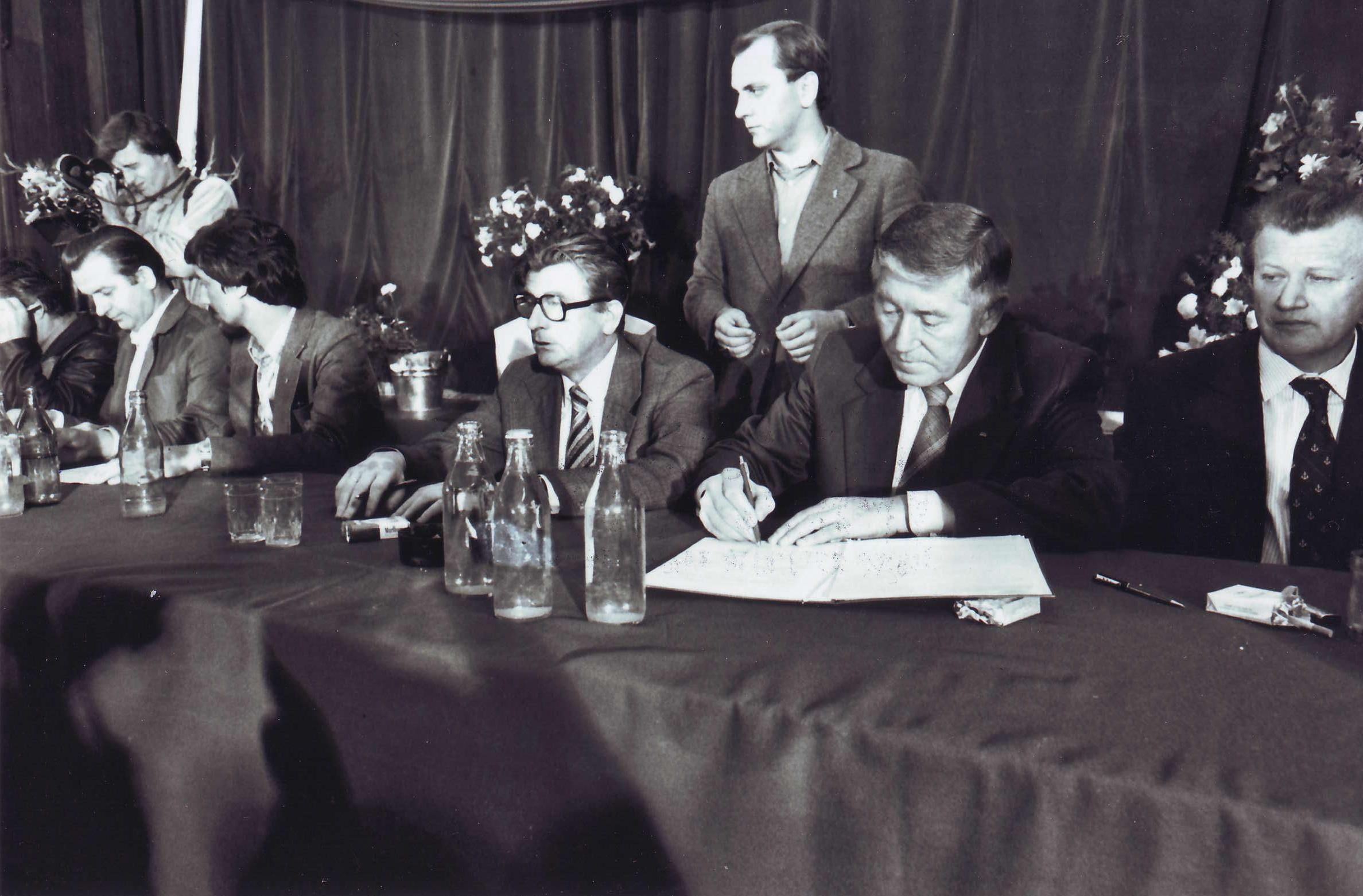
The signing of an agreement between leaders of striking workers and government representatives in Szczecin in August 1980

On 31 August 1980, representatives of workers at the Gdańsk Shipyard, led by an electrician and activist Lech Wałęsa, signed the Gdańsk Agreement with the government that ended their strike. Similar agreements were concluded in Szczecin (the Szczecin Agreement) and in Silesia. The key provision of these agreements was the guarantee of the workers' right to form independent trade unions and the right to strike. Following the successful resolution of the largest labor confrontation in communist Poland's history, nationwide union organizing movements swept the country.

Edward Gierek was blamed by the Soviets for not following their "fraternal" advice, not shoring up the communist party and the official trade unions and allowing "anti-socialist" forces to emerge. On 5 September 1980, Gierek was replaced by Stanisław Kania as first secretary of the PZPR.

Delegates of the emergent worker committees from all over Poland gathered in Gdańsk on 17 September and decided to form a single national union organization named "Solidarity".

While party–controlled courts took up the contentious issues of Solidarity's legal registration as a trade union (finalized by November 10), planning had already begun for the imposition of martial law. A parallel farmers' union was organized and strongly opposed by the regime, but Rural Solidarity was eventually registered (12 May 1981). In the meantime, a rapid deterioration of the authority of the communist party, disintegration of state power and escalation of demands and threats by the various Solidarity–affiliated groups were occurring. According to Kuroń, a "tremendous social democratization movement in all spheres" was taking place and could not be contained. Wałęsa had meetings with Kania, which brought no resolution to the impasse.

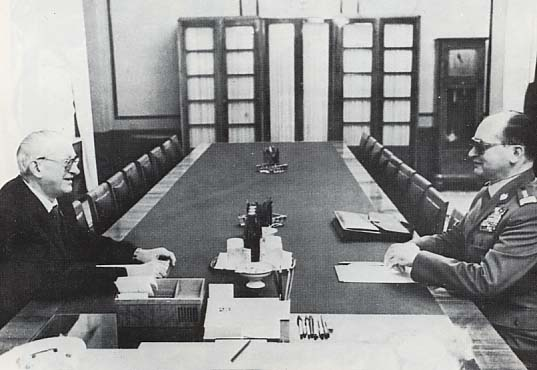
General Wojciech Jaruzelski meeting Soviet security chief Yuri Andropov during the 1980 crisis. Jaruzelski was about to become the (last) leader of communist Poland.

Following the Warsaw Pact summit in Moscow, the Soviet Union proceeded with a massive military build-up along Poland's border in December 1980, but during the summit Kania forcefully argued with Leonid Brezhnev and other allied communists leaders against the feasibility of an external military intervention, and no action was taken. The United States, under presidents Jimmy Carter and Ronald Reagan, repeatedly warned the Soviets about the consequences of a direct intervention, while discouraging an open insurrection in Poland and signaling to the Polish opposition that there would be no rescue by the NATO forces.

In February 1981, Defense Minister General Wojciech Jaruzelski assumed the position of prime minister. The Solidarity social revolt had thus far been free of any major use of force, but in March 1981 in Bydgoszcz three activists were beaten up by the secret police. In a nationwide "warning strike" the 9.5-million-strong Solidarity union was supported by the population at large, but a general strike was called off by Wałęsa after the 30 March settlement with the government. Both Solidarity and the communist party were badly split and the Soviets were losing patience. Kania was re-elected at the Party Congress in July, but the collapse of the economy continued and so did the general disorder.

At the first Solidarity National Congress in September–October 1981 in Gdańsk, Lech Wałęsa was elected national chairman of the union with 55% of the vote. An appeal was issued to the workers of the other East European countries, urging them to follow in the footsteps of Solidarity. To the Soviets, the gathering was an "anti-socialist and anti-Soviet orgy" and the Polish communist leaders, increasingly led by Jaruzelski and General Czesław Kiszczak, were ready to apply force.

In October 1981, Jaruzelski was named first secretary of the PZPR. The Plenum's vote was 180 to 4, and he kept his government posts. Jaruzelski asked parliament to ban strikes and allow him to exercise extraordinary powers, but when neither request was granted, he decided to proceed with his plans anyway.

=== The martial law, Jaruzelski's rule and the end of communism (1981–1989) ===
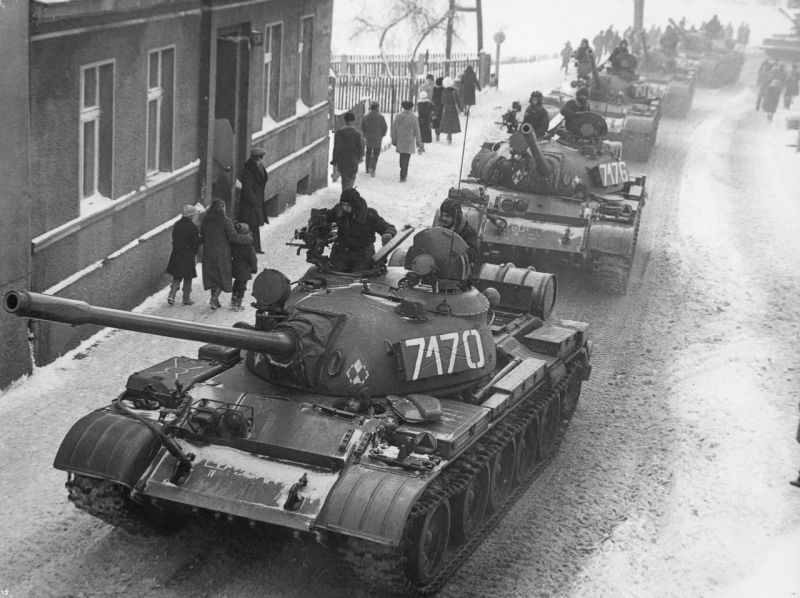
Martial law enforced in December 1981

On 12–13 December 1981, the regime declared martial law in Poland, under which the army and the ZOMO special police forces were used to crush Solidarity. The Soviet leaders insisted that Jaruzelski pacifies the opposition with the forces at his disposal, without Soviet involvement. Almost all Solidarity leaders and many affiliated intellectuals were arrested or detained. Nine workers were killed in the Pacification of Wujek. The United States and other Western countries responded by imposing economic sanctions against Poland and the Soviet Union. Unrest in the country was subdued, but continued.

During martial law, Poland was ruled by the so-called Military Council of National Salvation. The open or semi-open opposition communications, as recently practiced, were replaced by underground publishing (known in the eastern bloc as Samizdat), and Solidarity was reduced to a few thousand underground activists.

Having achieved some semblance of stability, the Polish regime relaxed and then rescinded martial law over several stages. By December 1982 martial law was suspended and a small number of political prisoners, including Wałęsa, were released. Although martial law formally ended in July 1983 and a partial amnesty was enacted, several hundred political prisoners remained in jail. Jerzy Popiełuszko, a popular pro-Solidarity priest, was abducted and murdered by security functionaries in October 1984.

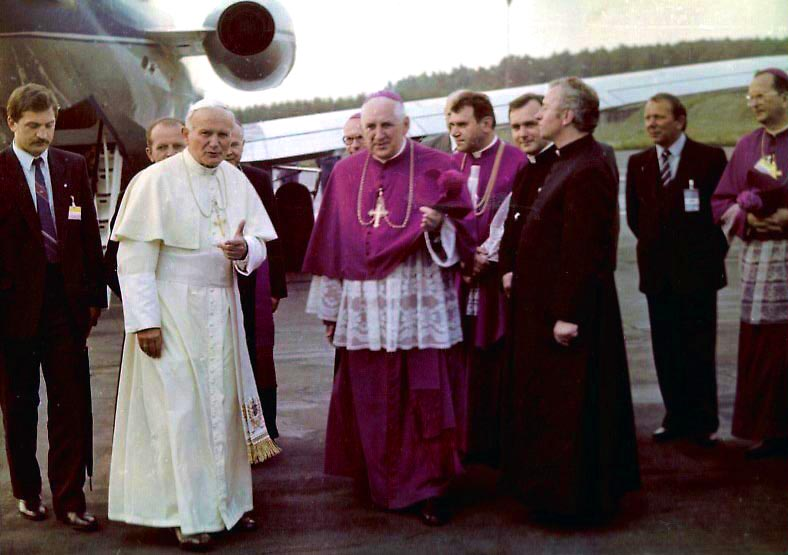
Pope John Paul II in Poland, 1987

Further developments in Poland occurred concurrently with and were influenced by the reformist leadership of Mikhail Gorbachev in the Soviet Union (processes known as Glasnost and Perestroika). In September 1986, a general amnesty was declared and the government released nearly all political prisoners. However, the country lacked basic stability, as the regime's efforts to organize society from the top down had failed, while the opposition's attempts at creating an "alternate society" were also unsuccessful. With the economic crisis unresolved and societal institutions dysfunctional, both the ruling establishment and the opposition began looking for ways out of the stalemate. Facilitated by the indispensable mediation of the Catholic Church, exploratory contacts were established.

Student protests resumed in February 1988. Continuing economic decline led to strikes across the country in April, May and August. The Soviet Union, increasingly destabilized, was unwilling to apply military or other pressure to prop up allied regimes in trouble. The Polish government felt compelled to negotiate with the opposition and in September 1988 preliminary talks with Solidarity leaders ensued in Magdalenka. Numerous meetings that took place involved Wałęsa and General Kiszczak, among others. In November, the regime made a major public relations mistake by allowing a televised debate between Wałęsa and Alfred Miodowicz, chief of the All-Poland Alliance of Trade Unions, the official trade union organization. The fitful bargaining and intra-party squabbling led to the official Round Table Negotiations in 1989, followed by the Polish legislative election in June of that year, a watershed event marking the fall of communism in Poland.

== Third Polish Republic (1989–today) ==
=== Systemic transition ===
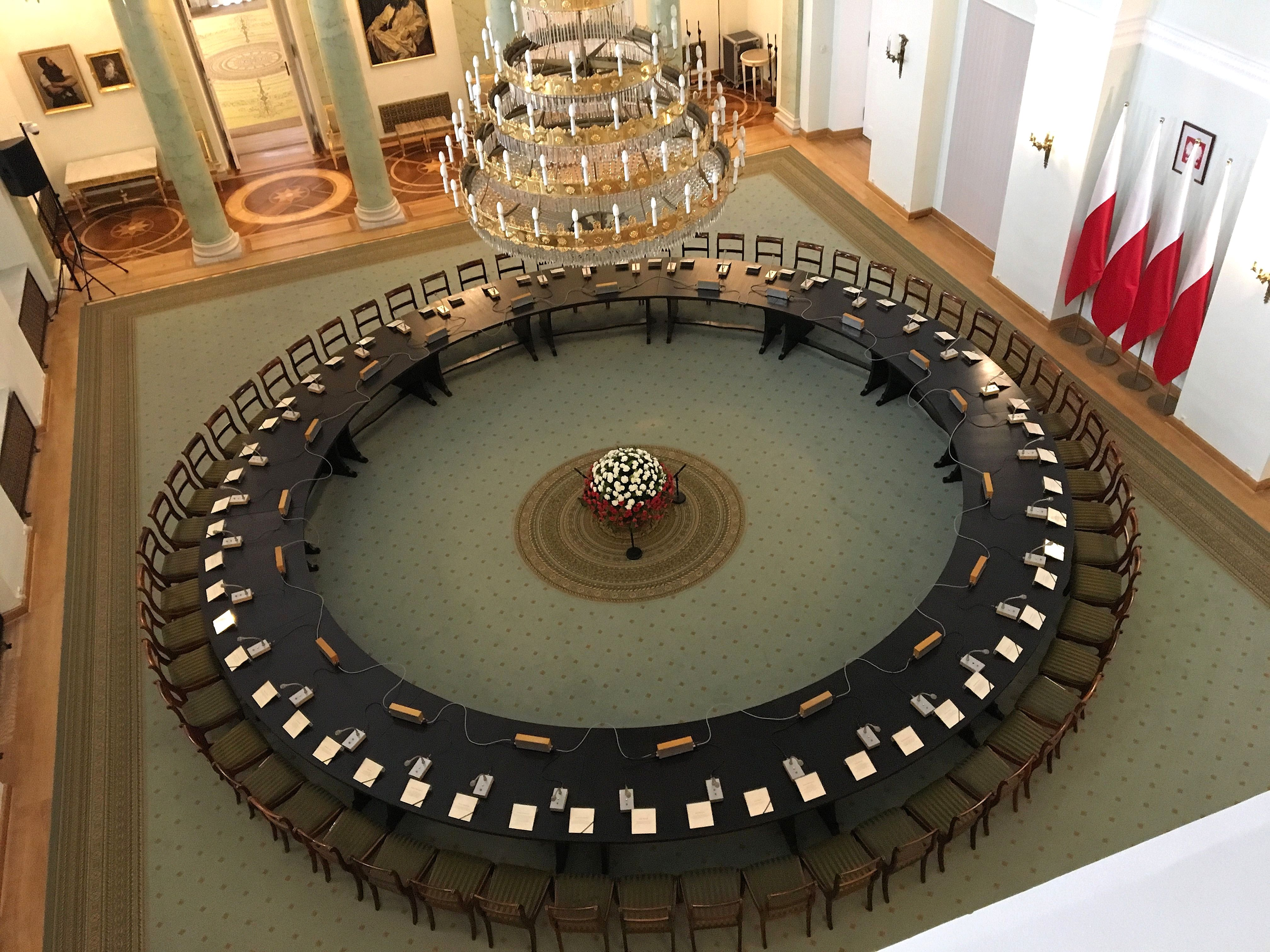
The reconstructed Polish Round Table in the Presidential Palace where an agreement between the communists and the opposition was signed on 4 April 1989

The Polish Round Table Agreement of April 1989 called for local self-government, policies of job guarantees, legalization of independent trade unions and many wide-ranging reforms. The current Sejm promptly implemented the deal and agreed to National Assembly elections that were set for 4 June and 18 June. Only 35% of the seats in the Sejm (national legislature's lower house) and all of the Senate seats were freely contested; the remaining Sejm seats (65%) were guaranteed for the communists and their allies.

The failure of the communists at the polls (almost all of the contested seats were won by the opposition) resulted in a political crisis. The new April Novelization to the constitution called for re-establishment of the Polish presidency and on 19 July the National Assembly elected the communist leader, General Wojciech Jaruzelski, to that office. His election, seen at the time as politically necessary, was barely accomplished with tacit support from some Solidarity deputies, and the new president's position was not strong. Moreover, the unexpected definitiveness of the parliamentary election results created new political dynamics and attempts by the communists to form a government failed.

On 19 August, President Jaruzelski asked journalist and Solidarity activist Tadeusz Mazowiecki to form a government; on 12 September, the Sejm voted approval of Prime Minister Mazowiecki and his cabinet. Mazowiecki decided to leave the economic reform entirely in the hands of economic liberals led by the new Deputy Prime Minister Leszek Balcerowicz, who proceeded with the design and implementation of his "shock therapy" policy. For the first time in post-war history, Poland had a government led by non-communists, setting a precedent soon to be followed by other Eastern Bloc nations in a phenomenon known as the Revolutions of 1989. Mazowiecki's acceptance of the "thick line" formula meant that there would be no "witch-hunt", i.e., an absence of revenge seeking or exclusion from politics in regard to former communist officials.

In part because of the attempted indexation of wages, inflation reached 900% by the end of 1989, but was soon dealt with by means of radical methods. In December 1989, the Sejm approved the Balcerowicz Plan to transform the Polish economy rapidly from a centrally planned one to a free market economy.^{[v]} The Constitution of the Polish People's Republic was amended to eliminate references to the "leading role" of the communist party and the country was renamed the "Republic of Poland". The communist Polish United Workers' Party dissolved itself in January 1990. In its place, a new party, Social Democracy of the Republic of Poland, was created. "Territorial self-government", abolished in 1950, was legislated back in March 1990, to be led by locally elected officials; its fundamental unit was the administratively independent gmina.^{[q]}

In October 1990, the constitution was amended to curtail the term of President Jaruzelski. In November 1990, the German–Polish Border Treaty, with unified Germany, was signed.

In November 1990, Lech Wałęsa was elected president for a five-year term; in December, he became the first popularly elected president of Poland. Poland's first free parliamentary election was held in October 1991. 18 parties entered the new Sejm, but the largest representation received only 12% of the total vote.

=== Democratic constitution, NATO and European Union memberships ===
There were several post-Solidarity governments between the 1989 election and the 1993 election, after which the "post-communist" left-wing parties took over. In 1993, the formerly Soviet Northern Group of Forces, a vestige of past domination, left Poland.

In 1995, Aleksander Kwaśniewski of the Social Democratic Party was elected president and remained in that capacity for the next ten years (two terms).

In 1997, the new Constitution of Poland was finalized and approved in a referendum; it replaced the Small Constitution of 1992, an amended version of the communist constitution.

Poland joined NATO in 1999. Elements of the Polish Armed Forces have since participated in the Iraq War and the War in Afghanistan (2001–2021). Poland joined the European Union as part of its enlargement in 2004. However, Poland has not adopted the euro as its currency and legal tender, but instead uses the Polish złoty.

In April 2010, Polish president Lech Kaczynski and dozens of the country's top political and military leaders died in the Smolensk air disaster.

After the election of the far-right conservative Law and Justice party in 2015, the Polish government repeatedly clashed with EU institutions on the issue of judicial reform and was accused by the European Commission and the European Parliament of undermining "European Values" and eroding democratic standards. However, the Polish government headed by the Law and Justice party maintained that the reforms were necessary due to the prevalence of corruption within the Polish judiciary and the continued presence of holdover Communist era judges.

In October 2019, Poland's governing Law and Justice party (PiS) won parliamentary election, keeping its majority in the lower house. The second was centrist Civic Coalition (KO). The government of Prime Minister Mateusz Morawiecki continued. However, PiS leader Jarosław Kaczyński was considered the most powerful political figure in Poland although not a member of government. In July 2020, President Andrzej Duda, supported by PiS, was re-elected.

Poland was one of neighbouring Ukraine's most ardent supporters after the 2022 Russian invasion of Ukraine. As of November 2022, Poland had received more than 1.5 million Ukrainian refugees since the beginning of the war. In September 2023, however, Poland said that it would stop supplying arms to Ukraine and instead focus on its own defense. Poland's decision to ban importing Ukrainian grain, in order to protect its own farmers, had caused tension between the two countries.

In October 2023, the ruling Law and Justice (PiS) party won the largest share of the vote in the election, but lost its majority in parliament. In December 2023, Donald Tusk became the new Prime Minister to succeed Morawiecki, leading a coalition of three parliamentary groups made up of Civic Coalition, Third Way, and The Left. Law and Justice became the leading opposition party.

Tensions between Poland and its eastern neighbour, Belarus, reached a new high in June 2024 when Belarus, who had encouraged masses of illegal immigrants to cross the Polish border on foot as part of the undeclared dirty tricks campaign of its CSTO ally Russia, created the conditions in which a Polish border ground was stabbed to death by a would-be immigrant. The Polish state soon tightened controls of its frontier and on 27 July 2024 the Sejm passed a law which liberalized the use of firearms by border patrols.

In June 2025 election, Karol Nawrocki, candidate of the national conservative Law and Justice (PiS), was elected Poland's new president.

== See also ==
- Historia narodu polskiego
- History of Europe
- History of the Jews in Poland
- List of Polish monarchs
- List of heads of state of Poland
- List of prime ministers of Poland
- History of the Polish Army
- Polish hussars
- Politics of Poland
- History of archaeological research in Poland

== Notes ==
a. Piłsudski's family roots in the Polonized gentry of the Grand Duchy of Lithuania and the resulting perspective of seeing himself and people like him as legitimate Lithuanians put him in conflict with modern Lithuanian nationalists (who in Piłsudski's lifetime redefined the scope and meaning of the "Lithuanian" identity), and, by extension, with other nationalists including the Polish modern nationalist movement.

b. In 1938, Poland and Romania refused to agree to a Franco-British proposal that in the event of war with Nazi Germany, Soviet forces would be allowed to cross their territories to aid Czechoslovakia. The Polish ruling elites considered the Soviets in some ways more threatening than the Nazis.

The Soviet Union repeatedly declared its intention to fulfill its obligations under the 1935 treaty with Czechoslovakia and defend Czechoslovakia militarily. A transfer of land and air forces through Poland and/or Romania was required, and the Soviets approached the French, who also had a treaty with Czechoslovakia (and with Poland and with the Soviet Union). Edward Rydz-Śmigły rebuked the French suggestion on that matter in 1936, and in 1938 Józef Beck pressured Romania not to allow even Soviet warplanes to fly over its territory. Like Hungary, Poland was looking into using the German-Czechoslovak conflict to settle its own territorial grievances, namely disputes over parts of Trans-Olza, Spiš and Orava.

c. In October 1939, the British Foreign Office notified the Soviets that the United Kingdom would be satisfied with a postwar creation of small ethnic Poland, patterned after the Duchy of Warsaw. An establishment of Poland restricted to "minimal size", according to ethnographic boundaries (such as the lands common to both the prewar Poland and postwar Poland), was planned by the Soviet People's Commissariat for Foreign Affairs in 1943–1944. Such territorial reduction was recommended by Ivan Maisky to Vyacheslav Molotov in early 1944, because of what Maisky saw as Poland's historically unfriendly disposition toward Russia and the Soviet Union, likely in some way to continue. Joseph Stalin opted for a larger version, allowing a "swap" (territorial compensation for Poland), which involved the eastern lands gained by Poland at the Peace of Riga of 1921 and now lost, and eastern Germany conquered from the Nazis in 1944–1945. In regard to the several major disputed areas: Lower Silesia west of the Oder and the Eastern Neisse rivers (the British wanted it to remain a part of the future German state), Stettin (in 1945 the German communists already established their administration there), "Zakerzonia" (western Red Ruthenia demanded by the Ukrainians), and the Białystok region (Białystok was claimed by the communists of the Byelorussian SSR), the Soviet leader made decisions that favored Poland.

Other territorial and ethnic scenarios were also possible, generally with possible outcomes less advantageous to Poland than the form the country assumed.

d. Timothy D. Snyder spoke of about 100,000 Jews killed by Poles during the Nazi occupation, the majority probably by members of the collaborationist Blue Police. This number would have likely been many times higher had Poland entered into an alliance with Germany in 1939, as advocated by some Polish historians and others.

e. Some may have falsely claimed the Jewish identity hoping for permission to emigrate. The communist authorities, pursuing the concept of Poland of single ethnicity (in accordance with the recent border changes and expulsions), were allowing the Jews to leave the country. For a discussion of early communist Poland's ethnic politics, see Timothy D. Snyder, The Reconstruction of Nations, chapters on modern "Ukrainian Borderland".

f. A Communist Party of Poland had existed in the past, but was eliminated in Stalin's purges in 1938.

g. The Soviet leadership, which had previously ordered the crushing of the Uprising of 1953 in East Germany, the Hungarian Revolution of 1956 and the Prague Spring in 1968, in late 1970 became worried about potential demoralizing effects that deployment against Polish workers would have on the Polish army, a crucial Warsaw Pact component. The Soviets withdrew their support for Gomułka, who insisted on the use of force; he and his close associates were subsequently ousted from the Polish Politburo by the Polish Central Committee.

h. East of the Molotov-Ribbentrop line, the population was 43% Polish, 33% Ukrainian, 8% Belarusian and 8% Jewish. The Soviet Union did not want to appear as an aggressor, and moved its troops to eastern Poland under the pretext of offering protection to "the kindred Ukrainian and Belorussian people".

i. Joseph Stalin at the 1943 Tehran Conference discussed with Winston Churchill and Franklin D. Roosevelt new post-war borders in central-eastern Europe, including the shape of a future Poland. He endorsed the Piast Concept, which justified a massive shift of Poland's frontiers to the west. Stalin resolved to secure and stabilize the western reaches of the Soviet Union and disable the future military potential of Germany by constructing a compact and ethnically defined Poland (along with the Soviet ethnic Ukraine, Belarus and Lithuania) and by radically altering the region's system of national borders. After 1945, the Polish communist regime wholeheartedly adopted and promoted the Piast Concept, making it the centerpiece of their claim to be the true inheritors of Polish nationalism. After all the killings and population transfers during and after the war, the country was 99% "Polish".

j. "All the currently available documents of Nazi administration show that, together with the Jews, the stratum of the Polish intelligentsia was marked for total extermination. In fact, Nazi Germany achieved this goal almost by half, since Poland lost 50 percent of her citizens with university diplomas and 35 percent of those with a gimnazium diploma." According to Brzoza and Sowa, 450,000 of Polish citizens had completed higher, secondary, or trade school education by the outbreak of the war. 37.5% of people with higher education perished, 30% of those with general secondary education, and 53.3% of trade school graduates.

k. Decisive political events took place in Poland shortly before the Hungarian Revolution of 1956. Władysław Gomułka, a reformist party leader, was reinstated to the Politburo of the PZPR and the Eighth Plenum of its Central Committee was announced to convene on 19 October 1956, all without seeking a Soviet approval. The Soviet Union responded with military moves and intimidation and its "military-political delegation", led by Nikita Khrushchev, quickly arrived in Warsaw. Gomułka tried to convince them of his loyalty but insisted on the reforms that he considered essential, including a replacement of Poland's Soviet-trusted minister of defense, Konstantin Rokossovsky. The disconcerted Soviets returned to Moscow, the PZPR Plenum elected Gomułka first secretary and removed Rokossovsky from the Politburo. On 21 October, the Soviet Presidium followed Khrushchev's lead and decided unanimously to "refrain from military intervention" in Poland, a decision likely influenced also by the ongoing preparations for the invasion of Hungary. The Soviet gamble paid off, because Gomułka in the coming years turned out to be a very dependable Soviet ally and an orthodox communist.

However, unlike the other Warsaw Pact countries, Poland did not endorse the Soviet armed intervention in Hungary. The Hungarian Revolution was intensely supported by the Polish public.

l. The delayed reinforcements were coming and the government military commanders General Tadeusz Rozwadowski and Władysław Anders wanted to keep on fighting the coup perpetrators, but President Stanisław Wojciechowski and the government decided to surrender to prevent the imminent spread of civil war. The coup brought to power the "Sanation" regime under Józef Piłsudski (Edward Rydz-Śmigły after Piłsudski's death). The Sanation regime persecuted the opposition within the military and in general. Rozwadowski died after abusive imprisonment, according to some accounts murdered. Another major opponent of Piłsudski, General Włodzimierz Zagórski, disappeared in 1927. According to Aleksandra Piłsudska, the marshal's wife, following the coup and for the rest of his life Piłsudski lost his composure and appeared over-burdened.

At the time of Rydz-Śmigły's command, the Sanation camp embraced the ideology of Roman Dmowski, Piłsudski's nemesis. Rydz-Śmigły did not allow General Władysław Sikorski, an enemy of the Sanation movement, to participate as a soldier in the country's defense against the Invasion of Poland in September 1939. During World War II in France and then in Britain, the Polish government-in-exile became dominated by anti-Sanation politicians. The perceived Sanation followers were in turn persecuted (in exile) under prime ministers Sikorski and Stanisław Mikołajczyk.

m. General Zygmunt Berling of the Soviet-allied First Polish Army attempted in mid-September a crossing of the Vistula and landing at Czerniaków to aid the insurgents, but the operation was defeated by the Germans and the Poles suffered heavy losses.

n. The decision to launch the Warsaw Uprising resulted in the destruction of the city, its population and its elites and has been a source of lasting controversy. According to the historians Czesław Brzoza and Andrzej Leon Sowa, orders of further military offensives, issued at the end of August 1944 as a continuation of Operation Tempest, show a loss of the sense of responsibility for the country's fate on the part of the underground Polish leadership.

o. One of the party leaders Mieczysław Rakowski, who abandoned his mentor Gomułka following the 1970 crisis, saw the demands of the demonstrating workers as "exclusively socialist" in character, because of the way they were phrased. Most people in communist Poland, including opposition activists, did not question the supremacy of socialism or the socialist idea; misconduct by party officials, such as not following the provisions of the constitution, was blamed. From the time of Gierek, this assumed standard of political correctness was increasingly challenged: pluralism, and then free market, became frequently used concepts.

p. The Polish Sanation authorities were provoked by the independence-seeking Organization of Ukrainian Nationalists (OUN). OUN engaged in political assassinations, terror and sabotage, to which the Polish state responded with a repressive campaign in the 1930s, as Józef Piłsudski and his successors imposed collective responsibility on the villagers in the affected areas. After the disturbances of 1933 and 1934, the Bereza Kartuska prison camp was established; it became notorious for its brutal regime. The government brought Polish settlers and administrators to parts of Volhynia with a centuries-old tradition of Ukrainian peasant rising against Polish land owners (and to Eastern Galicia). In the late 1930s, after Piłsudski's death, military persecution intensified and a policy of "national assimilation" was aggressively pursued. Military raids, public beatings, property confiscations and the closing and destruction of Orthodox churches aroused lasting enmity in Galicia and antagonized Ukrainian society in Volhynia at the worst possible moment, according to Timothy D. Snyder. However, he also notes that "Ukrainian terrorism and Polish reprisals touched only part of the population, leaving vast regions unaffected" and "the OUN's nationalist prescription, a Ukrainian state for ethnic Ukrainians alone was far from popular". Halik Kochanski wrote of the legacy of bitterness between the Ukrainians and Poles that soon exploded in the context of World War II. See also: History of the Ukrainian minority in Poland.

q. In Poland, officials of central government (the provincial office of wojewoda) can overrule elected territorial and municipal local governments. However, in such cases wojewoda decisions have sometimes been invalidated by courts.

r. Foreign policy was one of the few governmental areas in which Piłsudski took an active interest. He saw Poland's role and opportunity as lying in Eastern Europe and advocated passive relations with the West. He felt that a German attack should not be feared, because even if this unlikely event were to take place, the Western powers would be bound to restrain Germany and come to Poland's rescue.

s. According to the researcher Jan Sowa, the Commonwealth failed as a state because it was not able to conform to the emerging new European order established at the Peace of Westphalia of 1648. Poland's elective kings, restricted by the self-serving and short-sighted nobility, could not impose a strong and efficient central government with its characteristic post-Westphalian internal and external sovereignty. The inability of Polish kings to levy and collect taxes (and therefore sustain a standing army) and conduct independent foreign policy were among the chief obstacles to Poland competing effectively on the changed European scene, where absolutist power was a prerequisite for survival and became the foundation for the abolition of serfdom and gradual formation of parliamentarism.

t. Besides the Home Army there were other major underground fighting formations: Bataliony Chłopskie, National Armed Forces (NSZ) and Gwardia Ludowa (later Armia Ludowa). From 1943, the leaders of the nationalistic NSZ collaborated with Nazi Germany in a case unique in occupied Poland. The NSZ conducted an anti-communist civil war. Before the arrival of the Soviets, the NSZ's Holy Cross Mountains Brigade left Poland under the protection of the German army. According to the historians Czesław Brzoza and Andrzej Leon Sowa, participation figures given for the underground resistance are often inflated. In the spring of 1944, the time of the most extensive involvement of the underground organizations, there were most likely considerably fewer than 500,000 military and civilian personnel participating, over the entire spectrum, from the right wing to the communists.

u. According to Jerzy Eisler, about 1.1 million people may have been imprisoned or detained in 1944–1956 and about 50,000 may have died because of the struggle and persecution, including about 7,000 soldiers of the right-wing underground killed in the 1940s. According to Adam Leszczyński, up to 30,000 people were killed by the communist regime during the first several years after the war.

v. According to Andrzej Stelmachowski, one of the key participants of the Polish systemic transformation, Minister Leszek Balcerowicz pursued extremely liberal economic policies, often extraordinarily painful for society. The December 1989 Sejm statute of credit relations reform introduced an "incredible" system of privileges for banks, which were allowed to unilaterally alter interest rates on already existing contracts. The exceedingly high rates they instantly introduced ruined many previously profitable enterprises and caused a complete breakdown of the apartment block construction industry, which had long-term deleterious effects on the state budget as well. Balcerowicz's policies also caused permanent damage to Polish agriculture, an area in which he lacked expertise, and to the often successful and useful Polish cooperative movement.

According to Karol Modzelewski, a dissident and critic of the economic transformation, in 1989 Solidarity no longer existed, having been in reality eliminated during the martial law period. What the "post-Solidarity elites" did in 1989 amounted to a betrayal of the old Solidarity base, and the retribution was only a matter of time.

w. Led by Władysław Anders, the Polish II Corps fought in 1944–1945 in the Allied Italian Campaign, where the corps' main engagement was the Battle of Monte Cassino.

x. The Piast Concept, of which the chief proponent was Jan Ludwik Popławski (late 19th century), was based on the claim that the Piast homeland was inhabited by so-called "native" aboriginal Slavs and Slavonic Poles since time immemorial and only later was "infiltrated" by "alien" Celts, Germanic peoples, and others. After 1945, the so-called "autochthonous" or "aboriginal" school of Polish prehistory received official backing and a considerable degree of popular support in Poland. According to this view, the Lusatian Culture, which flourished between the Oder and the Vistula in the early Iron Age, was said to be Slavonic; all non-Slavonic tribes and peoples recorded in the area at various points in ancient times were dismissed as "migrants" and "visitors". In contrast, the critics of this theory, such as Marija Gimbutas, regarded it as an unproved hypotheses and for them the date and origin of the westward migration of the Slavs were largely uncharted; the Slavonic connections of the Lusatian Culture were entirely imaginary; and the presence of an ethnically mixed and constantly changing collection of peoples on the North European Plain was taken for granted.

y. According to the count presented by Prime Minister and Internal Affairs Minister Felicjan Sławoj Składkowski before the Sejm committee in January 1938, 818 people were killed in police suppression of labor protests (industrial and agricultural) during the 1932–1937 period.

z. John II Casimir Vasa is known for his remarkable and accurate prediction of the Partitions of Poland, made over a century before the event's occurrence.

a1. According to war historian Ben Macintyre, "The Polish contribution to allied victory in the Second World War was extraordinary, perhaps even decisive, but for many years it was disgracefully played down, obscured by the politics of the Cold War."

b1. Piłsudski left the Polish Socialist Party in 1914 and severed his connections with the socialist movement, but many activists from the Left and of other political orientations presumed his continuing involvement there.

c1. Woodrow Wilson's Fourteen Points program was subsequently weakened by internal developments in the US, Britain, France, and Germany. In the last case, Poland was denied the city of Danzig on the Baltic coast.

d1. The government of Soviet Russia issued in August 1918 a decree strongly supportive of the independence of Poland, but at that time no Polish lands were under Russian control.

== Bibliography ==
Academic journals

More recent general history of Poland books in English

- Biskupski, M. B. (2000). The History of Poland. Greenwood. Archived from the original on February 13, 2008 – via Questia.
- Dabrowski, Patrice M. Poland: The First Thousand Years. Northern Illinois University Press, 2016. 506 pp. ISBN 978-0875807560
- Frucht, Richard (2000). Encyclopedia of Eastern Europe: From the Congress of Vienna to the Fall of Communism. Garland Pub. Archived from the original on March 18, 2010 – via Questia.
- Halecki, Oskar. History of Poland, New York: Roy Publishers, 1942. New York: Barnes and Noble, 1993, ISBN 0-679-51087-7
- Kenney, Padraic. "After the Blank Spots Are Filled: Recent Perspectives on Modern Poland," Journal of Modern History Volume 79, Number 1, March 2007 pp 134–61, historiography
- Kieniewicz, Stefan. History of Poland, Hippocrene Books, 1982, ISBN 0-88254-695-3
- Kloczowski, Jerzy. A History of Polish Christianity. Cambridge U. Pr., 2000. 385 pp.
- Lerski, George J. (1996). Historical Dictionary of Poland, 966–1945. Greenwood. Archived from the original on February 13, 2008 – via Questia.
- Leslie, R. F. et al. The History of Poland since 1863. Cambridge U. Press, 1980. 494 pp.
- Lewinski-Corwin, Edward Henry. The Political History of Poland (1917), well-illustrated; 650pp online at books.google.com
- Litwin Henryk, Central European Superpower, BUM , 2016.
- Pogonowski, Iwo Cyprian. Poland: An Illustrated History, New York: Hippocrene Books, 2000, ISBN 0-7818-0757-3
- Pogonowski, Iwo Cyprian. Poland: A Historical Atlas. Hippocrene, 1987. 321 pp.
- Radzilowski, John. A Traveller's History of Poland, Northampton, Massachusetts: Interlink Books, 2007, ISBN 1-56656-655-X
- Reddaway, W. F.; Penson, J. H.; Halecki, O.; Dyboski, R. (1971) [1941]. Reddaway, W. F.; Penson, J. H.; Halecki, O.; Dyboski, R. (eds.). The Cambridge History of Poland. Cambridge University Press. Archived from the original on February 13, 2008 – via Questia.
- Roos, Hans. A History of Modern Poland (1966)
- Sanford, George. Historical Dictionary of Poland. Scarecrow Press, 2003. 291 pp.
- Wróbel, Piotr. Historical Dictionary of Poland, 1945–1996. Greenwood, 1998. 397 pp.
- Zamoyski, Adam. Poland: A History. Hippocrene Books, 2012. 426 pp. ISBN 978-0781813013

Published in Poland

- History of Poland, Aleksander Gieysztor et al. Warsaw: PWN, 1968
- History of Poland, Stefan Kieniewicz et al. Warsaw: PWN, 1979
- An Outline History of Poland, by Jerzy Topolski. Warsaw: Interpress Publishers, 1986, ISBN 83-223-2118-X
- An Illustrated History of Poland, by Dariusz Banaszak, Tomasz Biber, Maciej Leszczyński. Poznań: Publicat, 2008, ISBN 978-83-245-1587-5
- Poland: History of Poland, by Stanisław Kołodziejski, Roman Marcinek, Jakub Polit. Kraków: Wydawnictwo Ryszard Kluszczyński, 2005, 2009, ISBN 83-7447-018-6
