= Ludwik Gorzkowski =

Polish politician, physicist and revolutionary activist

- Born: 21 November 1811; Kraków
- Died: 1857 (aged 45–46)
- Occupations: politician physicist revolutionary activist

Ludwik Jędrzej Gorzkowski (1811–1857) was a Polish politician, physicist and revolutionary activist, one of the organizers of the Kraków uprising, during which he was a member of the newly formed Polish National Government alongside Jan Tyssowski and Aleksander Grzegorzewski.

== Life ==
Gorzkowski was born on 21 November 1811 in Kraków. He studied mathematics and physics at the University of Kraków and received his doctorate in 1835.

A physicist by profession, he cooperated with the Poznań Centralization of the Polish Democratic Society, and maintained contacts with Edward Dembowski . He co-authored the plan of the Kraków uprising in 1846 and the project of the composition of the provisional Polish National Government, in which he was to represent the Free City of Cracow. After the arrests of the conspirators in Greater Poland, he did not give up plans for the uprising and joined the National Government together with Jan Tyssowski, Aleksander Grzegorzewski and Karol Rogawski.
