= Western Ukraine =

Western territories of Ukraine

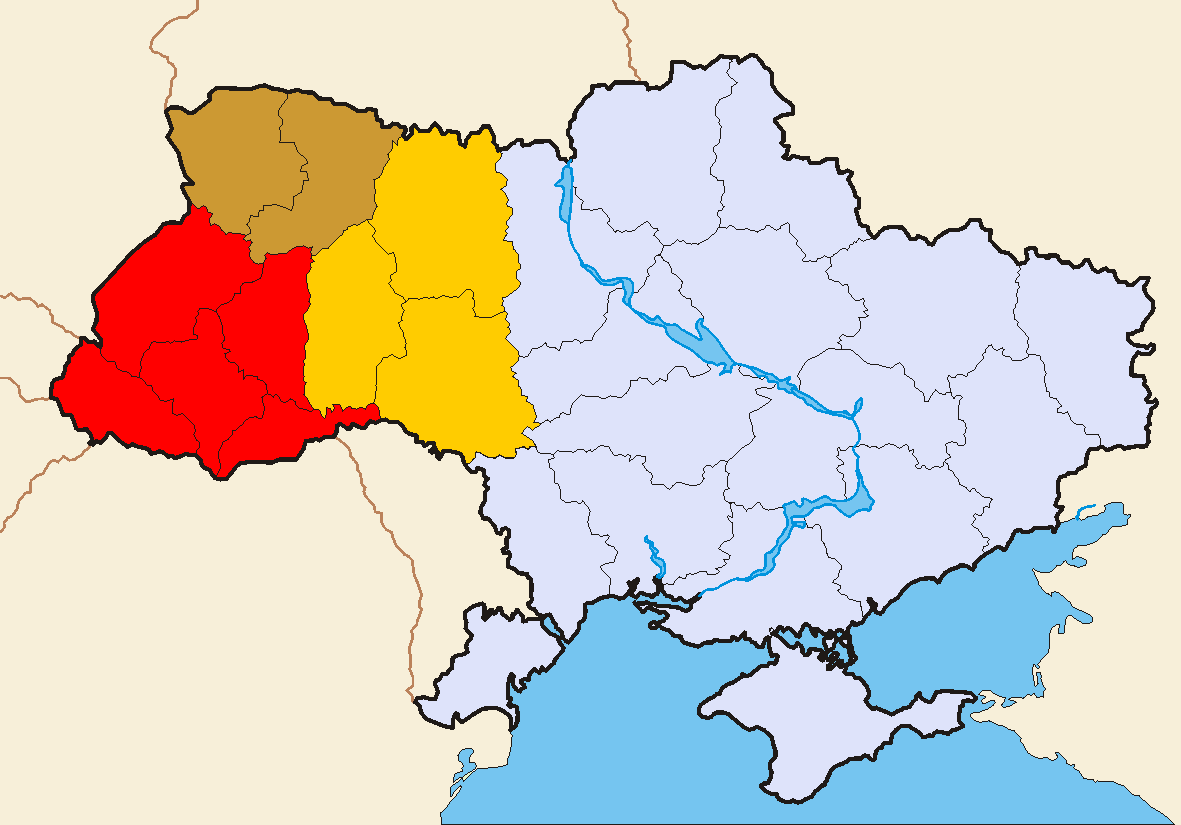
- Colours meanings: always included often included sometimes included
- Area
  - Coordinates: 50°N 26°E
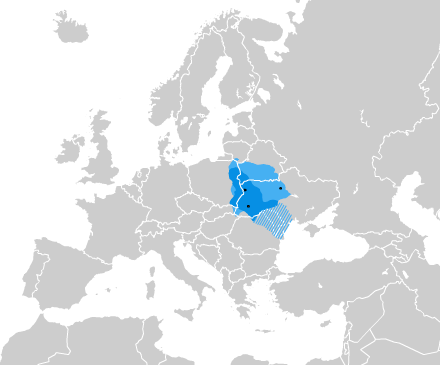
- Map of the Kingdom of Galicia–Volhynia in the 13th/14th century

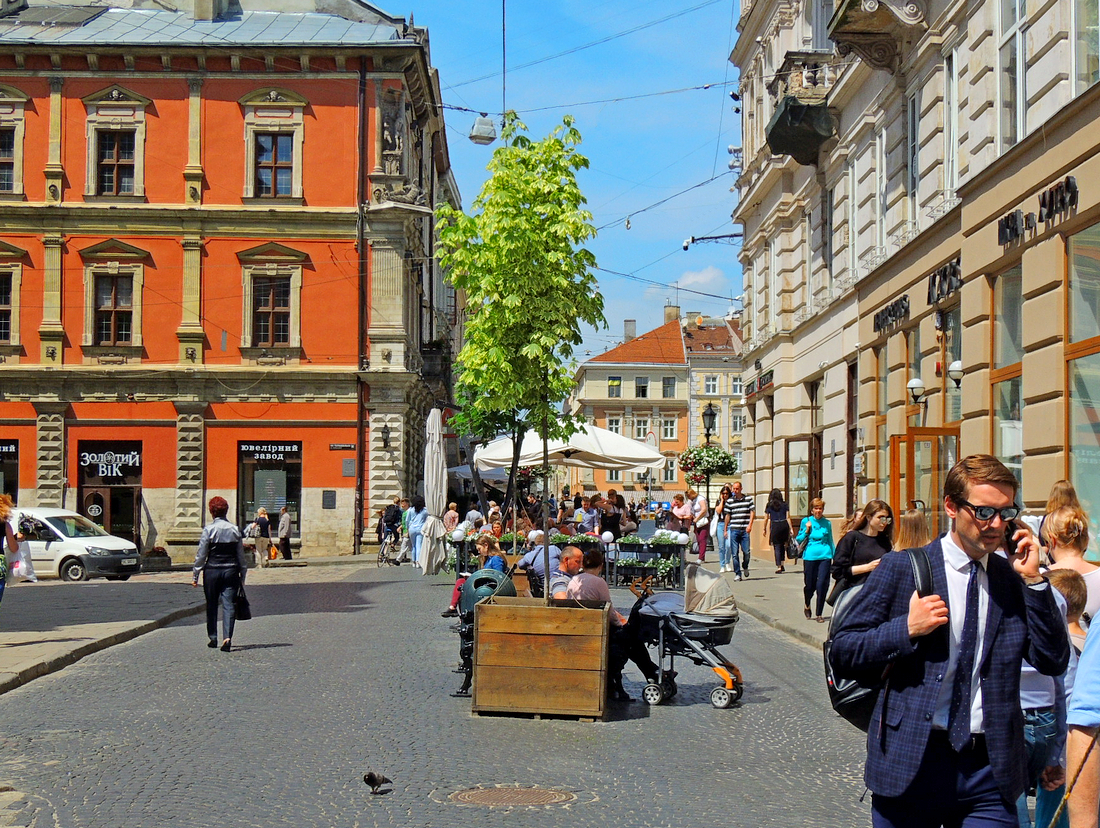
Old Town of Lviv, the capital of the Kingdom of Galicia–Volhynia from 1272 to 1349 and nowadays, the most populated city of Western Ukraine

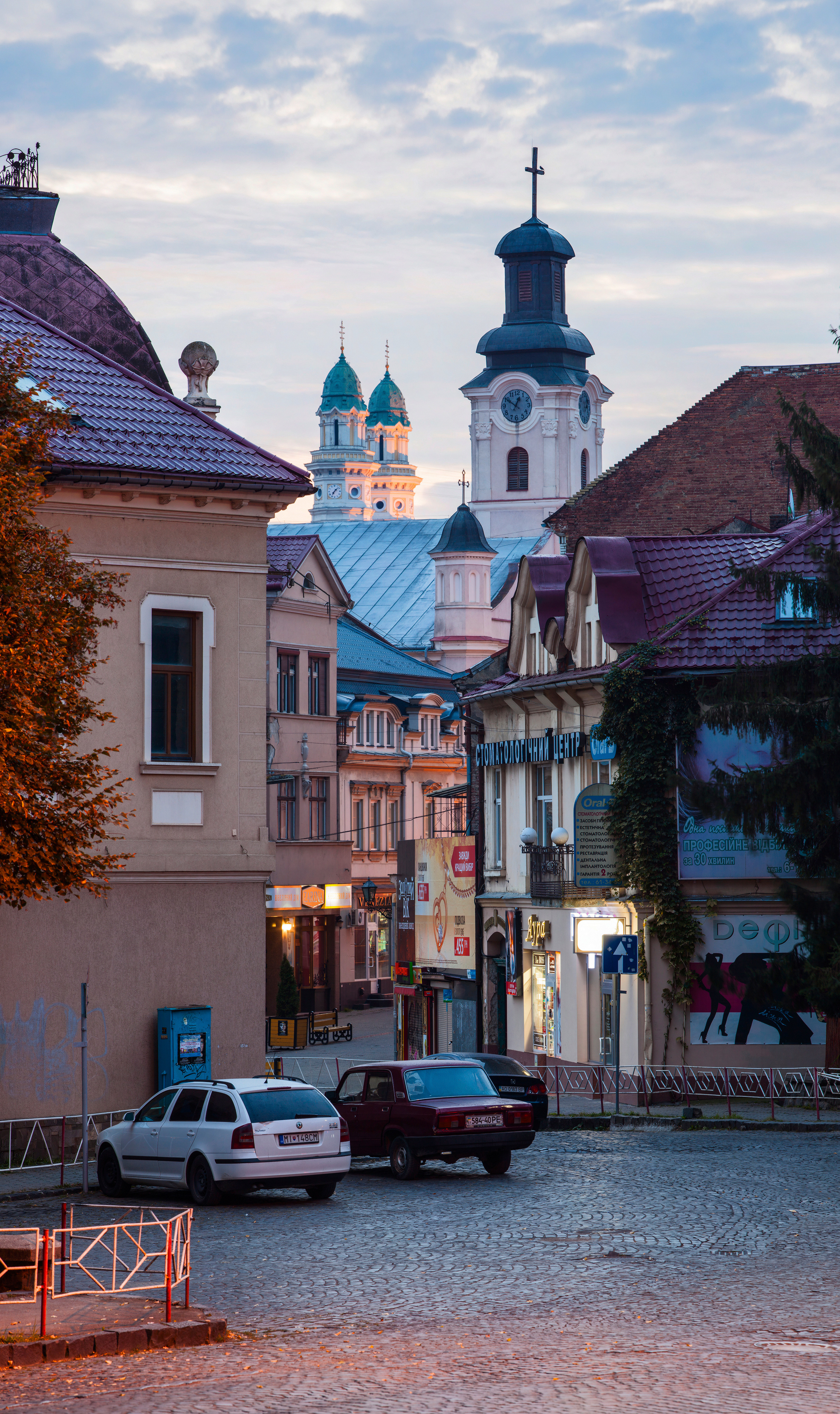
Old city and Catholic churches in Uzhhorod, showing the influence of Western Christianity on Western Ukraine

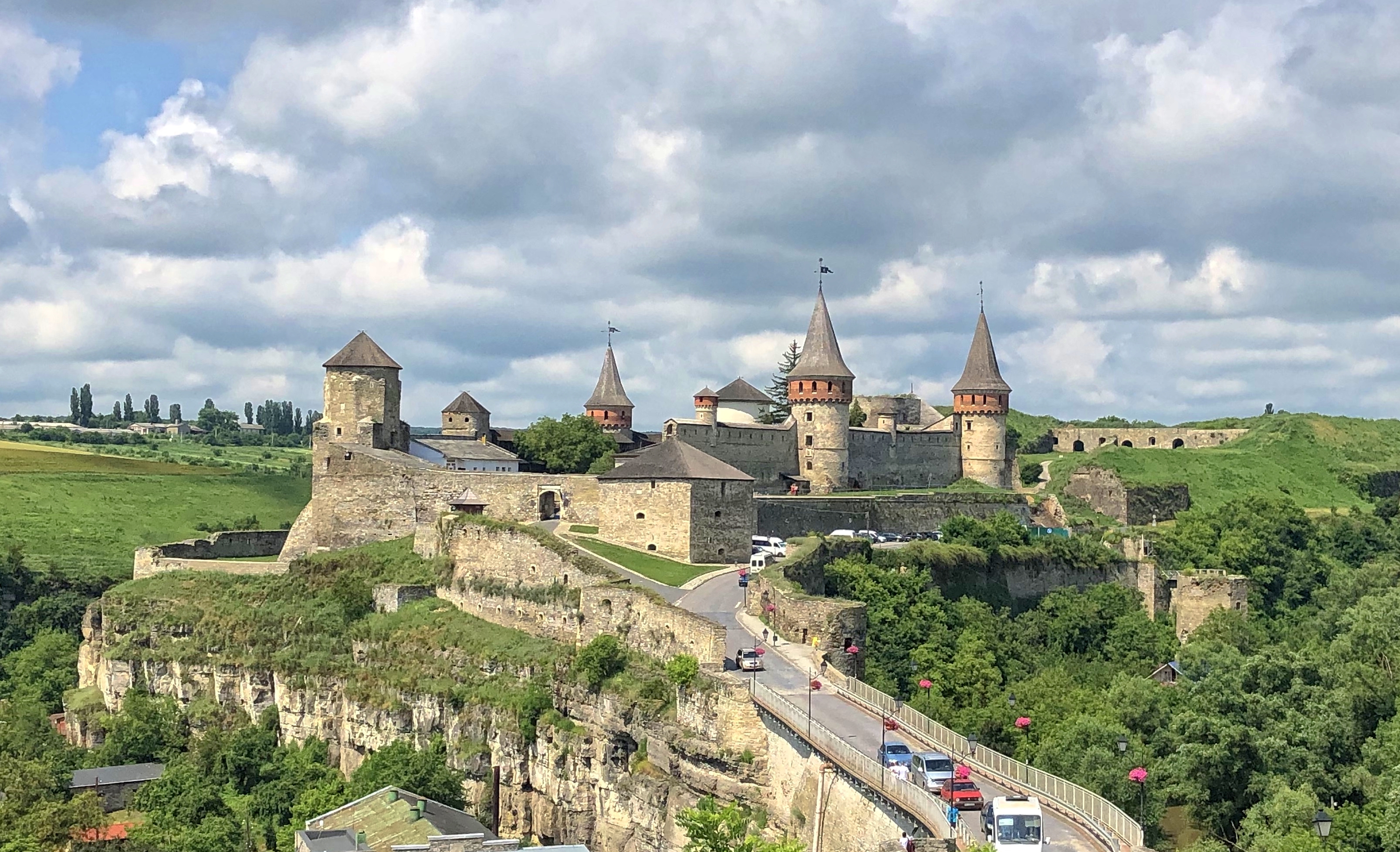
Fortress of Kamianets, a former Ruthenian-Lithuanian castle and a later three-part Polish fortress

Western Ukraine or West Ukraine (Ukrainian: Західна Україна, romanized: Zakhidna Ukrayina, IPA: [ˈzɑxidnɐ ʊkrɐˈjinɐ]) refers to the western territories of Ukraine. There is no universally accepted definition of the territory's boundaries, but the contemporary Ukrainian administrative regions (oblasts) of Chernivtsi, Ivano-Frankivsk, Lviv, Ternopil and Zakarpattia (which were part of the former Austro-Hungarian Empire) are typically included. In addition, Volyn and Rivne oblasts (parts of the territory annexed from the Polish–Lithuanian Commonwealth during its Third Partition) are also usually included. In modern sources, Khmelnytskyi Oblast is often included because of its geographical, linguistic and cultural association with Western Ukraine, although this cannot be confirmed from a historical and political point of view. It includes several historical regions such as Carpathian Ruthenia, Halychyna including Pokuttia (the eastern portion of Eastern Galicia), most of Volhynia, northern Bukovina and the Hertsa region, and Podolia. Western Ukraine is sometimes considered to include areas of eastern Volhynia, Podolia, and the small northern portion of Bessarabia.

The area of Western Ukraine was ruled by various polities, including the Principality of Galicia–Volhynia, which became part of the Polish–Lithuanian Commonwealth, but also the Kingdom of Hungary and Principality of Moldavia; it would then variously come under rule of the Austrian Empire, Austria-Hungary, the Second Polish Republic, the Kingdom of Romania, and finally the Soviet Union (via the Ukrainian Soviet Socialist Republic) in 1939 and 1940 following the invasion of Poland and the Soviet occupation of Bessarabia and Northern Bukovina, with the borders finalized after the end of World War II. After the dissolution of the Soviet Union, it became part of the independent Ukrainian state.

Western Ukraine is known for its exceptional natural and cultural heritage, several sites of which are on the List of World Heritage. Architecturally, it includes the fortress of Kamianets, the Old Town of Lviv, the former Residence of Bukovinian and Dalmatian Metropolitans, the Tserkvas, the Khotyn Fortress and the Pochayiv Lavra. Its landscapes and natural sites also represent a major tourist asset for the region, combining the mountain landscapes of the Ukrainian Carpathians and those of the Podolian Upland. These include Mount Hoverla, the highest point in Ukraine, Optymistychna Cave, the largest in Europe, Bukovel Ski Resort, Synevyr National Park, Carpathian National Park or the Uzh National Nature Park protecting part of the primary forests included in the Carpathian Biosphere Reserve.

The city of Lviv is the main cultural center of the region and was the historical capital of the Kingdom of Galicia–Volhynia. Other important cities are Chernivtsi, Rivne, Ivano-Frankivsk, Ternopil, Lutsk, Khmelnytskyi and Uzhhorod.

== History ==
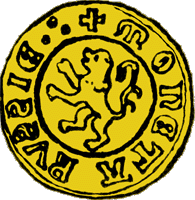
"Moneta Rvssiє" coined in 1382 based on groschen

Western Ukraine, takes its roots from the Kingdom of Galicia–Volhynia, a successor of Kievan Rus' formed in 1199 after the weakening of Kievan Rus' and attacks from the Golden Horde.

Following the 14th century Galicia–Volhynia Wars, most of the region was transferred to the Crown of Poland under Casimir the Great, who received the lands legally by a downward agreement in 1340 after his nephew's death, Bolesław-Jerzy II. The eastern Volhynia and most of Podolia was added to the territory of the Grand Duchy of Lithuania by Lubart.

The territory of Bukovina was part of Moldavia since its formation by voivode Dragoș, who was departed by the Kingdom of Hungary, during the 14th century.

The territory of Zakarpattya was the part of the Principality later Kingdom of Hungary, Austria Hungary, Czekhoslovakia from 9 till 20 century.

After the 18th century partitions of Poland (Polish–Lithuanian Commonwealth), the territory was split between the Habsburg monarchy and the Russian Empire. The modern south-western part of Western Ukraine became the Kingdom of Galicia and Lodomeria, after 1804 crownland of the Austrian Empire. Its northern flank with the cities of Lutsk and Rivne was acquired in 1795 by Imperial Russia following the third and final partition of Poland. Throughout its existence Russian Poland was marred with violence and intimidation, beginning with the 1794 massacres, imperial land-theft and the deportations of the November and January Uprisings. By contrast, the Austrian Partition with its Sejm of the Land in the cities of Lviv and Stanyslaviv (Ivano-Frankivsk) was freer politically perhaps because it had a lot less to offer economically. Imperial Austria did not persecute Ukrainian organizations. In 1846, the Austrian government used the peasant uprising to decimate Polish nobles, who were organising an uprising against Austria. In later years, Austria-Hungary de facto encouraged the existence of Ukrainian political organizations in order to counterbalance the influence of Polish culture in Galicia. The southern half of West Ukraine remained under Austrian administration until the collapse of the House of Habsburg at the end of World War One in 1918.

In 1775, following the Russo-Turkish Treaty of Küçük Kaynarca, Moldavia lost to the Habsburg monarchy its northwestern part, which became known as Bukovina, and remained under Austrian administration until 1918.

=== Interbellum and World War II ===
Following the defeat of Ukrainian People's Republic (1918) in the Soviet–Ukrainian War of 1921, Western Ukraine was partitioned by the Treaty of Riga between Poland, Czechoslovakia, Hungary, and the Soviet Russia acting on behalf of the Soviet Belarus and the Ukrainian Soviet Socialist Republic with capital in Kharkiv. The Soviet Union gained control over the entire territory of the short-lived Ukrainian People's Republic east of the border with Poland. In the Interbellum most of the territory of today's Western Ukraine belonged to the Second Polish Republic. Territories such as Bukovina and Carpatho-Ukraine belonged to Romania and Czechoslovakia, respectively.

At the onset of Operation Barbarossa by Nazi Germany, the region became occupied by Nazi Germany in 1941. The southern half of West Ukraine was incorporated into the semi-colonial Distrikt Galizien (District of Galicia) created on August 1, 1941 (Document No. 1997-PS of July 17, 1941 by Adolf Hitler) with headquarters in Chełm Lubelski, bordering district of General Government to the west. Its northern part (Volhynia) was assigned to the Reichskommissariat Ukraine formed in September 1941. Notably, the District of Galicia was a separate administrative unit from the actual Reichskommissariat Ukraine with capital in Rivne. They were not connected with each other politically for Nazi Germans. The division was administrative and conditional, in his book "From Putyvl to the Carpathian" Sydir Kovpak never mentioned about any border-like divisions. Bukovina was controlled by the Nazi-allied Kingdom of Romania.

=== Post-War ===
After the defeat of Germany in World War II, in May 1945 the Soviet Union incorporated all territories of current Western Ukraine into the Ukrainian SSR. Between 1944 and 1946, a population exchange between Poland and Soviet Ukraine occurred in which all ethnic Poles and Jews who had Polish citizenship before September 17, 1939 (date of the Soviet Invasion of Poland) were transferred to post-war Poland and all ethnic Ukrainians to the Ukrainian SSR, in accordance with the resolutions of the Yalta and Tehran conferences and the plans about the new Poland–Ukraine border.

==== Recent history ====
During the 2022 Russian invasion of Ukraine, Russia attacked Ukrainian military facility near the city of Lviv, in Western Ukraine with cruise missiles. Later in March Russia performed missile attacks on oil depots in Lviv, Dubno and Lutsk.

== Divisions ==
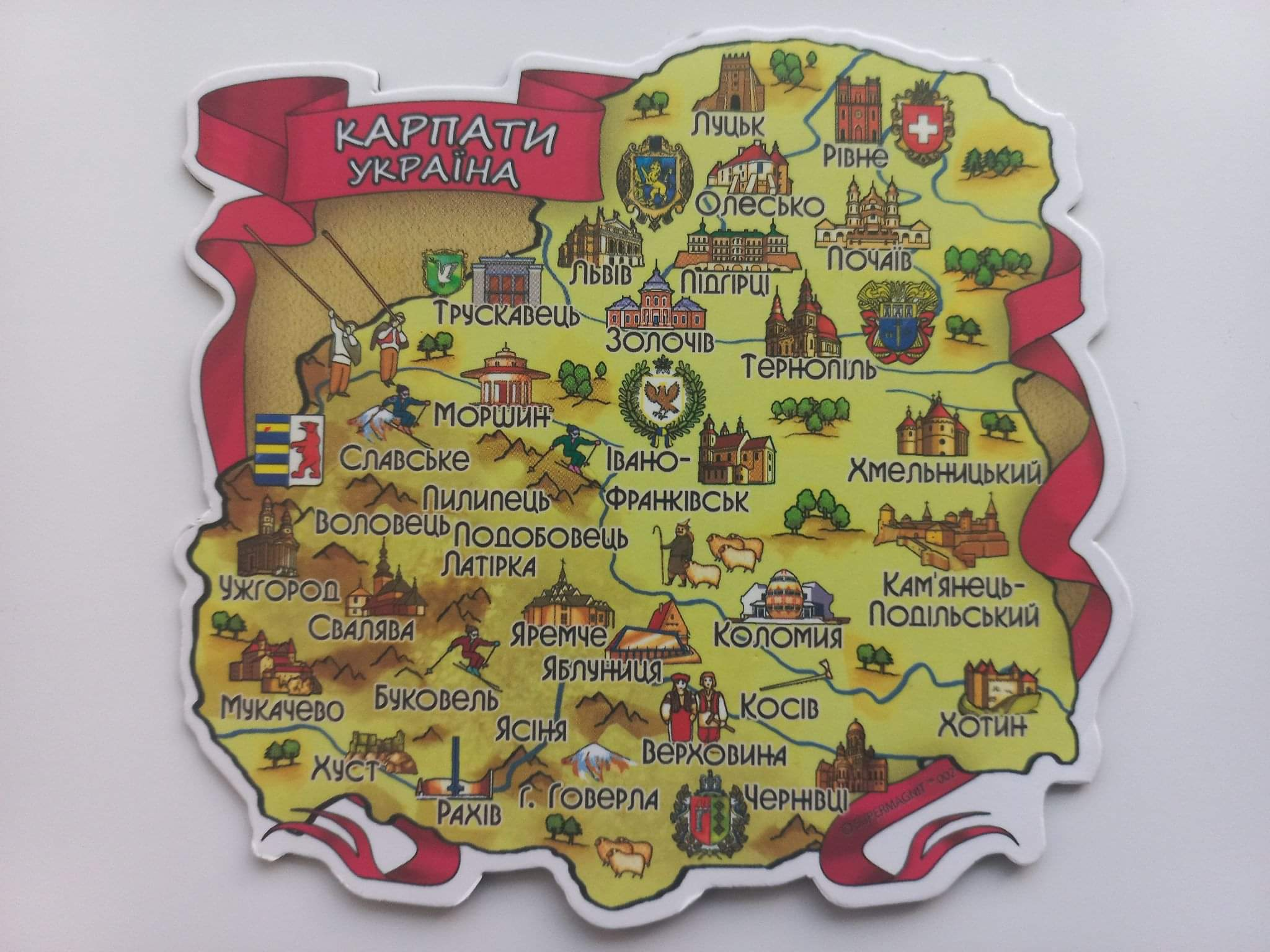
Souvenir from Bukovel

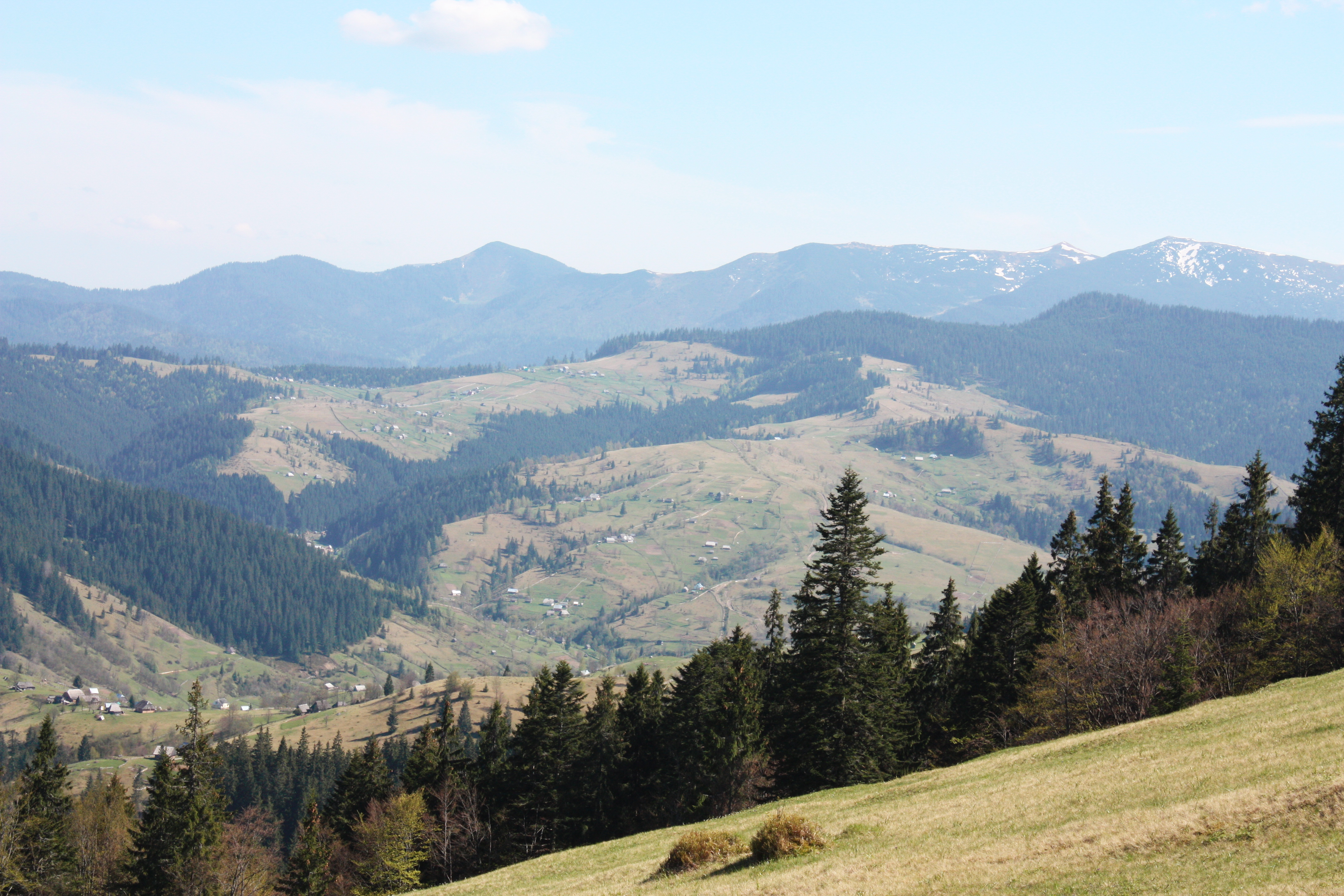
The Carpathians in the Zakarpattia Oblast are the highest mountain range in Ukraine

Western Ukraine includes such lands as Zakarpattia, Volyn, Halychyna (Prykarpattia, Pokuttia), Bukovina, Polissia, and Podillia.

The history of Western Ukraine is closely associated with the history of the following lands:

- Easternmost Bukovina, historical region of Central Europe in official use since 1775, controlled by the Kingdom of Romania after World War I, and half of it ceded to the USSR in 1940 (reconfirmed by Paris Peace Treaties, 1947)
- Eastern Galicia (Ukrainian: Halychyna), once a small kingdom with Lodomeria (1914), province of the Austrian Empire until the dissolution of Austria-Hungary in 1918. See also: crownland of the Kingdom of Galicia and Lodomeria
- Red Ruthenia since medieval times in the area known today as Eastern Galicia.
- West Ukrainian People's Republic declared in late 1918 until early 1919 and claiming half of Galicia with mostly Polish city dwellers (historical sense).
- Carpatho-Ukraine region within Czechoslovakia (1939) under Hungarian control until the Nazi occupation of Hungary in 1944.
- General Government of Galicia and Bukovina captured from Austria-Hungary during World War I.
- Ținutul Suceava (Kingdom of Romania)
- Volhynia, historic region straddling Poland, Ukraine, and Belarus to the north. The alternate name for the region today is Lodomeria after the city of Volodymyr. See also: Polish unofficial term Kresy (Borderlands, 1918–1939) that includes the West Belarus as well as Volhynia.
- Zakarpattia or Carpathian Ruthenia presently in the Zakarpattia Oblast of western Ukraine.

=== Administrative and historical divisions ===
Administrative region	Area sq km	Population (2001 Census)	Population Estimate (Jan 2012)
Chernivtsi Oblast	8,097	922,817	905,264
Ivano-Frankivsk Oblast	13,927	1,409,760	1,380,128
Khmelnytskyi Oblast	20,629	1,430,775	1,320,171
Lviv Oblast	21,831	2,626,543	2,540,938
Rivne Oblast	20,051	1,173,304	1,154,256
Ternopil Oblast	13,824	1,142,416	1,080,431
Volyn Oblast	20,144	1,060,694	1,038,598
Zakarpattia Oblast	12,753	1,258,264	1,250,759
Total	131,256	10,101,756	9,765,281

== Cultural characteristics ==
=== Differences with rest of Ukraine ===
"Perhaps, if Ukraine did not have its western regions, with Lviv at the centre, it would be easy to turn the country into another Belarus. But Galicia (Halychyna) and Bukovina, which became part of Soviet Ukraine under the Molotov–Ribbentrop Pact, brought to the country a rebellious and free spirit."

— Andrey Kurkov in an opinion piece about Euromaidan on BBC News Online (28 January 2014)

Ukrainian is the dominant language in the region. Back in the schools of the Ukrainian SSR learning Russian was mandatory; currently, in modern Ukraine, in schools with Ukrainian as the language of instruction, classes in Russian and in other minority languages are offered.

In terms of religion, the majority of adherents share the Byzantine Rite of Christianity as in the rest of Ukraine, but due to the region escaping the 1920s and 1930s Soviet persecution, a notably greater church adherence and belief in religion's role in society is present. Due to the complex post-independence religious confrontation of several church groups and their adherents, the historical influence played a key role in shaping the present loyalty of Western Ukraine's faithful. In Galician provinces, the Ukrainian Greek Catholic Church has the strongest following in the country, and the largest share of property and faithful. In the remaining regions: Volhynia, Bukovina and Transcarpathia the Orthodoxy is prevalent. Outside of Western Ukraine the greatest in terms of Church property, clergy, and according to some estimates, faithful, is the Ukrainian Orthodox Church (Moscow Patriarchate). In the listed regions (and in particular among the Orthodox faithful in Galicia), this position is notably weaker, as the main rivals, the Ukrainian Orthodox Church – Kyiv Patriarchate and the Ukrainian Autocephalous Orthodox Church, have a far greater influence. Within the lands of the Ukrainian Greek Catholic Church, the largest Eastern Catholic Church, priests' children often became priests and married within their social group, establishing a tightly-knit hereditary caste.

Noticeable cultural differences in the region (compared with the rest of Ukraine especially Southern Ukraine and Eastern Ukraine) are more "negative views" on the Russian language and on Joseph Stalin and more "positive views" on Ukrainian nationalism. A higher percentage of voters in Western Ukraine supported Ukrainian independence in the 1991 Ukrainian independence referendum than in the rest of the country.

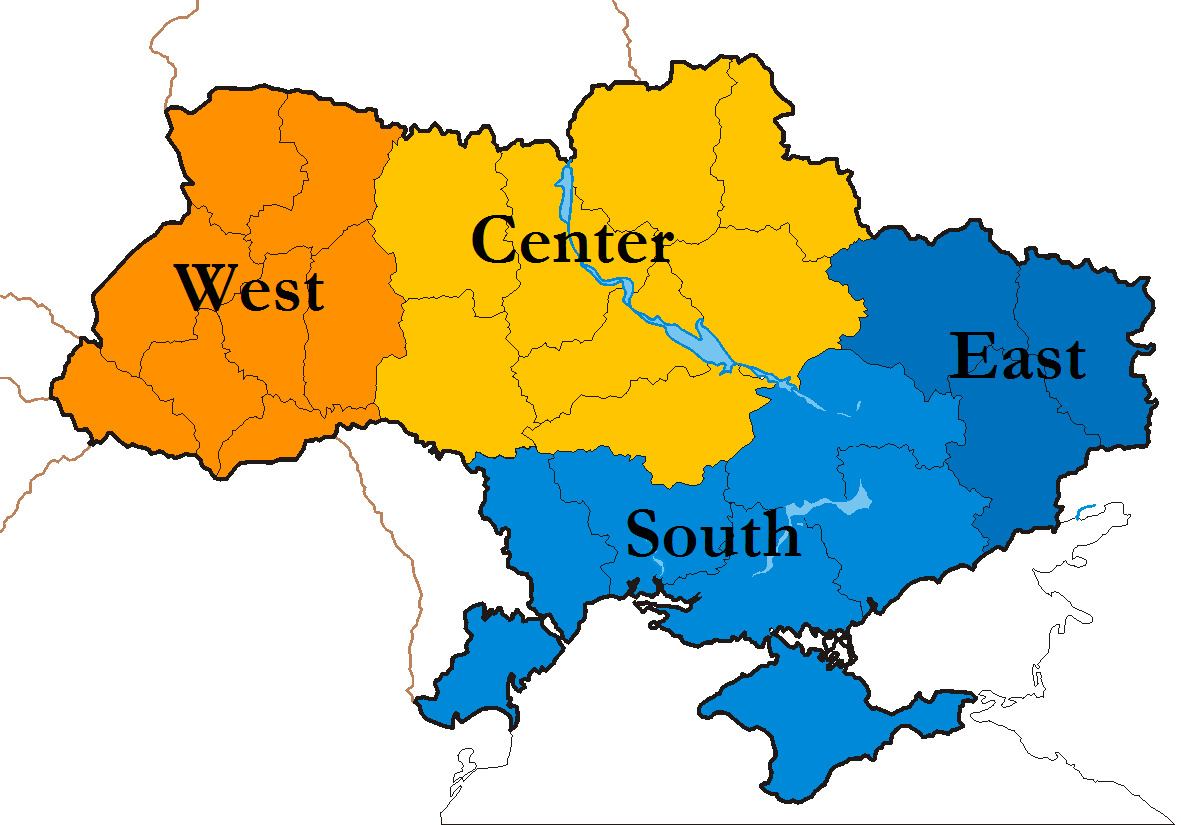
Kyiv International Institute of Sociology (KIIS) geographical division of Ukraine used in their polls.

In a poll conducted by Kyiv International Institute of Sociology in the first half of February 2014 0.7% of polled in West Ukraine believed "Ukraine and Russia must unite into a single state", nationwide this percentage was 12.5. The Russian-occupied parts of the Luhansk and Donetsk regions of Ukraine were not polled.

During elections voters of Western oblasts (provinces) vote mostly for parties (Our Ukraine, Batkivshchyna) and presidential candidates (Viktor Yushchenko, Yulia Tymoshenko) with a pro-Western and state reform platform. Of the regions of Western Ukraine, Galicia tends to be the most pro-Western and pro-nationalist area. Volhynia's politics are similar, though not as nationalist or as pro-Western as Galicia's. Bukovina-Chernivtsi's electoral politics are more mixed and tempered by the region's significant Romanian minority. Finally, Zakarpattia's electoral politics tend to be more competitive, similar to a Central Ukrainian oblast. This is due to the region's distinct historical and cultural identity as well as the significant Hungarian and Romanian minorities. The politics in the region was dominated by such Ukrainian parties as Andriy Baloha's Team, Social Democratic Party of Ukraine (united), Congress of Carpathian Ruthenians led by the Rusyn Orthodox Church bishop Dimitry Sydor and KMKSZ – Hungarian Party in Ukraine.

== Demographics ==
=== Religion ===
Religion in western Ukraine (2016)
1. Eastern Orthodoxy (57.0%)
2. Greek Catholicism (30.9%)
3. Unspecified Christianity (4.30%)
4. Protestantism (3.90%)
5. Roman Catholicism (1.60%)
6. Judaism (0.20%)
7. Non-believers (2.10%)

Percentage of Ukrainians in each oblast (2001 census)

According to a 2016 survey of religion in Ukraine held by the Razumkov Center, approximately 93% of the population of western Ukraine declared to be believers, while 0.9% declared to non-believers, and 0.2% declared to atheists.

Of the total population, 97.7% declared to be Christians (57.0% Eastern Orthodox, 30.9% members of the Ukrainian Greek Catholic Church, 4.3% simply Christians, 3.9% members of various Protestant churches, and 1.6% Latin Church Catholics), by far more than in all other regions of Ukraine, while 0.2% were Jews. Non-believers and other believers not identifying with any of the listed major religious institutions constituted about 2.1% of the population.

=== Ethnicity ===
Prior to World War II the areas of current Lviv Oblast, Ivano-Frankivsk Oblast, Ternopil Oblast, Volyn Oblast and Rivne Oblast were parts of Polish voivodeships of Lwów, Stanisławów, Tarnopol and Wołyń (Volhynia). This area was ethnically very mixed. Table below shows the linguistic (mother tongue) and religious structure of interwar South-East Poland (now part of Western Ukraine) by county, according to the 1931 census:

Linguistic and religious structure of South-East Poland in 1931
County	Pop.	Ukrainian & Ruthenian	%	Polish	%	Yiddish & Hebrew	%	Other language (Note: Includes German and Czech, etc.)	%	Uniate & Orthodox	%	Roman Catholic	%	Jewish	%	Other religion (Note: Includes Protestants, Old Believers, etc.)	%
Dubno	226709	158173	69.8%	33987	15.0%	17430	7.7%	17119	7.6%	173512	76.5%	27638	12.2%	18227	8.0%	7332	3.2%
Horokhiv	122045	84224	69.0%	21100	17.3%	9993	8.2%	6728	5.5%	87333	71.6%	17675	14.5%	10112	8.3%	6925	5.7%
Kostopil	159602	105346	66.0%	34951	21.9%	10481	6.6%	8824	5.5%	103912	65.1%	34450	21.6%	10786	6.8%	10454	6.6%
Kovel	255095	185240	72.6%	36720	14.4%	26476	10.4%	6659	2.6%	187717	73.6%	35191	13.8%	26719	10.5%	5468	2.1%
Kremenets	243032	196000	80.6%	25758	10.6%	18679	7.7%	2595	1.1%	195233	80.3%	25082	10.3%	18751	7.7%	3966	1.6%
Liuboml	85507	65906	77.1%	12150	14.2%	6818	8.0%	633	0.7%	65685	76.8%	10998	12.9%	6861	8.0%	1963	2.3%
Lutsk	290805	172038	59.2%	56446	19.4%	34142	11.7%	28179	9.7%	177377	61.0%	55802	19.2%	34354	11.8%	23272	8.0%
Rivne	252787	160484	63.5%	36990	14.6%	37484	14.8%	17829	7.1%	166970	66.1%	36444	14.4%	37713	14.9%	11660	4.6%
Sarny	181284	129637	71.5%	30426	16.8%	16019	8.8%	5202	2.9%	132691	73.2%	28192	15.6%	16088	8.9%	4313	2.4%
Volodymyr	150374	88174	58.6%	40286	26.8%	17236	11.5%	4678	3.1%	89641	59.6%	38483	25.6%	17331	11.5%	4919	3.3%
Zdolbuniv	118334	81650	69.0%	17826	15.1%	10787	9.1%	8071	6.8%	86948	73.5%	17901	15.1%	10850	9.2%	2635	2.2%
Borshchiv	103277	52612	50.9%	46153	44.7%	4302	4.2%	210	0.2%	65344	63.3%	28432	27.5%	9353	9.1%	148	0.1%
Brody	91248	50490	55.3%	32843	36.0%	7640	8.4%	275	0.3%	58009	63.6%	22521	24.7%	10360	11.4%	358	0.4%
Berezhany	103824	51757	49.9%	48168	46.4%	3716	3.6%	183	0.2%	54611	52.6%	41962	40.4%	7151	6.9%	100	0.1%
Buchach	139062	70336	50.6%	60523	43.5%	8059	5.8%	144	0.1%	77023	55.4%	51311	36.9%	10568	7.6%	160	0.1%
Chortkiv	84008	40866	48.6%	36486	43.4%	6474	7.7%	182	0.2%	42828	51.0%	33080	39.4%	7845	9.3%	255	0.3%
Kamianka-Buzka	82111	35178	42.8%	41693	50.8%	4737	5.8%	503	0.6%	45113	54.9%	29828	36.3%	6700	8.2%	470	0.6%
Kopychyntsi	88614	45196	51.0%	38158	43.1%	5164	5.8%	96	0.1%	50007	56.4%	31202	35.2%	7291	8.2%	114	0.1%
Pidhaitsi	95663	45031	47.1%	46710	48.8%	3464	3.6%	458	0.5%	52634	55.0%	38003	39.7%	4786	5.0%	240	0.3%
Peremyshliany	89908	32777	36.5%	52269	58.1%	4445	4.9%	417	0.5%	44002	48.9%	38475	42.8%	6860	7.6%	571	0.6%
Radekhiv	69313	39970	57.7%	25427	36.7%	3277	4.7%	639	0.9%	42928	61.9%	17945	25.9%	6934	10.0%	1506	2.2%
Skalat	89215	25369	28.4%	60091	67.4%	3654	4.1%	101	0.1%	34798	39.0%	45631	51.1%	8486	9.5%	300	0.3%
Ternopil	142220	42374	29.8%	93874	66.0%	5836	4.1%	136	0.1%	60979	42.9%	63286	44.5%	17684	12.4%	271	0.2%
Terebovlia	84321	30868	36.6%	50178	59.5%	3173	3.8%	102	0.1%	40452	48.0%	38979	46.2%	4845	5.7%	45	0.1%
Zalishchyky	72021	41147	57.1%	27549	38.3%	3261	4.5%	64	0.1%	48069	66.7%	17917	24.9%	5965	8.3%	70	0.1%
Zbarazh	65579	29609	45.2%	32740	49.9%	3142	4.8%	88	0.1%	36468	55.6%	24855	37.9%	3997	6.1%	259	0.4%
Zboriv	81413	39174	48.1%	39624	48.7%	2522	3.1%	93	0.1%	49925	61.3%	26239	32.2%	5056	6.2%	193	0.2%
Zolochiv	118609	55381	46.7%	56628	47.7%	6066	5.1%	534	0.5%	70663	59.6%	36937	31.1%	10236	8.6%	773	0.7%
Dolyna	118373	83880	70.9%	21158	17.9%	9031	7.6%	4304	3.6%	89811	75.9%	15630	13.2%	10471	8.8%	2461	2.1%
Horodenka	92894	59957	64.5%	27751	29.9%	5031	5.4%	155	0.2%	69789	75.1%	15519	16.7%	7480	8.1%	106	0.1%
Kalush	102252	77506	75.8%	18637	18.2%	5109	5.0%	1000	1.0%	80750	79.0%	14418	14.1%	6249	6.1%	835	0.8%
Kolomyia	176000	110533	62.8%	52006	29.5%	11191	6.4%	2270	1.3%	121376	69.0%	31925	18.1%	20887	11.9%	1812	1.0%
Kosiv	93952	79838	85.0%	6718	7.2%	6730	7.2%	666	0.7%	80903	86.1%	4976	5.3%	7826	8.3%	247	0.3%
Nadvirna	140702	112128	79.7%	16907	12.0%	11020	7.8%	647	0.5%	113116	80.4%	15214	10.8%	11663	8.3%	709	0.5%
Rohatyn	127252	84875	66.7%	36152	28.4%	6111	4.8%	114	0.1%	90456	71.1%	27108	21.3%	9466	7.4%	222	0.2%
Stanyslaviv	198359	120214	60.6%	49032	24.7%	26996	13.6%	2117	1.1%	123959	62.5%	42519	21.4%	29525	14.9%	2356	1.2%
Stryi	152631	106183	69.6%	25186	16.5%	15413	10.1%	5849	3.8%	108159	70.9%	23404	15.3%	17115	11.2%	3953	2.6%
Sniatyn	78025	56007	71.8%	17206	22.1%	4341	5.6%	471	0.6%	61797	79.2%	8659	11.1%	7073	9.1%	496	0.6%
Tlumach	116028	66659	57.5%	44958	38.7%	3677	3.2%	734	0.6%	76650	66.1%	31478	27.1%	6702	5.8%	1198	1.0%
Zhydachiv	83817	61098	72.9%	16464	19.6%	4728	5.6%	1527	1.8%	63144	75.3%	15094	18.0%	5289	6.3%	290	0.3%
Bibrka	97124	60444	62.2%	30762	31.7%	5533	5.7%	385	0.4%	66113	68.1%	22820	23.5%	7972	8.2%	219	0.2%
Dobromyl	93970	52463	55.8%	35945	38.3%	4997	5.3%	565	0.6%	59664	63.5%	25941	27.6%	7522	8.0%	843	0.9%
Drohobych	194456	79214	40.7%	91935	47.3%	20484	10.5%	2823	1.5%	110850	57.0%	52172	26.8%	28888	14.9%	2546	1.3%
Horodok	85007	47812	56.2%	33228	39.1%	2975	3.5%	992	1.2%	56713	66.7%	22408	26.4%	4982	5.9%	904	1.1%
Yavoriv	86762	55868	64.4%	26938	31.0%	3044	3.5%	912	1.1%	62828	72.4%	18394	21.2%	5161	5.9%	379	0.4%
Lviv City	312231	35137	11.3%	198212	63.5%	75316	24.1%	3566	1.1%	50824	16.3%	157490	50.4%	99595	31.9%	4322	1.4%
Lviv County	142800	58395	40.9%	80712	56.5%	1569	1.1%	2124	1.5%	67592	47.3%	67430	47.2%	5087	3.6%	2691	1.9%
Mostyska	89460	37196	41.6%	49989	55.9%	2164	2.4%	111	0.1%	49230	55.0%	34619	38.7%	5428	6.1%	183	0.2%
Rava-Ruska	122072	82133	67.3%	27376	22.4%	10991	9.0%	1572	1.3%	84808	69.5%	22489	18.4%	13381	11.0%	1394	1.1%
Rudky	79170	36254	45.8%	38417	48.5%	4247	5.4%	252	0.3%	45756	57.8%	27674	35.0%	5396	6.8%	344	0.4%
Sambir	133814	68222	51.0%	56818	42.5%	7794	5.8%	980	0.7%	78527	58.7%	43583	32.6%	11258	8.4%	446	0.3%
Sokal	109111	59984	55.0%	42851	39.3%	5917	5.4%	359	0.3%	69963	64.1%	25425	23.3%	13372	12.3%	351	0.3%
Turka	114457	80483	70.3%	26083	22.8%	7552	6.6%	339	0.3%	97339	85.0%	6301	5.5%	10627	9.3%	190	0.2%
Zhovkva	95507	56060	58.7%	35816	37.5%	3344	3.5%	287	0.3%	66823	70.0%	20279	21.2%	7848	8.2%	557	0.6%
South-East Poland	6922206	3983550	57.6%	2243011	32.4%	549782	7.9%	145863	2.1%	4387812	63.4%	1707428	24.7%	708172	10.2%	118794	1.7%

== See also ==
- Dnieper Ukraine
- Western Belarus
- Wild Fields
