= Stefan Wolski =

Polish poet (1914–1992)

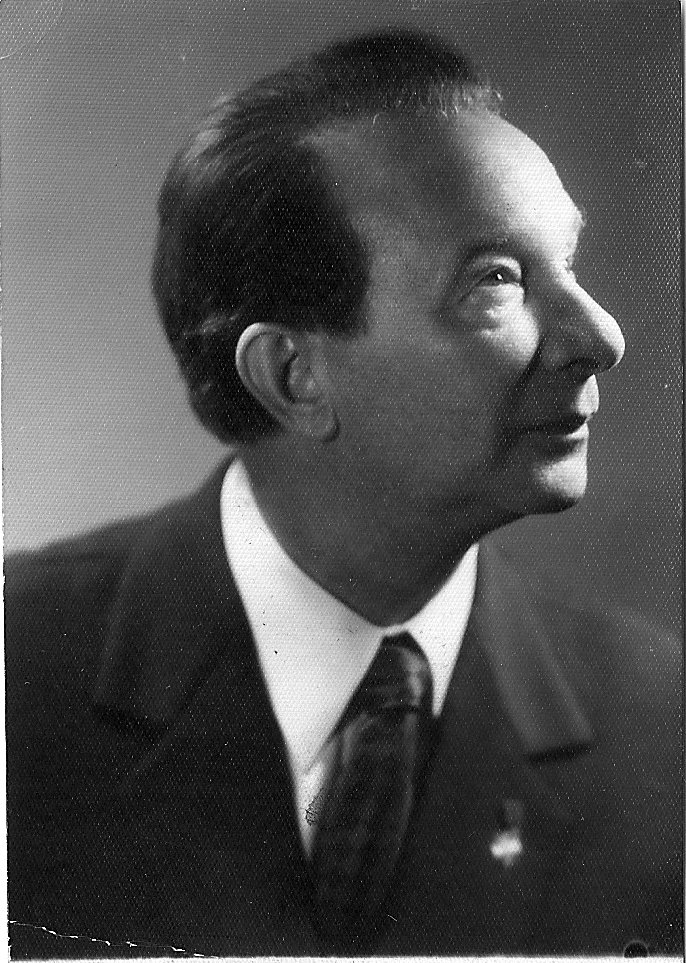
- Born: 24 October 1914; Uman, Kiev Governorate
- Died: 23 March 1992 (aged 77); Lublin, Poland
- Occupations: Writer, poet and lawyer
- Writing career
- Notable works: Ballada Chłopska; Ballada Rycerska

Stefan Wolski (born October 24, 1914, in Uman in the Kiev Governorate; died March 23, 1992, in Lublin, Poland) was a prose writer and poet, lawyer, and participant in Lublin's literary life.

== Life ==
He was born to a Polish intellectual family of noble origin as the son of Walery Ludwik Wolski of the Ślepowron coat of arms and Benigna Katarzyna Sobańska of the Korczak coat of arms. During the October Revolution, after the disappearance of her father, the mother repatriated him and her older son Antoni to Poland; finally, in 1922, he settled in Lublin.

In 1928, he enrolled in the Stanisław Staszic State Gymnasium in Lublin He passed his high school diploma in 1935, after which he completed his military service, completing the reserve cadet course in Lutsk. In the 1936/1937 academic year, he began studies at the Faculty of Law and Social and Economic Sciences of the Catholic University of Lublin, working at the same time in the City Board (he was, among others, secretary of the city president). In 1939, he married Regina Kocyk.

He passed the World War II and the Nazi occupation in the ranks of the Home Army as a second lieutenant, then a lieutenant. He operated under the pseudonym "Tomasz". He was the head of distribution in the District BIP cell.

After the war, he continued his law studies at the Catholic University of Lublin, on August 30, 1946, he obtained a master's degree in law, after completing his court training, he was entered on the list of attorneys. As a lawyer, he defended people tried during the Stalinist era for activities against the system. He was considered to be a specialist in this type of defense.

Stefan Wolski was a founding member of the Lublin Branch of the Polish Writers' Union, in whose structures he acted as min. functions of a secretary, treasurer, vice-president. Since then, he has continuously participated in the organized forms of literary and artistic life in Lublin. He organized for the society of Lublin and the Lublin region the so-called "Literary action", meetings with authors with the participation of members of the branch and colleagues from other departments of the Union. Personally, he often and willingly met the society in Lublin and the field, also with school youth, trying to enrich their knowledge about Polish and foreign literature and culture as much as possible. He organized "Kamena Nights" in Lublin in the 1950s and 1960s. He collaborated with the editorial offices of: "Czas", "Świt" before the war, "Stolica", "Nowiny literackie" and "Kamena" after the war, also as a member of the editorial office.

He was buried at the Catholic cemetery at Lipowa Street in Lublin, Poland.

== Writings ==
=== Prose ===
- Zew serc (1930) - ISBN 978-83-60660-84-3
- Zdarzyło się w FSC (1966) - ISBN 978-83-60660-83-6
- Ballada chłopska (1968) – biographical story about Fr. Piotr Ściegienny, leader of peasants in the Kingdom of Poland, organizer of the uprising of 1844 in Lublin and Kielce, ISBN 978-83-60660-85-0
- Przygody w dolinie zbójów (1971)- something more than a fairy tale with a moral, ISBN 978-83-60660-94-2
- Ballada rycerska (1977) – a historical novel about the Krakow Uprising in 1846 and Edward Dembowski, ISBN 978-83-60660-93-5
- Światła Erebu(1980) - ISBN 978-83-60660-97-3
- Skrzyżowania (1988) - ISBN 978-83-64033-04-9

=== Poetry ===
- Droga do Odry (1949)
- Sztafeta (1950)
- Fantazje olimpijskie (1952)
- Wiersze z Lublina (1953)
- Kronika Lublina (1954)
- Lublin inkaustem złoty (1954)
- Pióro czasu (1958)
- Szedłem tędy (1959)
- Ona (1963)
- Kształty i inwokacje (1965)
- Miłosne rejsy (1973)
- Historia czarnego goździka (1977)
- Wymiary błękitu (1977)
- Pamięć zwierciadeł (1979)
- Poezje - ISBN 978-83-64033-49-0

=== Stories ===
- Ostrokół (1960) - Nowy, Broszka, Kosma, Groch, Barbara i Ewa, Ostrokół, U dozorcy, Na ławce, ISBN 978-83-64033-44-5
- Opowiadania - Adwokat, Chodźmy już stryjku Jakubie, Noc Augusta Wiewióry, Skarb Eligiusza Kiszki, Wierna, Piotr i Dominik, Suma niezwykła, W niedzielę, Szachownica, Ściegieńczycy, Towarzysze, Spotkanie, Nelly and Johnny, ISBN 978-83-64033-40-7
- Ze wspomnień - Preparat, Intelligent, Odwiedziny, Niespodzianka, Człowiek, Ze wspomnień, Daleka droga, Księżycowy kapral, ISBN 978-83-64033-36-0

=== Dramas ===
- Choćby za sto lat (1954) - art against the background of the rebellion of the Peasants' Union, Fr. Piotr Ściegienny
- Upadek Złotego (1955)- a comedy from the early period of the Workers' Holiday Fund
- Niedobra droga (1956)- art from the period of emergence after World War II
- Złoty pierścionek (1961) - art against the backdrop of the Warsaw Uprising
- Dramaty - ISBN 978-83-64033-68-1

==== Play ====
- Fredro w Lublinie - broadcast around 1950 by the broadcasting station of Polish Radio in Lublin.

==== Others ====
- W antologii poezji morskiej (1949)
- W antologii „Mickiewicz w poezji polskiej i obcej” - Ossolineum (1961)
- W opowiadaniach turystycznych - Lawiny schodzą w południe; Odwiedziny (1972)
- Rok 1948 w wydawnictwie jubileuszowym - opowiadanie Adwokat
- Poeci Świata Wietnamowi antologia (1968)
- Wskrzeszanie pamięci Antologia poetów lubelskich (1998) - wiersze: Wspomnienie z Kazimierza i Sen

== Honors ==
=== Polish ===
- Krzyż Kawalerski Orderu Odrodzenia Polski (1984)
- Srebrny Krzyż Zasługi (1974)
- Medal „Za zasługi dla obronności kraju” (1976)
- Srebrna odznaka „Zasłużonemu dla Lublina” (1978)
- Złota odznaka „Zasłużonemu dla Lublina” (1987)
- Odznaka „Zasłużony Działacz Kultury” (1971)
- Odznaka „Za zasługi dla Lubelszczyzny” (1984)

=== Foreign ===
- Croix du Merite
- Sphinx Cross
- La Croix de Partisan
- La Croix de Passeur
- Medaille de Reconnaissance
- Medaille d'Europe
- The Commemorative War Medal of General Eisenhower
- The Interallied Distinguished Service Cross

He received an award for lifetime literary activity of WRN in Lublin in 1969, an award at the "Tourist" literary competition in 1957 for the short story "Daleka Droga", and the WRZZ award at a literary competition for the short story "Wyznania mojego bohatera" in 1977.

== Gallery ==
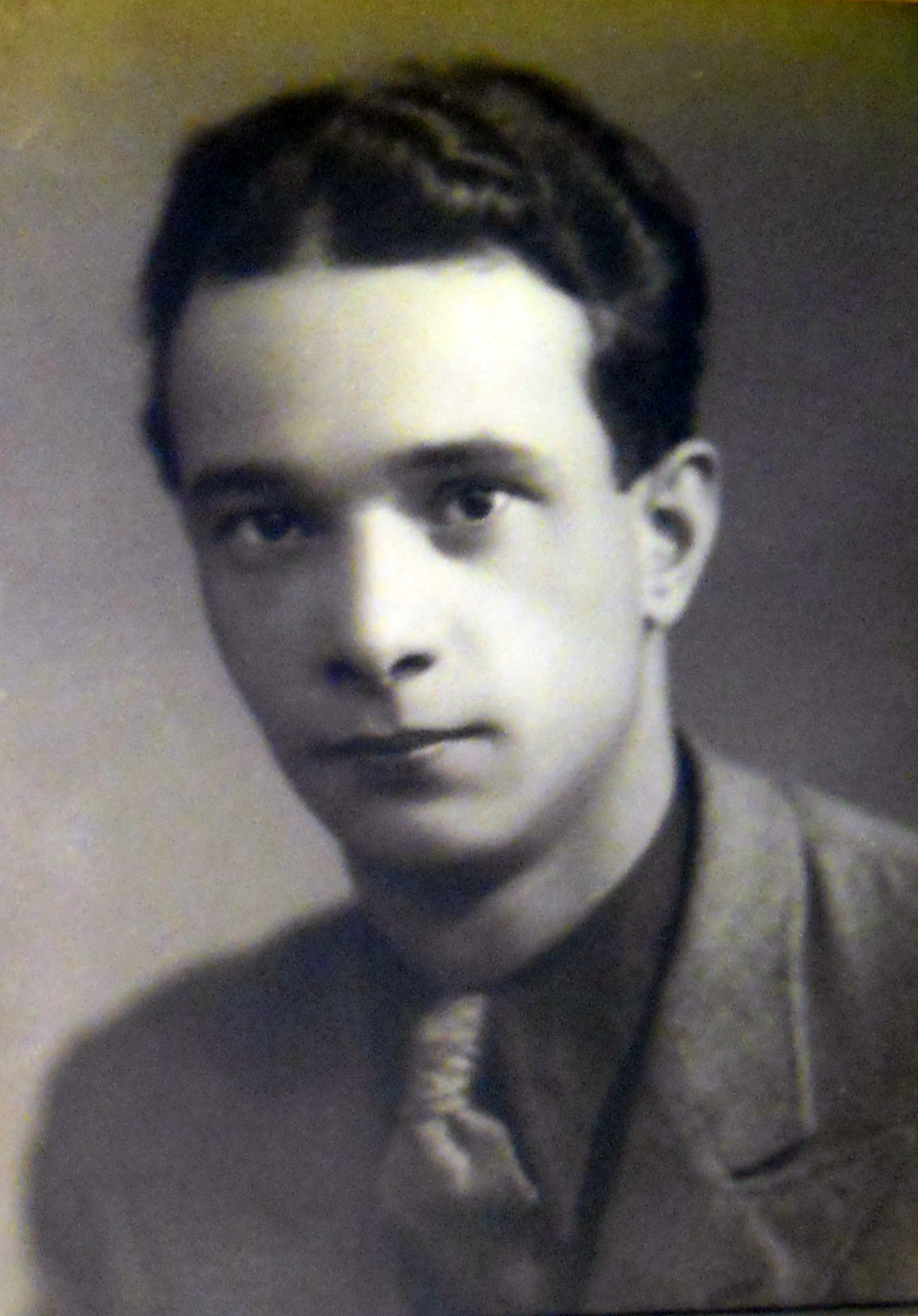
Portrait of young Stefan Wolski

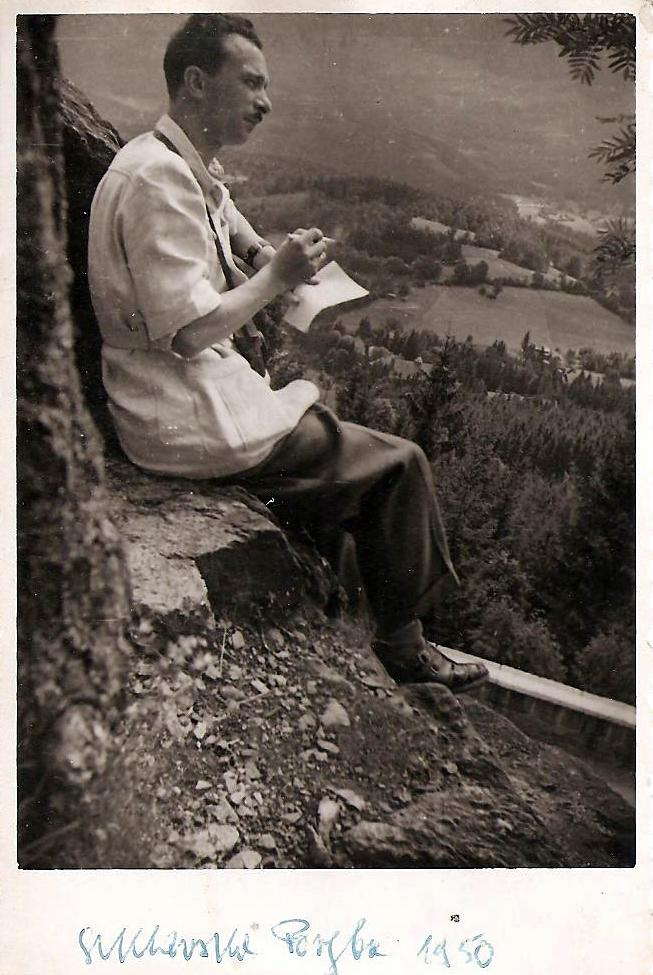
Stefan Wolski is writing - Szklarska Poręba 1950

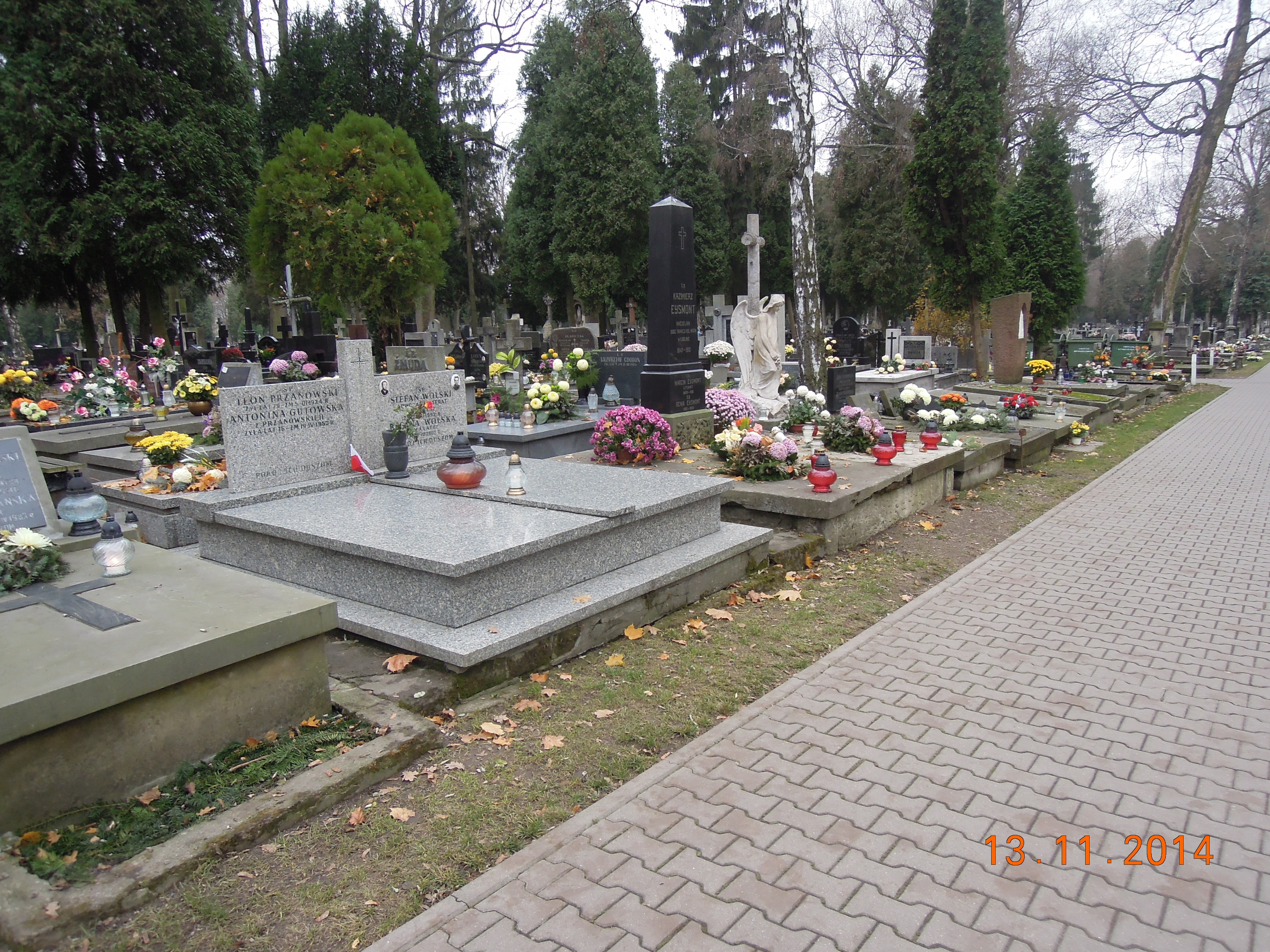
Stefan Wolski's grave
