= Famines in Austrian Galicia =

Series of blights and famines

Famines in Austrian Galicia were a common occurrence, particularly in the mid to late 19th century, as Galicia became heavily overpopulated. Triggered primarily by natural disasters such as floods and blights, famines, compounded by human overpopulation, led to starvation, widespread malnutrition, epidemics, poverty, an average of 50,000 deaths a year, and from the 1870s to the beginning of World War I, emigration.

The first known famines in Galicia took place from 1804 to 1806, and from 1811 to 1813. There was a relatively short period of famine in 1832. A new famine started in 1844 as part of the then-ongoing European potato failure and lasted until 1848. Brief recurrences of famine took place in both 1849 and 1850, due to the lack of potatoes. New incidents of famine took place in 1854–1855, 1865–1866, 1871–1872, 1876, 1880, and 1889. The last known famine in Galicia took place in 1913, but it was part of a wider famine affecting Eastern Europe at the time.

As a side-effect of the famines, the Galician peasants were too malnourished to work properly, and had little immunity to diseases such as cholera, typhus, smallpox and syphilis. Stauter-Halsted describes a vicious cycle in which Galician peasants worked "lethargically because [they were] inadequately nourished and [not living] better because [they] work too little." Galicia was reputedly "the poorest province in Europe", with a weaker economy than Ireland during the same period. Responding to both the poverty and the lack of reforms, many Galician peasants emigrated to other parts of Austria, to Europe, and to the United States.

== Chronological occurrences ==
19th century saw the first famines in Galicia in the years 1804–1806 and 1811–1813. Another famine took place in 1832.

1844 saw the destruction of much of the grain and potato crop due to severe rains and resulting flooding. Skowronek notes that the resulting famine affected the next four years, up to 1848. 1845 saw potato blight according to Grodziski, although Kieniewicz writes that that year saw more flooding, with the blight in 1846. The famine of 1847 was partially caused by the unrest of the previous year (see Kraków uprising, Galician slaughter).

Significant famines would affect towns as well, as did the famine of 1847. The 1847 famine is estimated to have affected about 90% of the Galician population, and resulted in at least 227,000 deaths.^{[a]} 1848 saw continued famine, with about 140,000 deaths. There have been reports of cannibalism that year, though they have also been reported in other years of most severe famines.

Although Skowronek notes that a famine ended in 1848, according to Frank another one occurred in 1849, through with only 40,000 deaths. 1850 saw another famine due to another potato blight.

Frank notes famines that occurred in 1855, 1865, 1876 and 1889. Wolff lists a famine in 1880. Dunin-Wąsowicz lists periods of starvation for 1853–1854, 1865–1866, and 1871–1872.

A large famine affected many Eastern European territories, including Galicia, as late as 1913.

== Causes, contributing factors and results ==
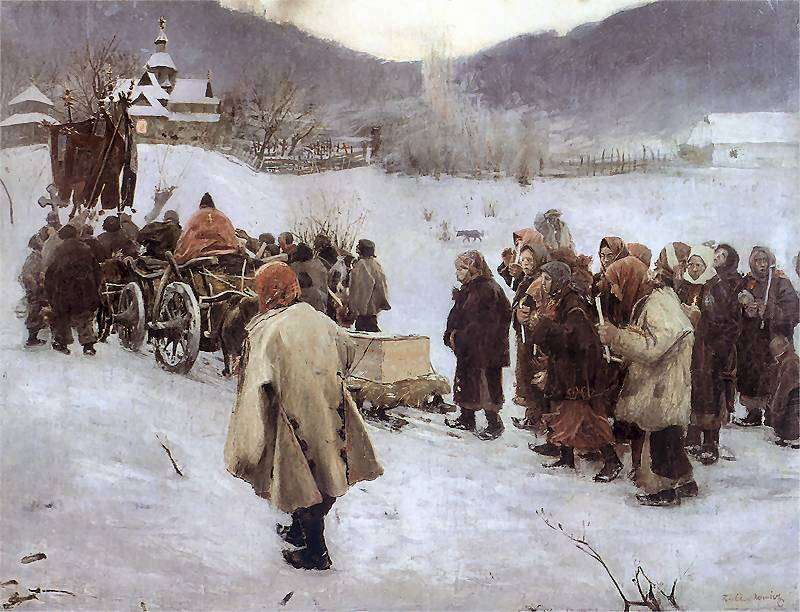
Funeral in Galicia by Teodor Axentowicz, 1882

The direct reasons for famines are often given as bad weather and blights (in particular potato blight); however there are also major social factors which caused famines in Galicia to be more likely, and to have more serious consequences than in many other parts of Europe.

In the 19th century, most of Galicia was part of the Austrian Empire (later Austria-Hungary), which acquired it through the partitions of Poland, and was its poorest province. Neither the mostly Polish large landowners, nor the Austrian imperial government, showed much interest in reform, such as industrialization, which would upset the system in which Galicia was a provider of agricultural products for the rest of the Empire, and a market for inferior industrial goods, a situation profitable for both the governments and the landowners. The Austrian government treated Galicia as a colony that could be treated to another country, and overtaxed it rather than invested in it.

The agricultural productivity of Galician peasants was one of the lowest in Europe, due to the use of primitive agricultural techniques, many little different from those used in the Middle Ages. The situation was compounded by the lack of good land and growing population, resulting in the steadily diminishing size of an individual peasant's plot. Over 70% of Galicia population lived off the land. In the second half of the 19th century, with only a marginal increase of arable land (about 7%), the population of peasants doubled. In 1899, 80% of the plots had less than 5 acres, and many were not able to grow enough food on their plots to support their families. Overpopulation in Galicia has been so severe that it has been described as the most overpopulated place in Europe, and compared to India and China.

As a result, Galician peasants have been too malnourished to work properly, and had little immunity to diseases such as cholera, typhus, smallpox and syphilis. Stauter-Halsted describes a vicious cycle in which Galician peasants worked "lethargically because [they were] inadequately nourished and [not living] better because [they] work too little." Frank quotes Szepanowski: "every resident of Galicia does one-quarter of a man's work and eats one-half of a man's food." Norman Davies concurs, noting that the situation in Galicia was likely more desperate than in Ireland, and that Galicia was likely "the poorest province in Europe". The near constant famines in Galicia, resulting in 50,000 deaths a year, have been described as endemic. Responding to the poverty and lack of reform, many peasants chose to emigrate, to other parts of Austria, Europe, and the United States.

== See also ==
- Poverty in Austrian Galicia
- Galician slaughter

== Notes ==
a Although as shown by the analysis of late 1840s deaths in Zadoks, many death estimates sum those from hunger and disease. For example, Bodnar attributes the deaths to "typhus following the potato famine".
