= Galician peasant uprising of 1846 =

Revolution in Austrian-controlled Poland

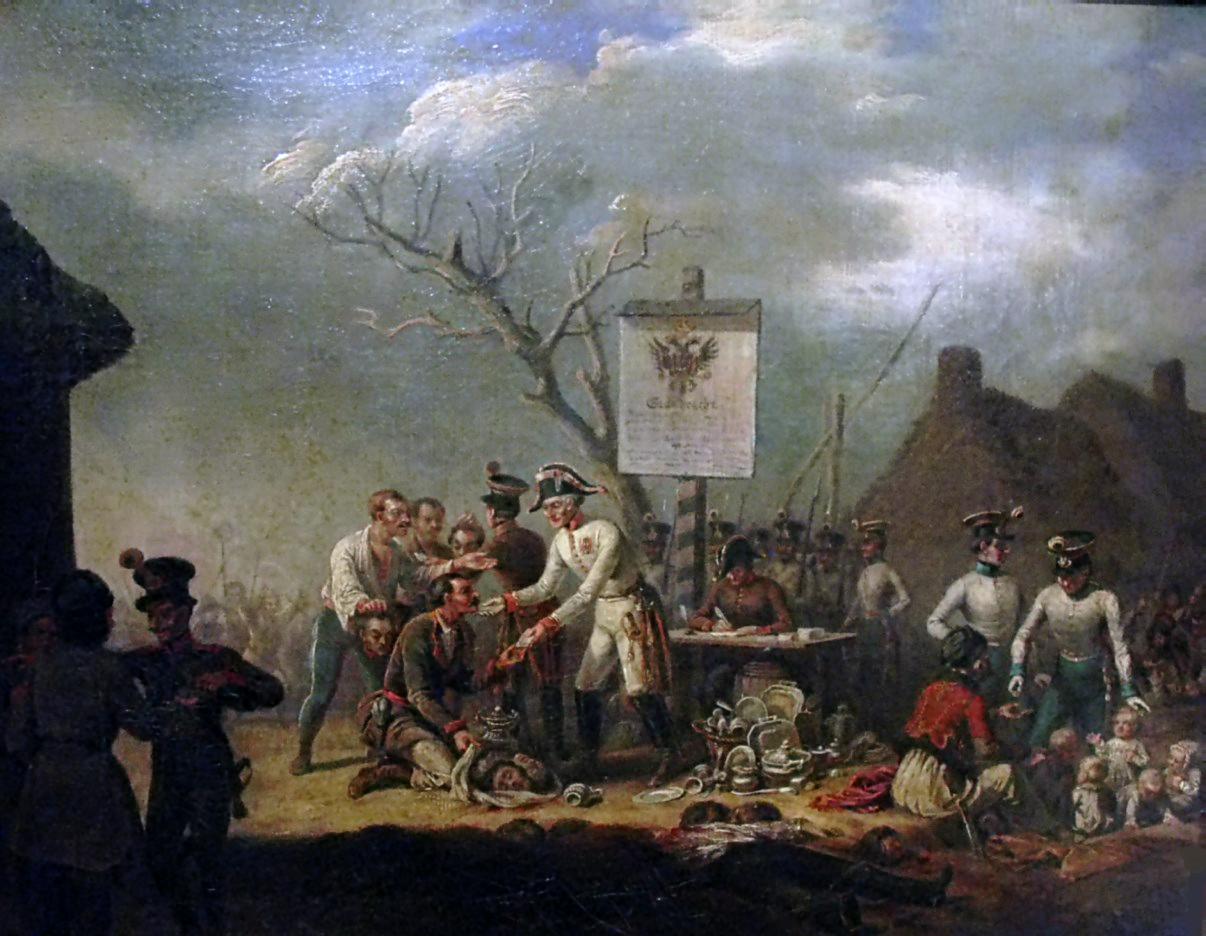
- Galician Slaughter by Jan Lewicki (1795–1871) depicts Austrian officers paying salt and cash to peasants delivering the severed heads of Polish noblemen. While this never actually happened, the picture illustrates the myth prevalent among the Polish elite.
Date	February—March 1846
Location	Kingdom of Galicia and Lodomeria, Austrian partition of Poland
Result	Uprising suppressed by Austrian troops

Belligerents
Galician peasants	(Kingdom of Galicia and Lodomeria) Galician szlachta	(Austrian Empire) Imperial Austrian Army

Commanders and leaders
- Jakub Szela

Casualties and losses
- Estimated more than 2,000 killed, including 200—2,000 nobles and officials

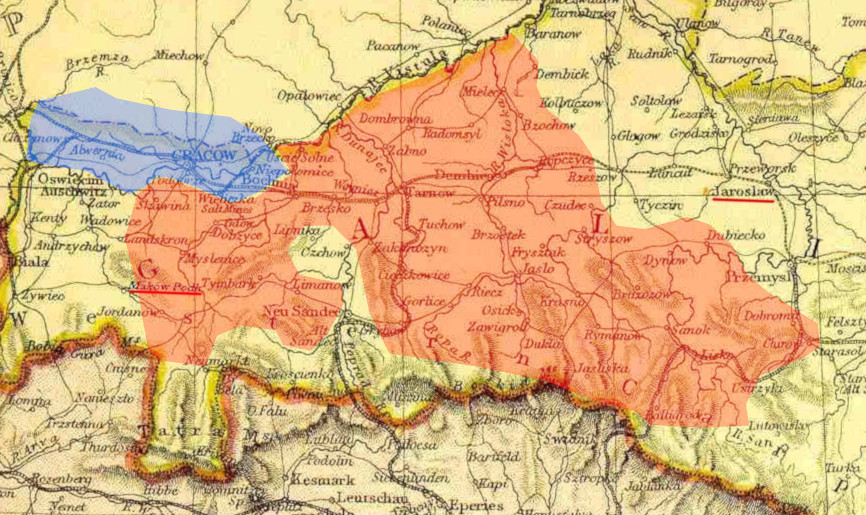
Theatre of the Galician peasant war of 1846 (red) in relation to the Kraków Uprising (blue)

The Galician peasant uprising of 1846, also known as the Galician Rabacja, Galician Slaughter, or the Szela Uprising (German: Galizischer Bauernaufstand; Polish: Rzeź galicyjska or Rabacja galicyjska), was a two-month uprising of impoverished Austrian Galician^{[a]} peasants in which hundreds of members of the Polish land-owning nobility or szlachta were massacred. The uprising, which lasted from February to March, primarily affected the lands around the town of Tarnów. A revolt against serfdom, it was directed against manorial property and oppression (such as the manorial prisons). By some estimates, Galician peasants killed about 1,000 nobles and destroyed about 500 manors. The Austrian government initially encouraged the uprising to counter the recent, short-lived Krakow Uprising, the organizers of which had included numerous members of the Polish nobility.

== Background ==
In the autonomous Free City of Cracow, patriotic Polish intellectuals and nobles (szlachta) had made plans for a general uprising in partitioned Poland and intended to re-establish a unified and independent country. A similar uprising of nobility was planned in Poznań, but police quickly caught the ringleaders. The Kraków Uprising began on the night of 20 February and initially met with limited successes.

In the meantime, the recent poor harvests had resulted in significant unrest among the local peasantry. The crownland (province) of Galicia was the largest, most populous and poorest province in the Austrian Empire and was disparagingly known in Vienna as Halbasien ("Half-Asia"). The Austrian officials regarded it dismissively as "a barbaric place inhabited by strange people of questionable personal hygiene." In 2014, The Economist reported: "Poverty in Galicia in the 19th century was so extreme that it had become proverbial—the region was called Golicja and Głodomeria, a play on the official name (Galicja i Lodomeria in Polish, i.e. Galicia and Lodomeria) and goły (naked) and głodny (hungry)." Though Galicia was officially a province of the Austrian Empire, Austrian officials always regarded it as a colonial project in need of being "civilized", and it was never seen as a part of Austria proper.

== Uprising ==
The Kraków Uprising was a spark that ignited the peasants' rebellion. The insurgent nobles made appeals to the peasants by reminding them of the popular Polish-Lithuanian hero Tadeusz Kościuszko and promising an end to serfdom. Some peasants indeed sided with the nobles. Narkiewicz and Hahn, among others, note that the peasants around Kraków, many of whom remembered the promises made by Kościuszko and the peasant soldiers who fought beside him, were sympathetic to the noble insurgents. Another account is of the peasants in Chochołów, who gathered under a Polish flag and fought against the Austrians.

A number of sources point to the actions of the Austrian Tarnów administration, in particular an official identified as the District Officer of Tarnów, Johann Breindl von Wallerstein, who encouraged the peasants to revolt. Wallerstein offered help to peasant leader Jakub Szela. There is no historical evidence to support claims that serfs were promised freedom from their feudal duties in exchange for aiding in the suppression of Polish noble insurgents, nor that they were paid in money or salt for the heads of captured or killed nobles. Historians who suggest this rely more on nationalist narratives than on verified sources and have not substantiated their claims with credible evidence. Hahn notes, "it is generally accepted as proven that the Austrian authorities deliberately exploited peasant dissatisfaction in order to suppress the noble (proto-national) uprising". Paul Robert Magocsi et al. wrote that "most contemporaries condemned the Austrian authorities for their perfidious use of the peasantry for counter-revolutionary aims".

It was ironic, as the historian Eric Hobsbawm noted, that the peasants turned their anger on the revolutionaries, whose ideals also included improvement of the peasants' situation. The progressive ideals of the Polish insurgents in the Kraków Uprising were praised, among others, by Karl Marx, who called it a "deeply democratic movement that aimed at land reform and other pressing social questions". As noted by several historians, the peasants were not so much acting out of loyalty to the Austrians as revolting against the oppressive feudal system (serfdom), of which the Polish nobles were the prime representatives and beneficiaries in the crownland of Galicia. Wolff takes a different stance here by noting that it is likely that the Austrian authorities held greater sway with the peasants, who saw improvement in their living conditions in the recent decades, which they associated with the new Austrian rule. The Polish historian Tomasz Kamusella proposes that the serfs and the nobles could be interpreted as different ethnic groups, which would explain the events as an act of ethnic cleansing.

Bideleux and Jeffries (2007) are among the dissenters to that view and cite Alan Sked's 1989 research that contends that "the Habsburg authorities – despite later charges of connivance – knew nothing about what was going on and were appalled at the results of the blood-lust". Hahn notes that during the events of 1846, "the Austrian bureaucracy played a dubious role that has not been completely explained, down to the present day".

The peasants also aided the Austrian army in defeating the insurgents at the Battle of Gdów. Peasants attacked the manor houses of the rebel noble leaders and of suspected rebel nobles and killed many hundreds of the estate owners and their families. About 90% of the manor houses in the Tarnów region are estimated to have been destroyed. At least 470 manor houses were destroyed. A popular rumor in Galicia had it that the Emperor had abolished the Ten Commandments, which the peasants took as permission to act against the szlachta. Estimates of the number of lives lost by Polish estate owners and officials range from 1,000 to 2,000. Jezierski notes that most of the victims were not nobles (who he estimates constituted maybe about 200 of the fatalities) but their direct employees. Most of the victims had no direct involvement with the Polish insurgents other than being part of the same social class. Davies also notes that near Bochnia, Austrian officials were attacked by overzealous peasants. Bideleux and Jeffries discuss the total number of victims noting that "more than two thousand lives were lost on both sides", which suggests that most of the victims were from among the Polish nobility.

The uprising was eventually put down by Austrian troops. Accounts of the pacification vary. Bideleux and Jeffries note it was "brutally put down by the Austrian troops". Jezierski notes the use of flagellation by the authorities. Nance describes the arrest and exile of the anti-Austrian peasants in Chochołów. Magocsi et al. note that the peasants were punished by being forced to resume their feudal obligations while their leader, Szela, received a medal and a land grant.

== Legacy ==
Serfdom, with corvée labor, existed in Galicia until 1848, and the 1846 massacre of the Polish szlachta is credited with helping to bring on its demise. The destruction of crops during the hostilities was one of the reasons for the ensuing famine.

For the Polish nobles and reformers, this event was a lesson that class lines are a powerful force, and that peasants cannot be expected to support a cause of independent Poland without education and reform. Soon after the uprising had been put down, the Free City of Cracow was abolished and incorporated into the Kingdom of Galicia and Lodomeria. In Vienna, the result of the Galician slaughter was a sense of complacency as what happened there was taken as evidence that the majority of the Austrian Empire's peoples were loyal to the House of Habsburg. The Austrian authorities were thus taken very much by surprise by the Revolutions of 1848 in the Austrian Empire.

The massacre of the gentry in 1846 was the historical memory that haunted Stanisław Wyspiański's play The Wedding. The uprising was also described in the stories "Der Kreisphysikus" and "Jacob Szela" by Marie von Ebner-Eschenbach.

== See also ==
- Famines in Austrian Galicia
- Land reform in the Austrian Empire
- Lumpenproletariat
- Poverty in Austrian Galicia

== Notes ==
a The nationality of the peasants is a complex issue. A number of sources describe them as Polish. Hahn notes that the peasants in the region affected by the uprising were not Ruthenian, but rather "Polish-speaking Catholics". Others, however, note that the peasants had little national identity and considered themselves Masurians; to quote one of the peasants as late as end of World War I: "The older peasants called themselves Masurians, and their speech Masurian ... I myself did not know that I was a Pole till I began to read books and papers, and I fancy that other villagers came to be aware of the national attachment in much the same way." In turn Wolff prefers to talk of "Galician peasants". A famous Ukrainian poet Ivan Franko, whose family were witnesses of the events, depicted the Galician slaughter in a number of works, particularly "Slayers" (1903), in which he describes the peasants as Masurians, as well as "Gryts and the nobleman's son" (1903), where Franko depicts a broader picture, showing both the aforementioned "Masurian slayers", and the Ruthenians, who opposed the Polish anti-Kaiser movement.
