= Stanisław Szczepanowski =

Polish economist, engineer, businessman, and politician

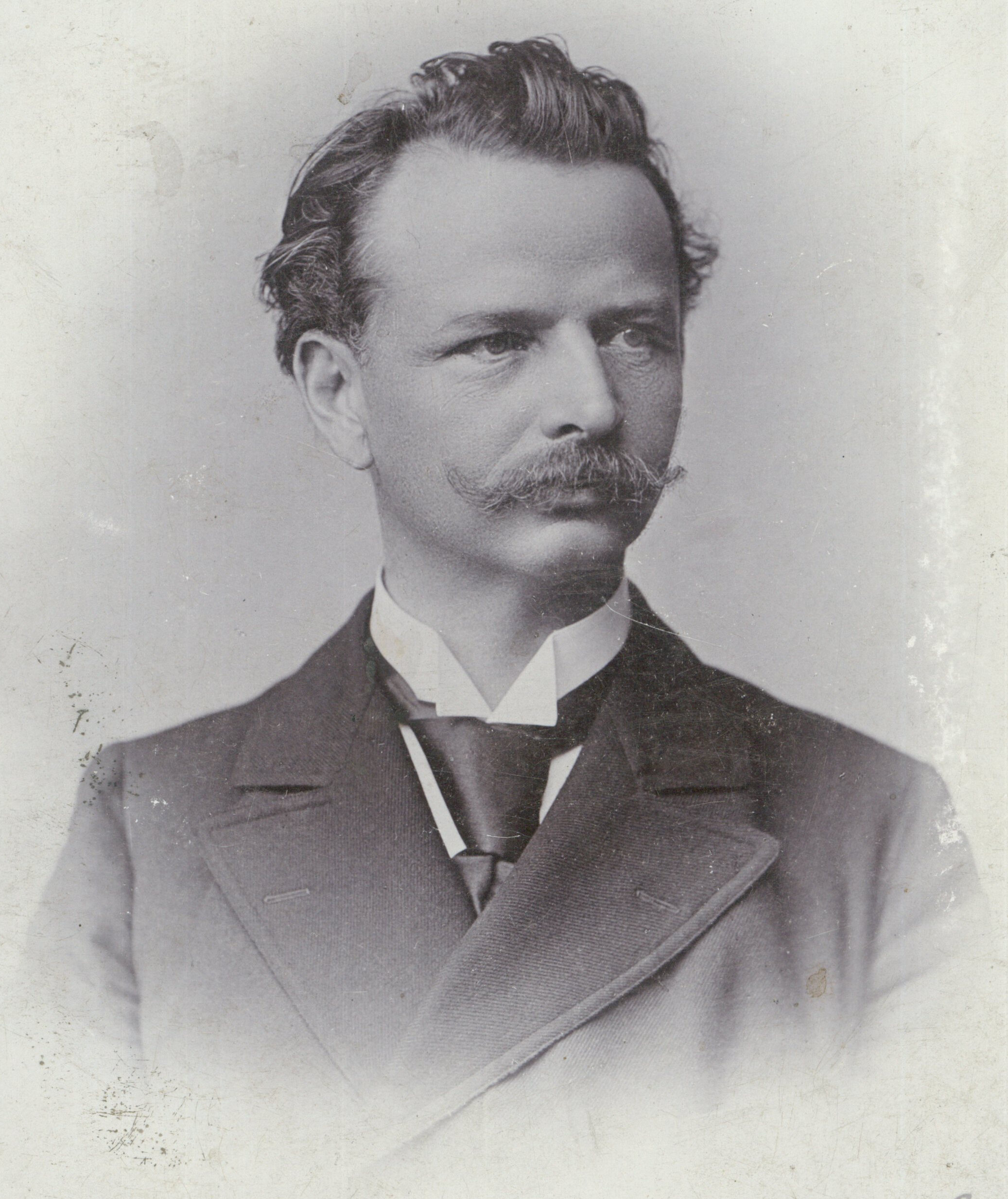
- Born: December 12, 1846; Kosten, Grand Duchy of Posen
- Died: October 31, 1900 (aged 53); Bad Nauheim, Hesse-Nassau
- Occupations: economist, engineer, businessman, and politician
- Relatives: Marian Smoluchowski (nephew)

You may also be looking for 11th century Saint, Stanislaus of Szczepanów

Stanisław Szczepanowski (1846–1900) was a Polish economist, engineer, businessman, and politician. Deputy to parliaments of Austria and Galicia.

Szczepanowski was born in 1846 in the Duchy of Posen (Poznań), in what was then Prussia. As a youth, he worked with his father (an engineer) in Hungary, studied in Vienna, traveled through western Europe, including Strasbourg and Northern Italy, and dreamed of contributing to an industrialized and modern Polish economy. "My dream was to become a Polish Cavour," he remarked, in reference to the prime minister of unified Italy.

For almost a decade starting in March 1869, he lived and worked in London for the British India Office. In 1873, he visited Austrian Galicia but returned to London and accepted British citizenship. After his return to Galicia, he became a leading figure in the Austrian oil industry.
