= Poverty in Austrian Galicia =

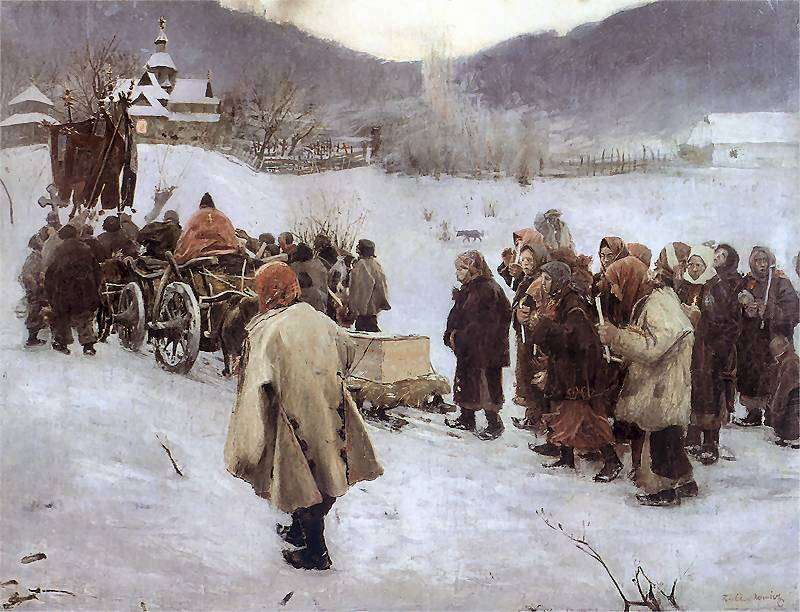
Hutsul Funeral, by Teodor Axentowicz, 1882

Poverty in Austrian Galicia was extreme, particularly in the late 19th century. Reasons included little interest in reforms on the part of major landowners and the Austrian government, population growth resulting in small peasant plots, inadequate education, primitive agricultural techniques, a vicious circle of chronic malnutrition, famines and disease, reducing productivity.

Poverty in the Kingdom of Galicia and Lodomeria was so widespread that the expression "Galician misery" (nędza galicyjska) or "Galician poverty" (bieda galicyjska) became proverbial, and Poles often mockingly distorted the name of the province of Galicia and Lodomeria to "Golicja i Głodomeria", incorporating plays on the Polish words, respectively, for "naked" and "hungry" ("Nakedia and Hungrymeria"). The poverty and regular famines in the region were often compared to those in British Ireland.

== Causes and contributing factors ==
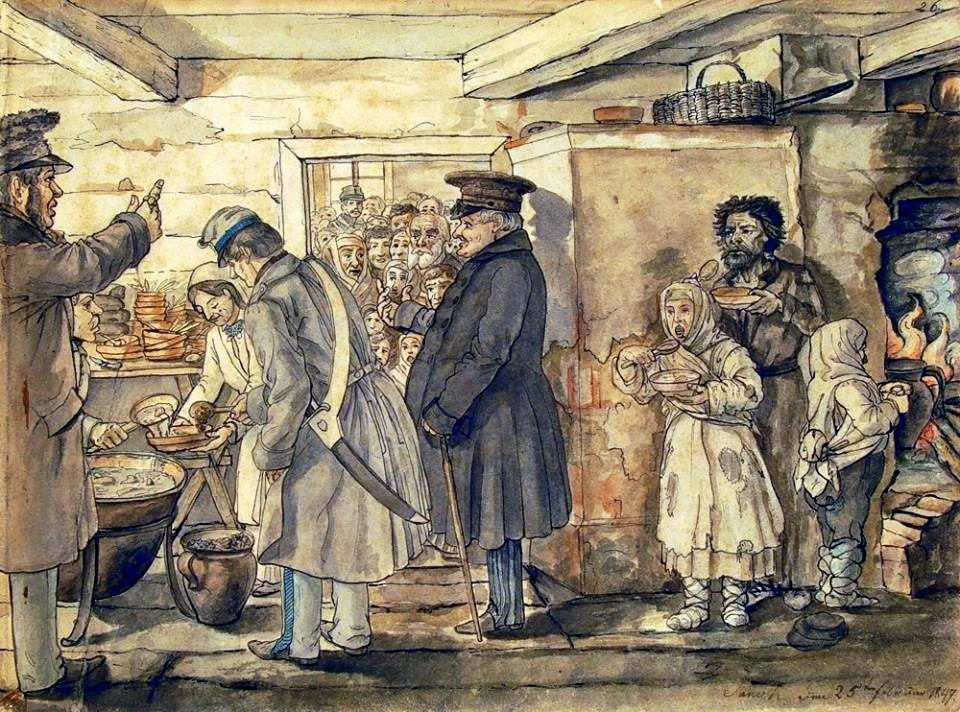
Giving Out Meals in Sanok, by Jan Gniewosz, 1847

Austria-Hungary failed to create transportation networks necessary for the development of industries and markets throughout the empire. Unlike the German Empire, the Habsburgs were hostile toward the idea of building railway systems in the provinces and remained fixated on their own metropolis. The whole of Austrian Bohemia was served by only one line throughout the 1860s. Emperor Francis Joseph I opposed further construction "lest revolution might come into the country." Railways were owned privately in Austria-Hungary before 1881 and only gradually acquired by the state interest until the outbreak of World War I. Viennese banks – wrote Clive Trebilcock of Cambridge – were tapping the eastern grain-plains [of Galicia] in fully colonial style.

The new state borders had cut Galicia off from many of its traditional trade routes and markets of the former Polish Crown, resulting in economic stagnation and the decline of Galician towns. Lviv lost its status as a significant trade centre. After a short period of limited investments, the Austrian government started the fiscal exploitation of Galicia and drained the region of manpower through conscription to the imperial army. The Austrians decided that Galicia should not develop industrially but remain an agricultural area to serve as a supplier of food products and raw materials to other Habsburg provinces. New taxes were instituted, investments were discouraged and cities and towns were neglected.

Education lagged behind, with only 15% or so of the peasants attending any kind of school, meaning that few peasants had the skills to pursue other careers. Even if they did, no major Galician city (Kraków or Lviv) was a center of significant industry, which gave peasants little alternatives to their profession. The Austrian imperial government showed absolutely no interest in schooling and subsequent reform such as industrialization, which would upset the system in which Galicia was a cheap provider of agricultural products for the Empire, and a market for inferior industrial goods, a situation profitable for both the governments and the landowners. The Austrian government treated Galicia as a colony that could be treated as another country, and overtaxed it rather than invested in it. In what little industry Galicia had, one of the largest local branches (about a third of the total) was alcohol brewing, further exploiting and impoverishing the peasantry. Alcoholism was a major social problem.

The agricultural productivity of Galician peasants was one of the lowest in Europe because of primitive agricultural techniques, many little different from those used in the Middle Ages. The situation in Northern (Polish) Galicia was compounded by the lack of good land and a growing population, resulting in the steadily diminishing size of an individual peasant's plot. Over 70% of Galicia's population lived off the land. In the second half of the 19th century, with only a marginal increase of arable land (about 7%), the population of peasants doubled. In 1899, 80% of the plots had fewer than 5 acres (2.0 ha), and many were not able to grow enough food on their plots to support their families. Overpopulation in Galicia has been so severe that it has been described as the most overpopulated place in Europe and compared to India and China.

The emancipation of serfs in 1848 did not improve their situation significantly, as they were given poorly-paid jobs by the local major landowners, who owned 43% of the arable land in 1848, which did little to improve the peasants welfare from the previous feudal relations. Other changes in the law made the peasants also lose access to many forests and pastures, which the large landowners tried to secure for themselves.

According to Alison Fleig Frank, the role of Polish landowners should not be overlooked. Six percent of Ukrainian speakers engaged in nonagricultural occupations vs 33% of Polish speakers. She writes:

It was Polish landlords who retained control over forests and meadows (and hence over sources of fuel and building materials) and blocked any reforms put forward in the imperial Parliament intended to improve the social or economic status of Austria's disenfranchised peasant population. Indeed, if the emperor could grant rights that were worthless as long as the Polish nobility prevented their exercise, what good was the emperor?

== Results ==
As a result of Galician poverty, the peasants were too malnourished to work properly, and had little immunity to diseases such as cholera, typhus, smallpox and syphilis. Stauter-Halsted describes a vicious circle in which Galician peasants worked "lethargically because [they were] inadequately nourished and [not living] better because [they] work too little." Frank quotes Szepanowski: "every resident of Galicia does one-quarter of a man's work and eats one-half of a man's food." The near constant famines in Galicia, resulting in 50,000 deaths a year, have been described as endemic. Many peasants were heavily in debt and had lost their land to the money-lenders, most of whom were Jewish, which led to resentment and growing anti-Semitism.

The misery of Galician peasants was highlighted by a number of activists such as Ivan Franko and in several publications such as Scarcity and Famine in Galicia by Roger Łubieński (1880). Stanisław Szczepanowski in 1888 published the still widely cited Galician Misery in Numbers and his phrase Galician misery or Galician poverty (nędza galicyjska or bieda galicyjska) became a proverbial description of Galicia, characterizing the depressed economy of the region. The dismal state of the province's economy led people to mockingly refer to the region as Golicja i Głodomeria, a pun on the official name of the territory, Królestwo Galicji i Lodomerii, incorporating the Polish words "goły" ("naked") and "głodny" ("hungry") – "Nakedia and Hungrymeria".

The colonisation was imposed by the Austrian Empire and simultaneously by Polish landowners. This ethnic divide did not stimulate the Ruthenian and Polish peasants to join forces against the landowners, but divided them further.

In response to the poverty and the lack of reform, many peasants chose to emigrate. This process began in the 1870s with few thousand, then over 80,000 emigrated in the 1880s, about 340,000 in the 1890s, and an even greater number in the 1900s. Davies notes that from the mid-1890s to 1914 (the start of World War I), at least two million people left Galicia, at least 400,000 in 1913 alone. Harzig gives an estimate of 3 million. The years 1911–1914 might have seen the emigration of 25% of Galician population. Some emigration was local, to richer parts of Galicia and nearby Bukovina; others moved to Bohemia, Moravia, Silesia, or other provinces of Austria, Prussia and Russia (including Russian Poland). An increasing number emigrated to the United States (Herzig notes perhaps as many as 800,000 out of her 3 million estimate).

== Comparisons ==
Norman Davies noted that the situation in Galicia was likely more desperate than in Ireland, and that Galicia was likely "the poorest province in Europe". Galicia was indeed the poorest of the Austrian provinces and markedly poorer than Western Europe. In 1890, the per capita product, in 2010 dollars, for Galicia was $1,947. In contrast, the per capita product in Austria was $3,005 and in Bohemia was $2,513. Galicia was not as poor as eastern Hungary, whose per capita product was $1,824 and Croatia-Slavonia, whose per capita product in 2010 dollars was $1,897. Galicia's per capita product was almost identical to that of Transylvania, which was $1,956 in 2010 dollars. Galicia's annual growth rate from 1870 to 1910 was 1.21 percent, slightly lower than the imperial average of 1.5%. In comparison to other countries, Galicia's 1890 per capita product of $1,947 in 2010 dollars was three times lower than that of the United Kingdom ($6,228) and lower than that of every country in northwestern Europe. However, it was higher than that of Portugal ($1,789), Bulgaria ($1,670), Greece ($1,550), Russia ($1,550), and Serbia ($1,295).

== See also ==
- Famines in Austrian Galicia
- Galician slaughter

== Notes ==
a Although as shown by the analysis of late 1840s deaths in Zadoks, many death estimates sum those from hunger and disease. For example, Bodnar attributes the deaths to "typhus following the potato famine".
