= Edward Dembowski =

Polish philosopher (1822–1846)

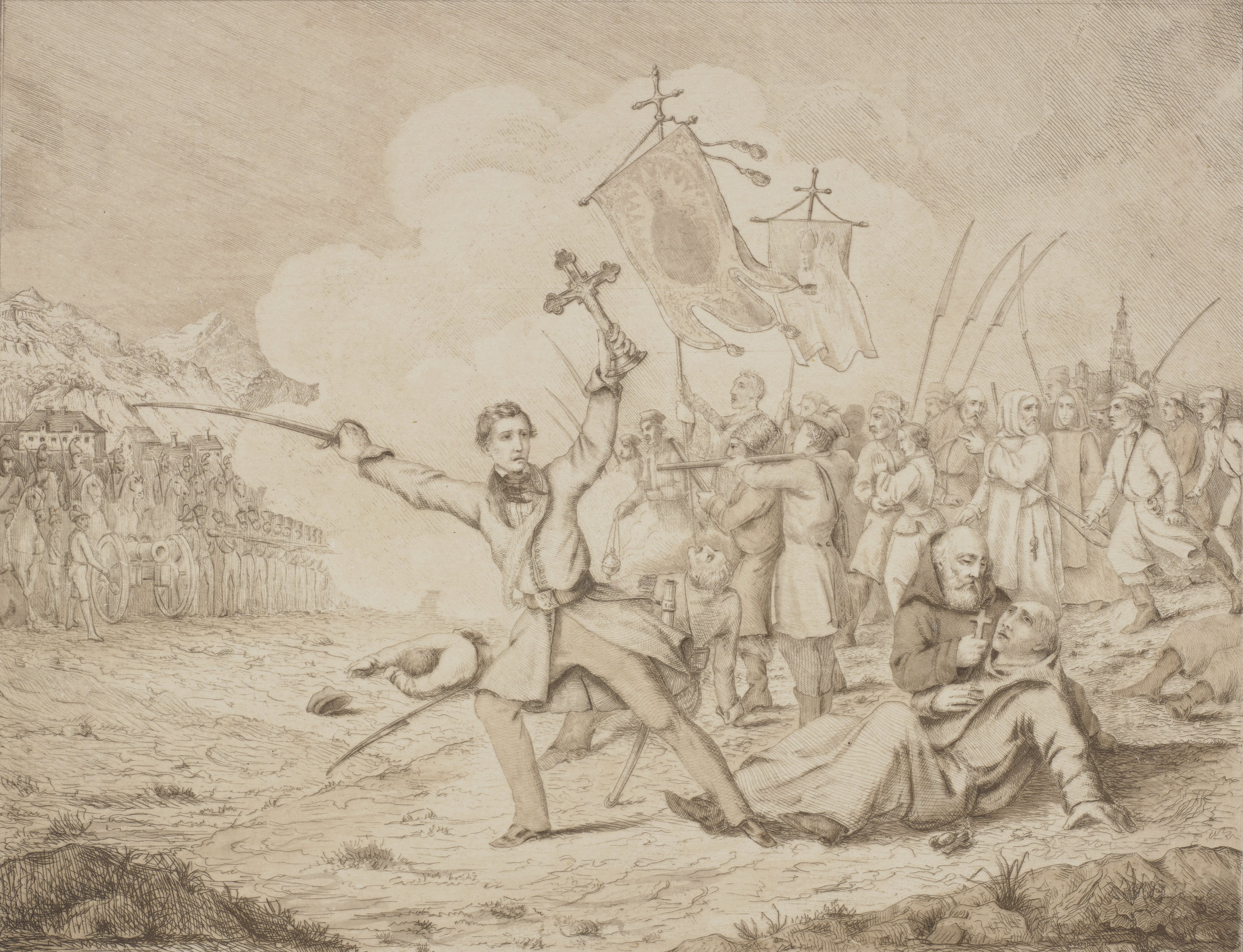
Edward Dembowski at head of 27 February 1846 Kraków Uprising procession

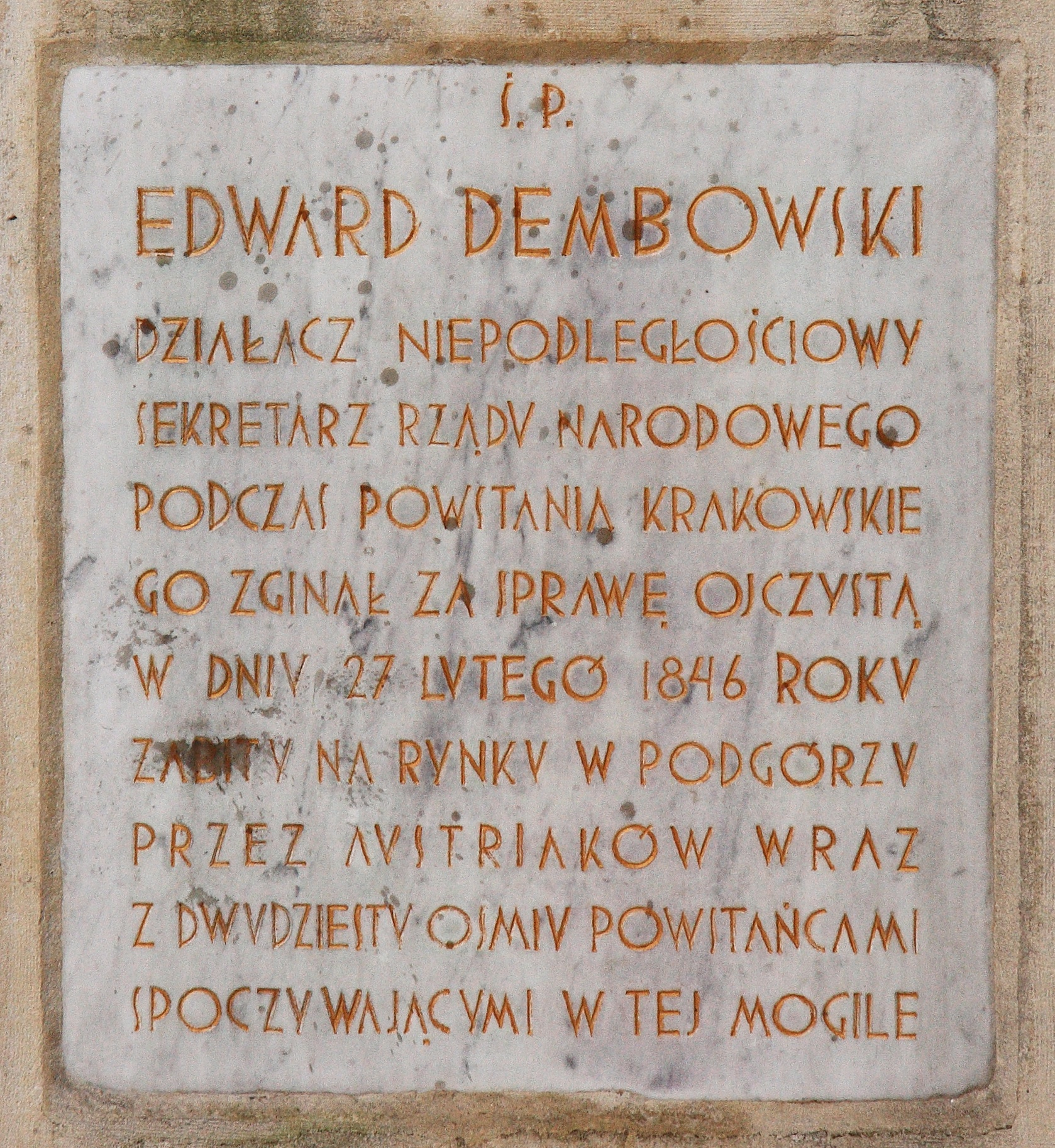
Edward Dembowski's gravestone

Edward Dembowski (31 May 1822 – 27 February 1846) was a Polish philosopher, literary critic, journalist, and leftist independence activist.

== Life ==
Edward Dembowski was the son of Julia, née Kochanowska, and a conservative castellan-voivode of the Congress Poland, Leon Dembowski. On account of Edward's szlachta origins and contrasting radical social views, he was called "the red castellan's-son."

Dembowski published Przegląd Naukowy (The Learned Review), a journal for young, independence-minded members of the intelligentsia.

In 1842–43 Dembowski conducted underground revolutionary activities in the Russian-ruled Congress Poland. Later, being at risk of arrest by Russian authorities, he transferred to Prussian-ruled Greater Poland.

During the 1846 Kraków Uprising, Dembowski was secretary to dictator Jan Tyssowski. Dembowski died on 27 February 1846 at Podgórze, shot by Austrian troops while leading a procession to conduct agitation among the peasants.

In his philosophical views, Dembowski was a leftist Hegelian.

== See also ==
- History of philosophy in Poland
- List of Poles
