= Jan Tyssowski =

Polish revolutionary (1811–1857)

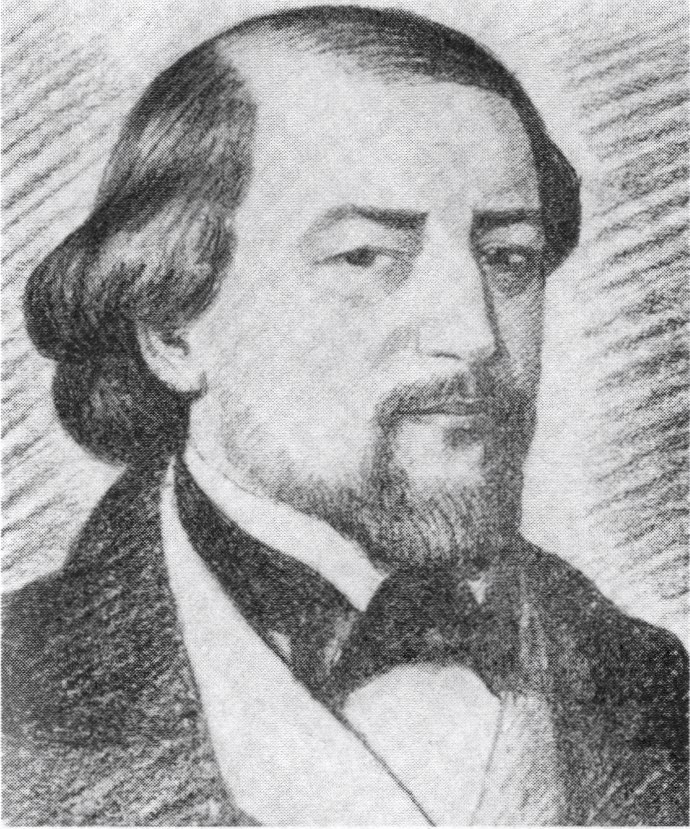
Jan Tyssowski

Jan Józef Tyssowski (also known as John Tyssowski; March 8, 1811 – April 5, 1857), born in Tarnów, Poland, was the self-proclaimed Dictator of the Republic of Kraków during the failed 1846 uprising. He was a Polish intellectual and activist during Poland's rebellions against its occupying powers. He studied philosophy and law at the University of Lwow. After the failed 1831 November Uprising, Russian authorities prohibited his return to Lwow, and he went study at the University of Vienna. He was a Polish political organizer in Galicia with Ludwik Mieroslawski, and was active within the aristocracy and insurrectionist movement. In 1846, Krakow revolted against the Austrians and they withdrew, leaving the Polish-controlled Republic of Krakow in Tyssowski's hands. The government had originally been established as a triumvirate between Tyssowski and two others, but personal differences led Tyssowski to take control. Intending a "classless society", he declared universal suffrage, emancipation of the peasantry, and the discontinuation of rents for peasants. The Republic attempted to expand into neighboring rural areas, and sympathetic peasants did join the cause, but these units were defeated by much larger Austrian armies, which also had broad support among the peasants. On March 3, Russia occupied the city and passed it back to Austria. Roughly 1,200 people were arrested and approximately 100 were imprisoned in the Kufstein Fortress. The Austrian Empire captured Tyssowski who surrendered to the occupying forces, and allowed him to emigrate.

He was exiled from Austria and emigrated to the United States in 1847, where he became a Polonia activist in New York City. He published a newspaper and became part-owner of the Deutsche Schnellpost, a German-language daily with socialist leanings. He attempted to gain support from the German American community in joining the cause for Polish liberation. He worked for the United States government as a second class clerk and later assistant examiner for the US Patent Office. He is buried at Glenwood Cemetery in Washington D.C.

== Sources ==
- M. Neomisia Rutkowska. John Tyssowski. Polish Roman Catholic Union of America. 1943.
