= Fanny Halpern =

Austrian Jewish neuropsychiatrist working in China

- Born: Fanny-Gisela Halpern; August 1, 1899; Grand Duchy of Kraków, Austria-Hungary
- Died: June 26, 1952 (aged 52)
- Education: University of Vienna
- Known for: first psychiatric hospital in Shanghai
- Medical career
- Field: Neuropsychiatrist
- Institutions: Shanghai Puci Sanatorium

Fanny-Gisela Halpern (August 1, 1899 – June 26, 1952) was an Austrian Jewish neuropsychiatrist. Halpern spent the majority of her life in China and is known for her contribution to the first psychiatric hospital in Shanghai, China. She created mental health awareness in China by creating a psychiatric hospital that is still active today. Halpern dedicated her career to help people with mental health disorders.

== Early life ==
Halpern was born in Krakrow, Poland on August 1, 1899, and died on June, 26 1952. She had a military father, his name was Simon Halpern. Her mother was Rosaline Halpern. She studied medicine at the University of Vienna located in Vienna, Austria and graduated in 1924. After graduating, she became a neuropsychiatrist.

== Career in Shanghai ==
Halpern spent the majority of her career in Shanghai, China and most of her contributions were there. After graduating in 1924, she started her career by working with Nobel laureate psychiatrist Julius Wagner-Jauregg who received the Nobel Prize for developing the malarial treatment of syphilis, and other researchers in Vienna, Austria. Then, in 1933, Halpern was invited by the president of the National Medical College in Shanghai to work as a professor of psychiatry and neurology. In 1935, she collaborated with Lu Bohong (local philanthropist) and local elites to open the first psychiatric hospital in Shanghai. Lu Bohong collaborated with the local government to fund the psychiatric institution. Halpern made sure Shanghainese people with mental health conditions had access of care since few institutions existed in the 1930s that cared for psychiatrically ill patients.

=== Shanghai Puci Sanatorium ===
Shanghai Puci Sanatorium, now known as Shanghai Mental Health Center, was the first psychiatric hospital in Shanghai. This hospital was founded by Halpern and Lu Bohong. The hospital focused on treating patients with mental health disorders. It allowed walk-in patients and also took appointments. This hospital also made it possible to allow family visitations and stay on site. The hospital included the latest treatments for patients for conditions such as: neurasthenia, which needed the latest medication in order to be treated.

== Vision ==
Halpern envisioned psychotherapy clinics and special schools that would connect social maladjustments early on. She wanted to bring awareness on mental hygiene, which was originally a biomedical concept and originated in the U.S. in the early 1900s. Mental hygiene embodies humanitarian concern for the well-being of people with mental health conditions and authoritarian desire for public order and control. Dr. Halpern wanted to make sure she treated members of all nations and all classes of society equally. When Halpern contributed with the founding of Shanghai Puci Sanatorium, she wanted a hospital that could offer preventative and longitudinal psychiatric services.

== Influences ==
Halpern's influences were all women who studied with her at the University of Vienna. Alexandra Adler, Edith Klemperer, Lydia Sicher and Edith Vincze were among the first women to study neurology and psychiatry both in Austria and overseas. They all moved to the United States to pursue their academic careers after having to leave Austria in the 1930s to escape from the National Socialist Regime. They all pursued their careers in the United States except for Halpern who moved to Shanghai, China for 18 years where she laid foundation of modern Chinese psychiatry.
