= Sicher =

Sicher is a surname of German origin. Notable people with the surname include:

- Efraim Sicher, Israeli literary scholar
- Fridolin Sicher (1490–1546), Swiss composer and organist
- Gustav Sicher (1880–1960), Czech rabbi
- Lydia Sicher (1890–1962), Austrian-born medical doctor and psychologist

== See also ==
- Sacher, another surname
- Sucher, another surname
