= Free City of Cracow =

Polish city state (1815–1846)

Coordinates: 50°3′42″N 19°56′14″E

Free, Independent, and Strictly Neutral City of Cracow and its District Wolne, Niepodległe i Ściśle Neutralne Miasto Kraków i jego Okręg (Polish)
- 1815–1846
- Flag Coat of arms

- Location of the Free, Independent, and Strictly Neutral City of Cracow with its Territory within Europe

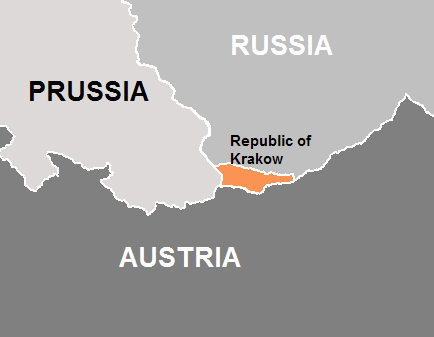
- Territory of the Free, Independent, and Strictly Neutral City of Cracow with its Territory (orange) and its three neighbours (Kingdom of Prussia, Austrian Empire and Russian Empire)
- Status: City-state and protectorate of Austria, Prussia, and Russia
- Capital: Cracow (Kraków)
- Common languages: Polish (official); Yiddish; German; Russian
- Religion: Roman Catholic (85%); Judaism (14%); Others (1%)
- Government: Constitutional republic
- President of the Senate
  - 1815–1831: Stanisław Wodzicki
- Legislature: Assembly of Representatives (Kraków)
- History
  - Established: 3 May 1815
  - November Uprising: 29 November 1830
  - Kraków Uprising: 16 November 1846

Area
  - Total: 1,188.8 km^{2} (459.0 sq mi)
- Currency: Polish zloty (to 1835); Kraków złoty (from 1835)
Preceded by	Succeeded by
Duchy of Warsaw	Grand Duchy of Kraków; Kingdom of Galicia and Lodomeria
- Today part of: Poland

The Free City of Cracow (Polish: Wolne Miasto Kraków), also known as the Republic of Cracow (Polish: Rzeczpospolita Krakowska), and officially the Free, Independent, and Strictly Neutral City of Cracow and its District, (Note: Polish: Wolne, Niepodległe i Ściśle Neutralne Miasto Kraków i jego Okręg) (Note: The Polish variant of name Kraków is occasionally retroactively applied in English to the historical Free City.) was a nominally independent city-state that existed from 1815 to 1846. It was established by the Congress of Vienna using territory from the former Duchy of Warsaw, which had been divided among the Russian, Prussian and Austrian empires after the Congress in 1815. The Free City comprised the Polish city of Cracow (Kraków) and its surrounding district.

Although formally autonomous, the Free City was jointly overseen by its three more powerful neighbours: Russia, Prussia and Austria. It served as a centre of political and intellectual activity promoting Polish independence. In 1846, after the failed Kraków Uprising, Austria unilaterally annexed the city-state and brought it under direct control.

The Free City of Cracow had a population that was predominantly Polish-speaking and overwhelmingly Catholic. Approximately 85% were Catholics, 14% were Jews, and members of other faiths made up less than 1%. In the years following the dissolution of the Free City, the Jewish population in Cracow itself grew substantially, reaching nearly 40%, though the remainder continued to be almost entirely Polish-speaking Catholics.

== History ==
The Free City was approved and guaranteed by Article VII of the Treaty between Austria, Prussia, and Russia of 3 May 1815. The statelet received an initial constitution at the same time, revised and expanded in 1818, establishing significant autonomy for the city. The Jagiellonian University could accept students from the partitioned territory of Poland. The Free City thus became a centre of Polish political activity on the territories of partitioned Poland.

During the November Uprising of 1830–1831, Kraków was a base for the smuggling of weapons into the Russian-controlled Kingdom of Poland. After the end of the uprising, the autonomy of the Free City was severely restricted. The police were controlled by Austria and the election of the president had to be approved by all three powers. Cracow was subsequently occupied by the Austrian army from 1836 to 1841. After the unsuccessful Kraków uprising of 1846, the Free City was annexed by Austria on 16 November 1846 as the Grand Duchy of Kraków.

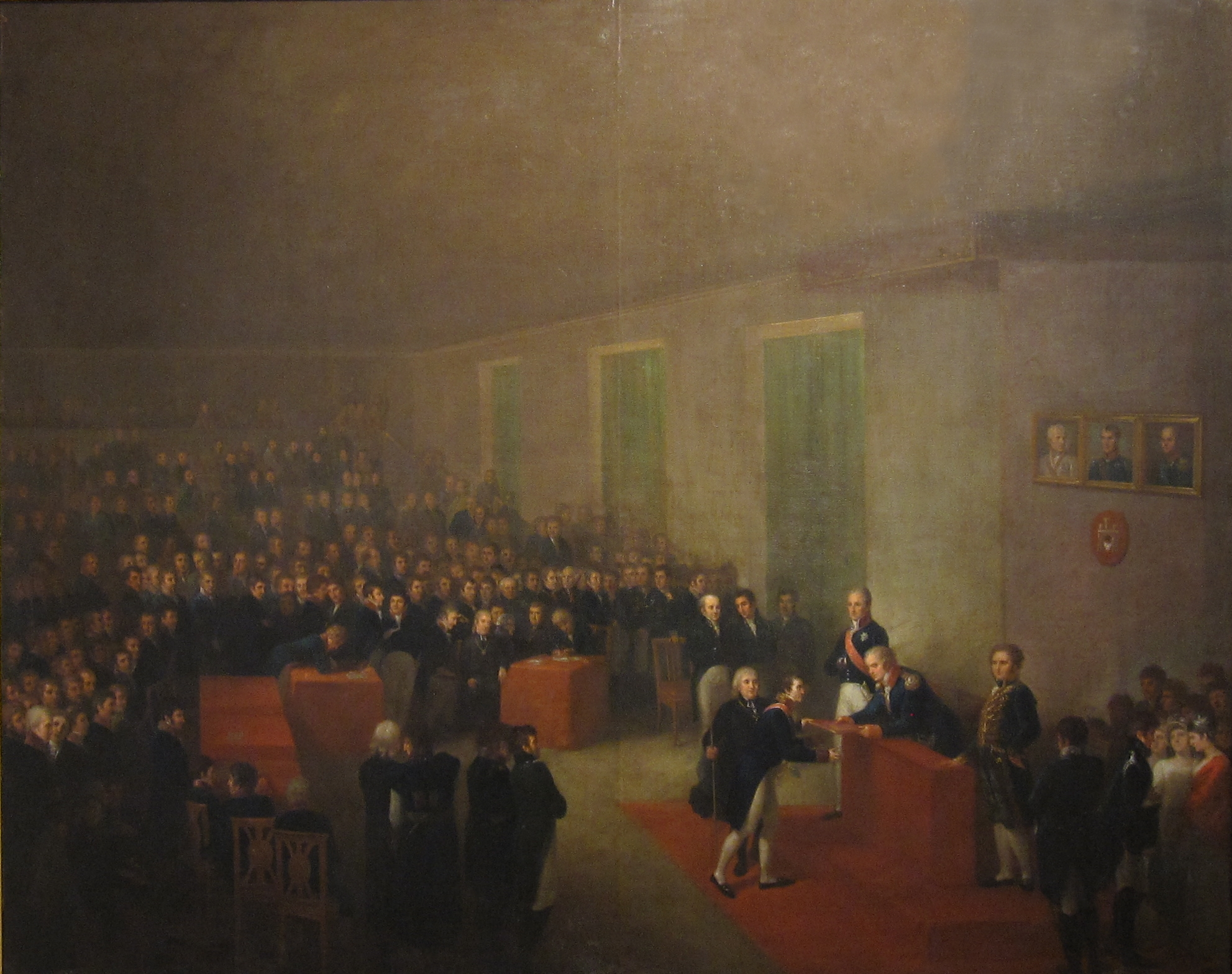
Granting of the constitution of the Free City of Kraków, 1815–1818, painting from the mid-19th century.

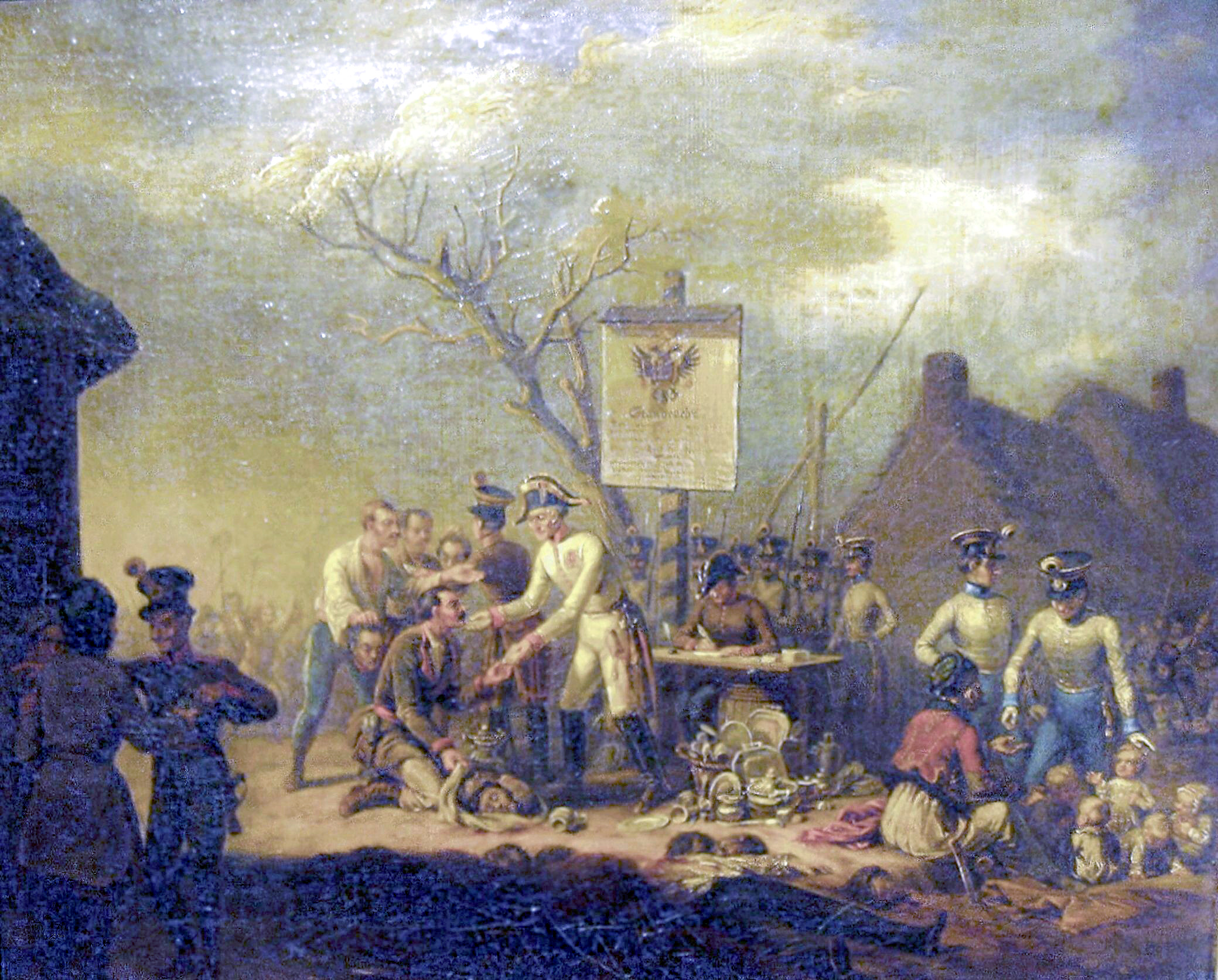
Galician slaughter (Polish: Rzeź galicyjska) by Jan Lewicki (1795–1871).

== Geography, population and economy ==
The Free City of Cracow was created from the southwest part of the Duchy of Warsaw (part of the former Kraków Department on the left bank of the Vistula river). At its smallest, the city encompassed an area of 1,164 to 1,234 km^{2} (sources vary). It bordered the Russian Empire, the Kingdom of Prussia and the Austrian Empire. It comprised the city of Kraków and its environs; the other settlements in the area administered by the Free City included 224 villages and three towns (Chrzanów, Trzebinia and Nowa Góra).

In 1815, its population was 95,000; as of 1843, it had a population of 146,000. 85% of them were Catholics, 14% Jews, while other religions comprised 1%. The most notable szlachta family was the Potocki family of magnates, who had a mansion in Krzeszowice.

The Free City was a duty-free area, allowed to trade with Russia, Prussia and Austria. In addition to no duties, it had very low taxes, and various economic privileges were granted by the neighbouring powers. As such, it became one of the European centres of economic liberalism and supporters of laissez-faire, attracting new enterprises and immigrants, which resulted in impressive growth of the city. Weavers from Prussian Silesia had often used the Free City as a contraband outlet to avoid tariff barriers along the borders of Austria and the Kingdom of Poland, but with Austria's annexation of the Free City came a significant drop in Prussian textile exports.

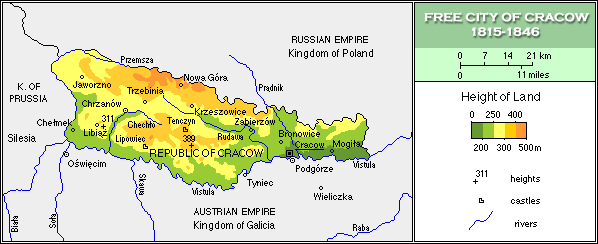
Free City of Kraków, 1815–1846.

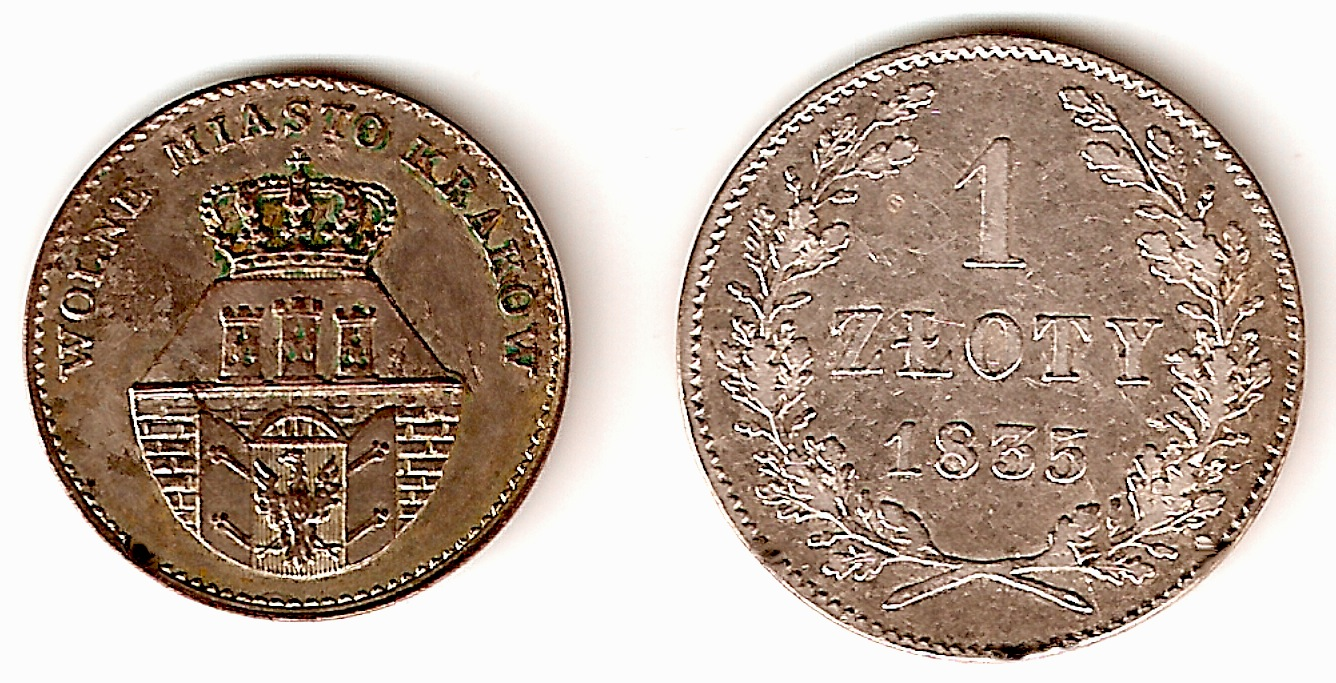
5 groszy coin displaying the coat of arms of the Free City, and 1 złoty coin of 1835.

== Politics ==
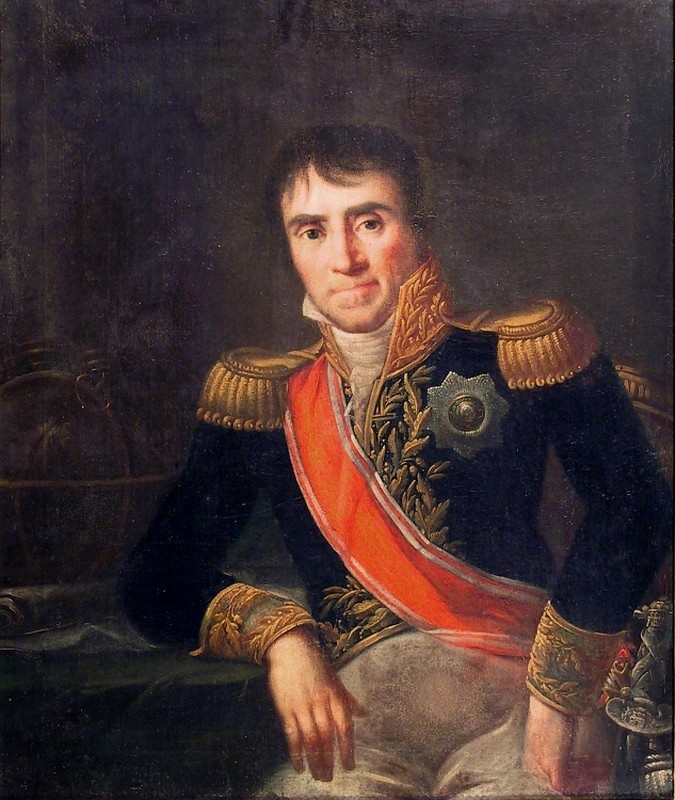
Stanisław Wodzicki, first President of the Senate 1815–1831.

The free city received an initial constitution in 1815, which had mainly been devised by Prince Adam Jerzy Czartoryski. The constitution was revised and expanded in 1818, establishing significant autonomy for the city. Legislative power was vested in the Assembly of Representatives (Izba Reprezentantów), and the executive power was given to a Governing Senate.

In 1833, in the aftermath of the November Uprising and the foiled plan by some Polish activists to start an uprising in Cracow, the partitioning powers issued a new, much more restrictive constitution: the number of senators and deputies was lowered and their competences limited, while the commissars of the partitioning powers had their competences expanded. Freedom of the press was also curtailed. In 1835, a secret treaty between the three partitioning powers presented a plan in which in case of additional Polish unrest, Austria was given the right to occupy and annex the city. That would take place after the Kraków Uprising of 1846.

The law was based on the Napoleonic Code and French commercial and criminal law. The official language was Polish. In 1836, the local police force was disbanded and replaced by Austrian police; in 1837, the partitioning powers curtailed the competencies of the local courts, which refused to bow down to their demands.

The Free City of Cracow was the first purely republican government in the history of Poland.

== See also ==
- History of Poland (1795–1918)
- Former countries in Europe after 1815
- Kingdom of Galicia and Lodomeria
- Grand Duchy of Krakow
- Galician slaughter

== Bibliography ==
- Degan, Vladimir Đuro (1997), Developments in International Law: Sources of International, Developments in International Law Series, vol. 27 (illustrated ed.), Martinus Nijhoff Publishers, p. 378, ISBN 9789041104212
- Feuchtwanger, E. J. (1970), Prussia: Myth and Reality, Chicago: Henry Regnery Company, p. 262, ISBN 0-85496-108-9
- Hertslet, Edward (1875), "No.15", The map of Europe by treaty; showing the various political and territorial changes which have taken place since the general peace of 1814, London: Butterworths, p. 127
