= Stanisław Wodzicki =

Polish general, politician, and poet

Count Stanisław Wodzicki
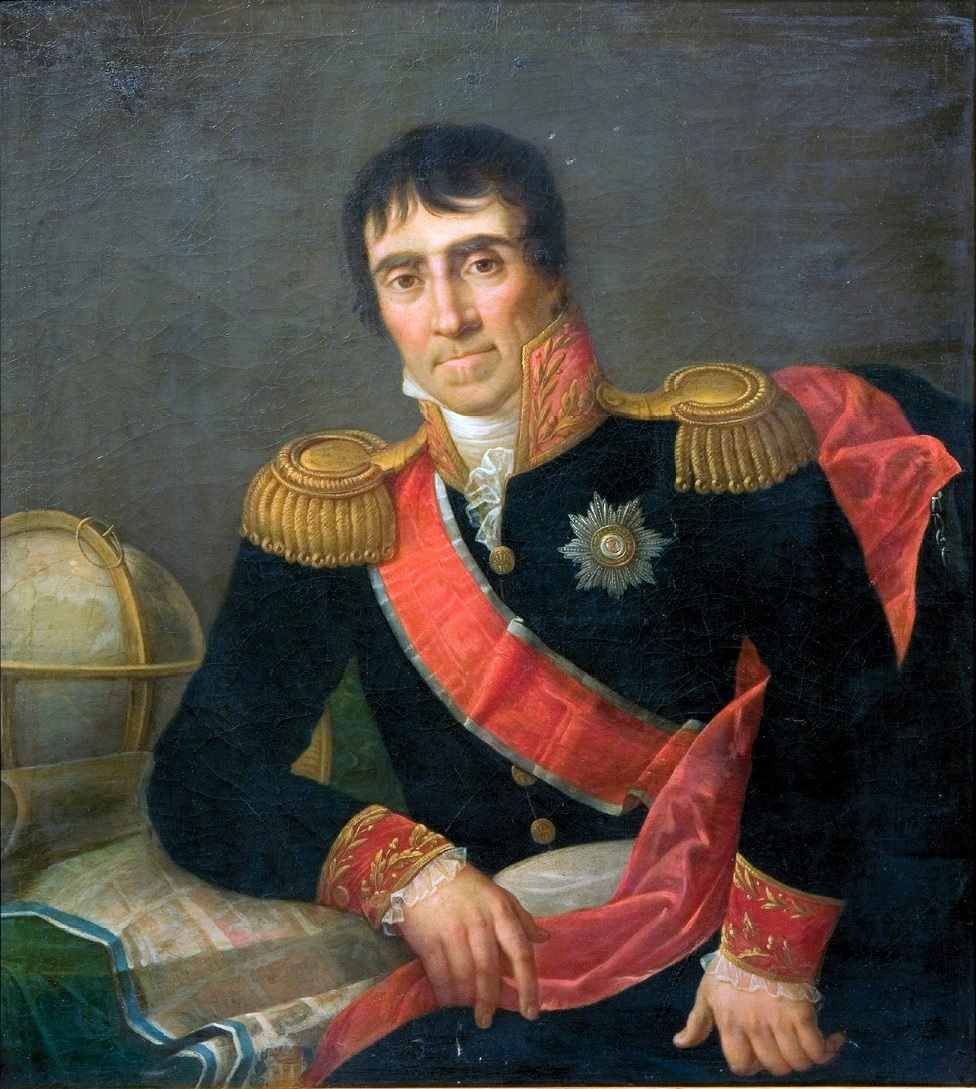
- Portrait by Józef Brodowski the Elder, 1817

1st President of the Senate of the Free City of Kraków
- In office 2 November 1815 – 19 January 1831
- Preceded by: Office established
- Succeeded by: Józef Nikorowicz

Personal details
- Born: Stanisław Karol Piotr Cyprian Wodzicki; 17 July 1764 Rogów, Lesser Poland, Polish–Lithuanian Commonwealth
- Died: 14 March 1843 (aged 78) Free City of Kraków (Kraków)
- Spouse: Anna Jabłonowska
- Occupation: Military officer, politician, botanist, poet

Military service
- Allegiance: Poland–Lithuania; Duchy of Warsaw; Russian Empire; Free City of Kraków
- Rank: General
- Battles/wars: Kościuszko Uprising; November Uprising (POW)

Stanisław Karol Piotr Cyprian Wodzicki (17 July 1764 – 14 March 1843) was a Polish noble, military officer, politician, botanist, and poet who was the first president of the Senate of the Free City of Kraków from 1815 to 1831.

== Biography ==
Stanisław Karol Piotr Cyprian Wodzicki was born on 17 July 1764 in Rogów, Lesser Poland, then a part of the Polish–Lithuanian Commonwealth. His father was Franciszek Wodzicki, the count of Galicia from 1800 to 1804, and his mother was Zofia Krasińska. He was given the title of marszałek in 1766.

Wodzicki studied law in Lwów and participated in the Kościuszko Uprising. Wodzicki was the civil and military commissioner of Sandomierz and Wiślica from 1789 to 1795. He was a conservative politician. He was the chief of police of Kraków in 1809. He was the prefect of the Kraków Department of the Duchy of Warsaw from 5 September 1810 to 1813. He was appointed as the president of the Senate of the Free City of Kraków on 2 November 1815. During Wodzicki's presidency, he implemented pro-Russia policies, established the Kraków Scientific Society, and oversaw the construction of the Kościuszko Mound. For opposing the November Uprising, Wodzicki was arrested by the National Government and resigned as president of the Senate on 19 January 1831.

Wodzicki left Kraków after his resignation and became a botanist. Wodzicki was made a count of the Russian Empire on 2 July 1842. He died in Kraków on 14 March 1843. He was buried at the Wawel Cathedral in Kraków.

== Personal life ==
Wodzicki married Anna Jabłonowska. The couple had eight children, two sons and six daughters. Among his children included Count Franciszek Ludwik Wodzicki.

== Awards and decorations ==
Russian Empire

- Knight of the Order of Saint Stanislaus (1812)

== See also ==
- List of Polish generals

Political offices
New office	President of the Senate of the Free City of Cracow; 1815–1831	Succeeded by Józef Nikorowicz
