= Lajkonik =

Unofficial symbol of Kraków, Poland

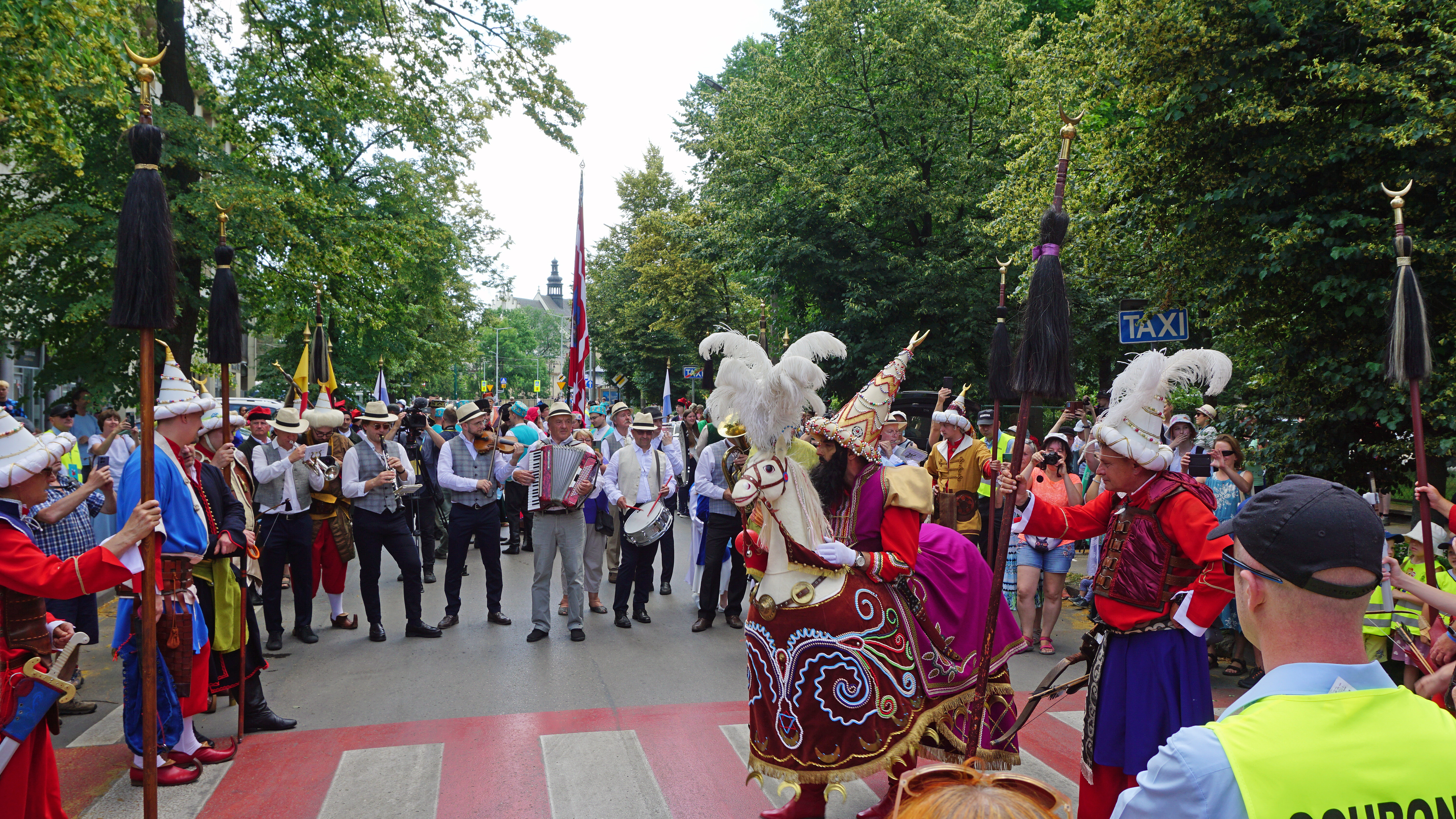
Lajkonik fete 2025, Senatorska street, Kraków

The Lajkonik is one of the unofficial symbols of the city of Kraków, Poland. It is represented as a bearded man resembling a Tatar in a characteristic pointed hat, dressed in Mongol attire, with a wooden horse around his waist (hobby horse). It is the subject of the Lajkonik Festival (Polish: Lajkoniki) that takes place each year on the first Thursday after the religious holiday of Corpus Christi.

== Origin ==
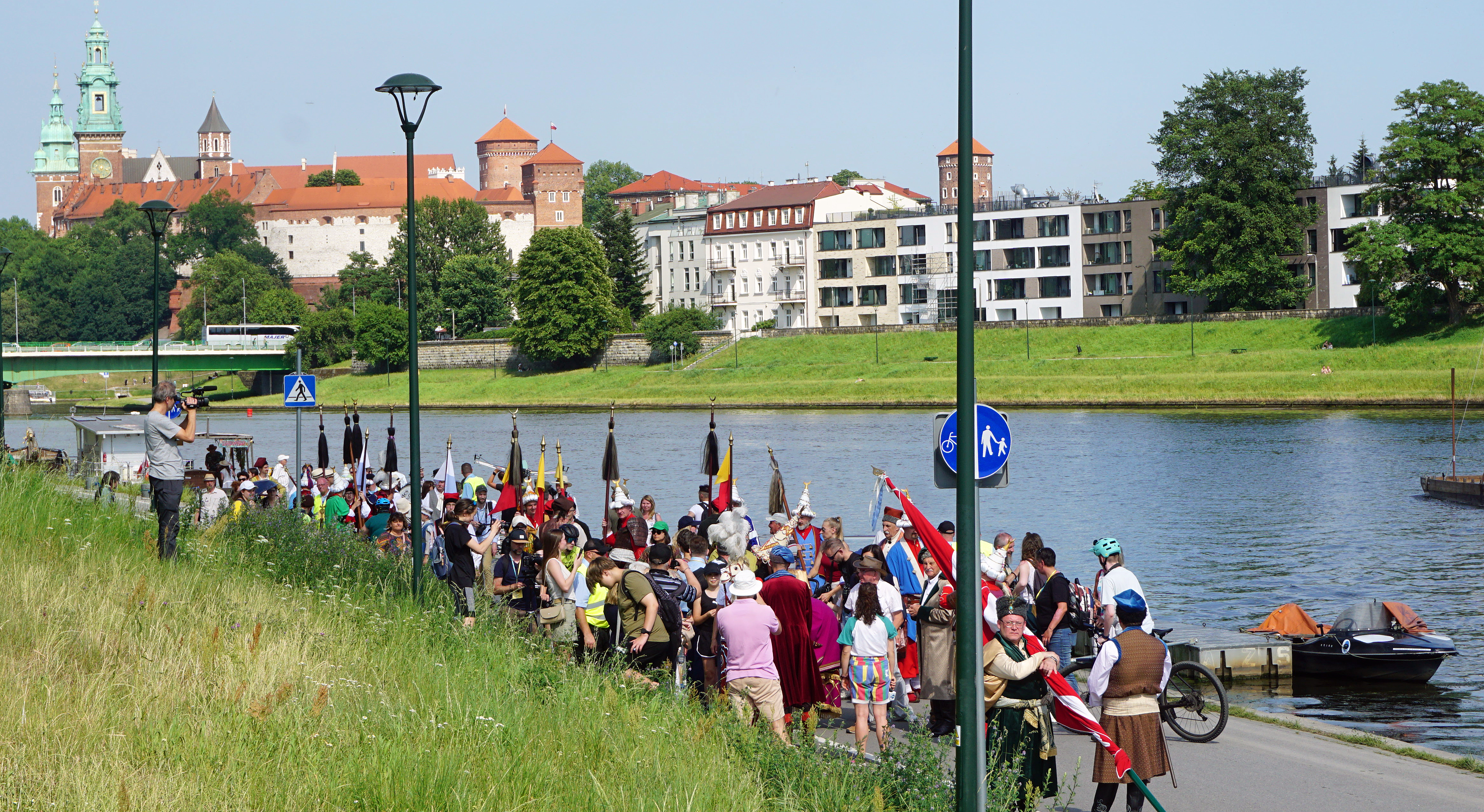
Lajkonik fete 2025, Rodła boulevard by Vistula river

The origin of the Lajkonik is uncertain, but there are some common stories associated with its popularity. Some think that it originated in pre-Christian times when it was believed that in the spring the horse brought good luck and high crop yields.

Other stories are associated from the 13th century, when the city was attacked during the Mongol invasion of Poland. One story says that the people of Kraków successfully repelled the Tatar invasion. Because they killed one of the leaders, a Tatar Khan, the victorious defenders dressed up in the Khan’s clothing and triumphantly rode into the city.

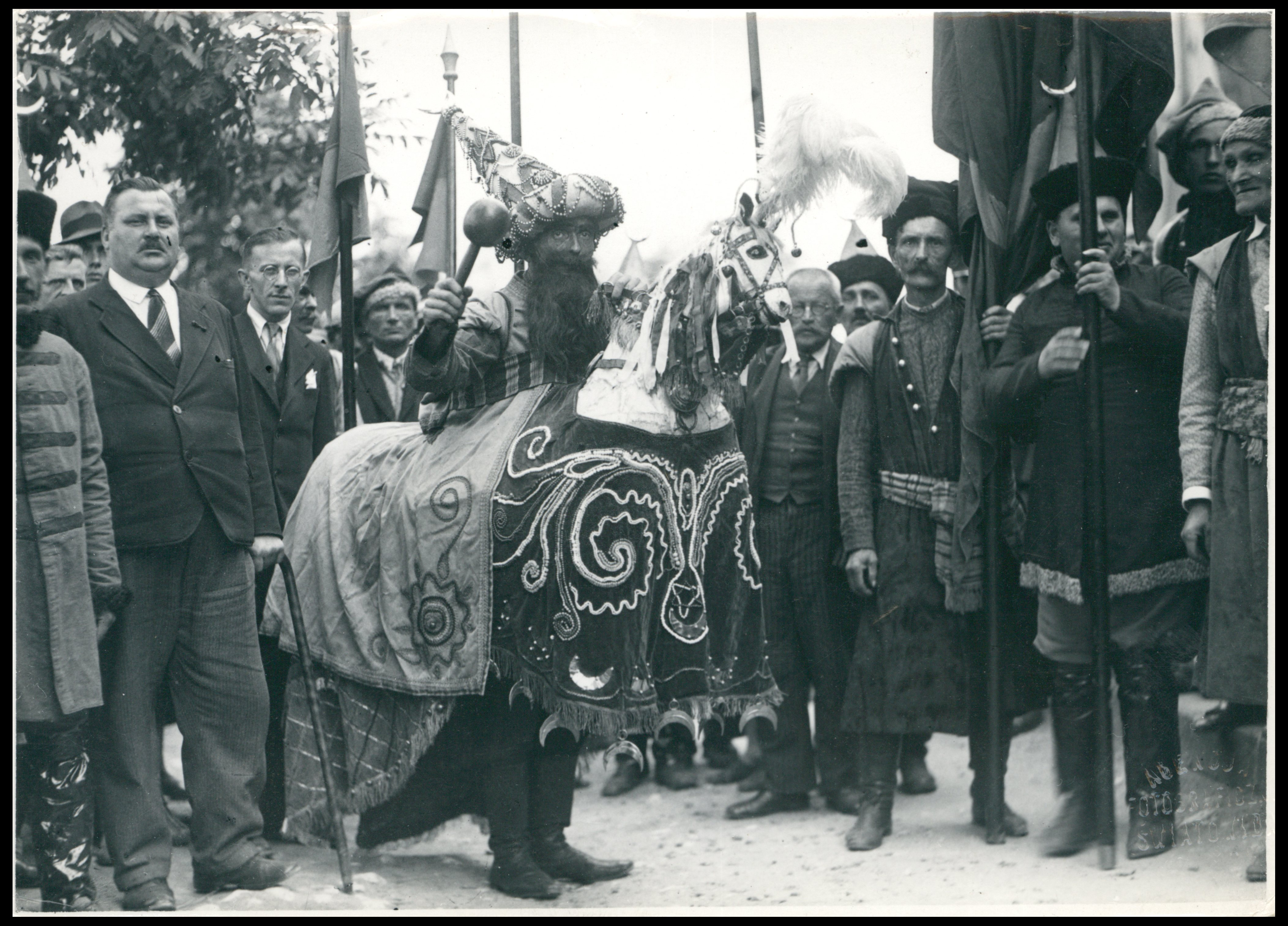
Lajkonik, 1939

Another version recalls that the Tatars arrived at the city gates at night in 1287, but chose not to attack the city until morning and instead camped along the Vistula. Some locals transporting wood on the river saw them and decided to play a joke on the city. They entered the city gates and dressed up like Tatars on horses trying to scare people into thinking the gates were breached. To the relief of the people of the city their true identity was soon discovered and the incident's popularity led the mayor to declare this to be an annual celebration.

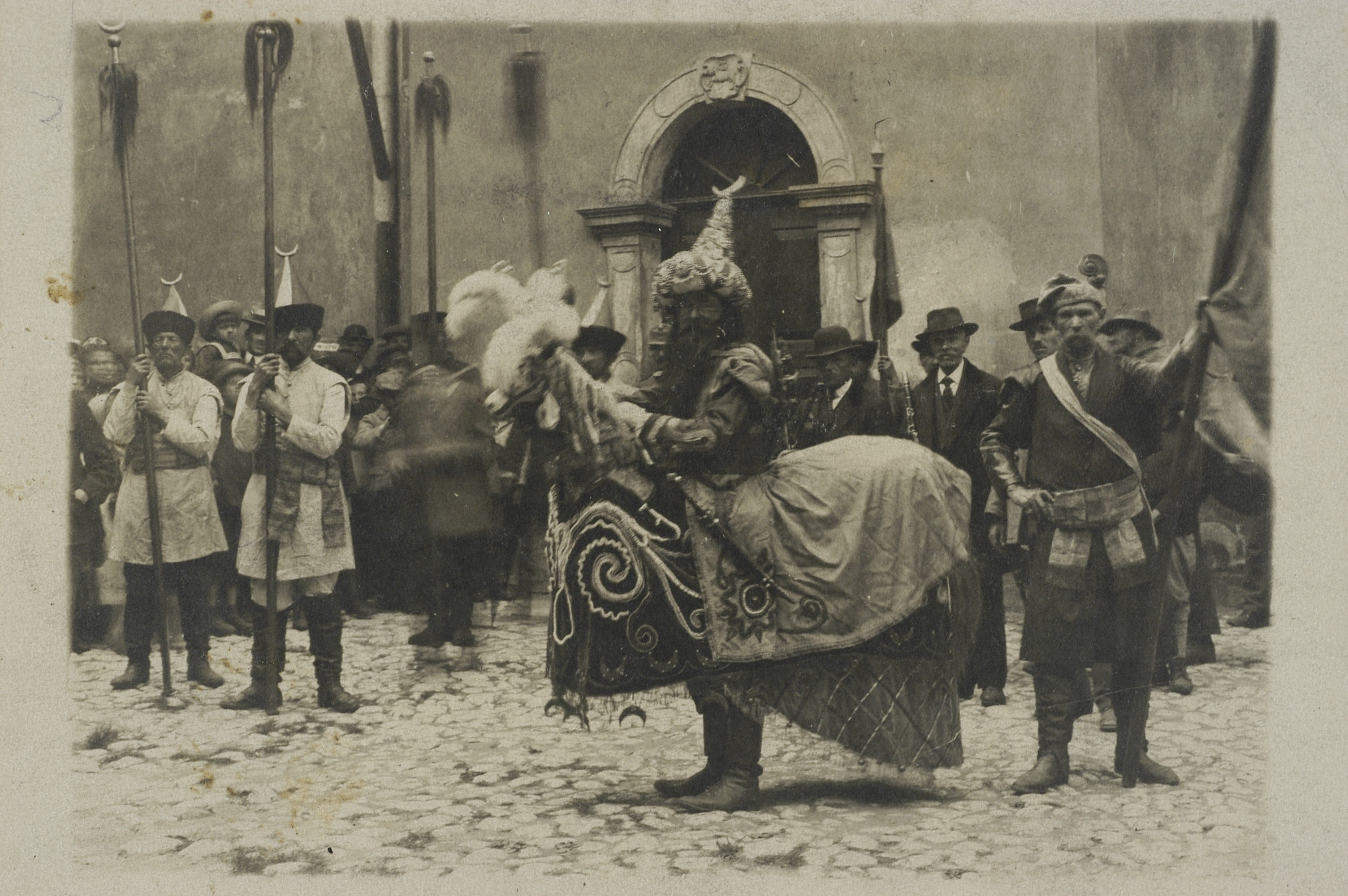
Lajkonik, Corpus Christi, 1939

== History ==
"On Ash Wednesday, 10 March 1241, Tatars ravaged Sandomierz and crossed the Vistula to Kraków. The dukes of Sandomierz and Opole joined battle briefly before retreating. At Legnica the Silesian duke Henry II the Pious, intercepted the invaders only to perish with his knights... The Tatars returned to ravage southern Poland again in 1259 and 1287 and the threat they posed dominated central and east European political and religious life for the next 200 years or so... In regional folklore the Tatar assumed the position of bogeyman, as the Kraków Corpus Christi "Lajkonik" procession colorfully reminds one"

== Festival ==
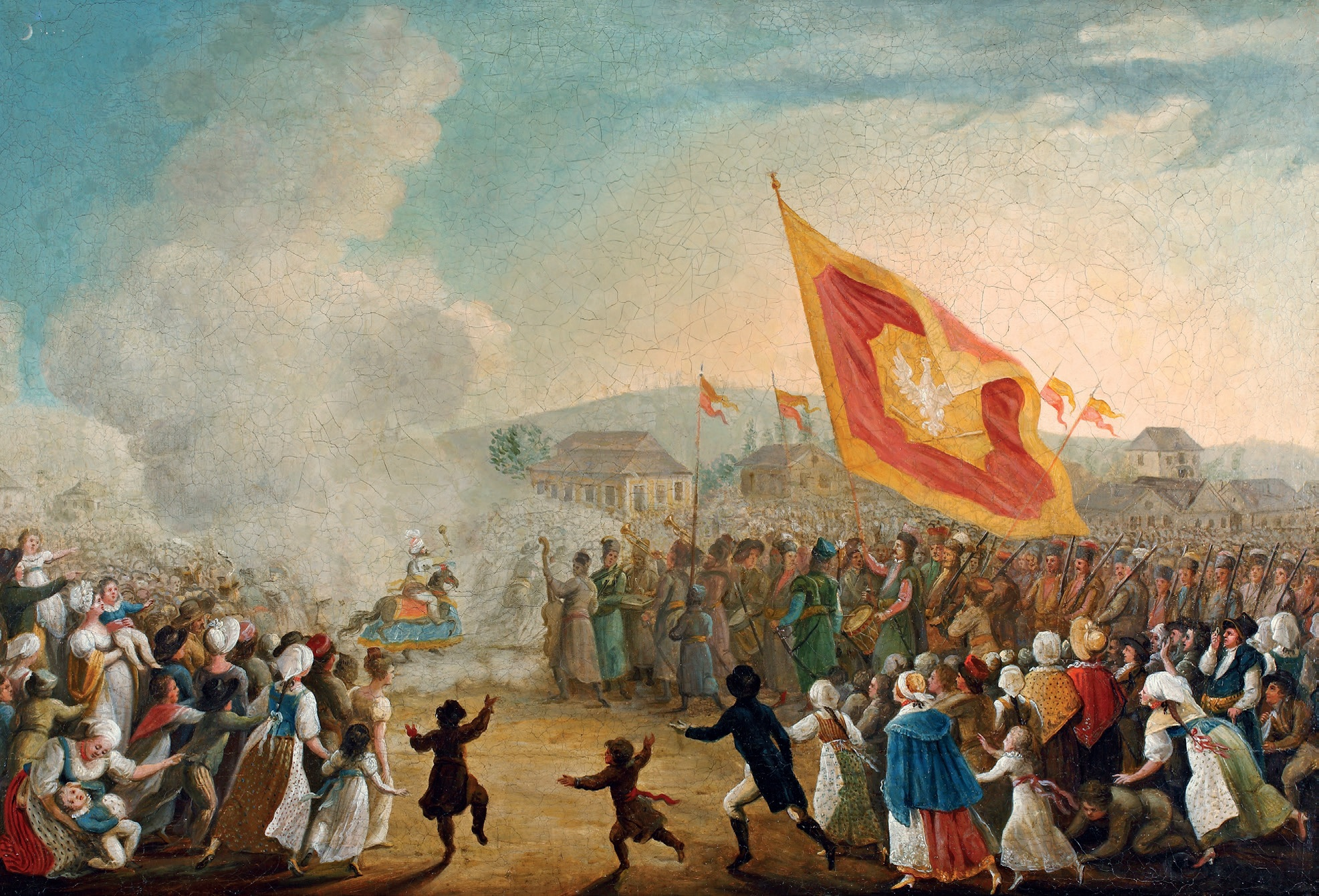
Painting of the Lajkonik celebrations from 1818 by Michał Stachowicz

Whatever the origin, the city continues the tradition with a festival that has taken place every June for the past 700 years. The Lajkonik is a man dressed up as a warrior from the East. He rides a prancing white hobbyhorse through the city streets from the Premonstratensian (Norbertine) Convent in Zwierzyniec to the Main Market Square. People in traditional folklore dress accompany him while others are adorned in oriental garments and hold horsetail insignia in their hands. The procession winds its way through the historic streets of the city, followed by musicians, children, and revelers. On his way, the Lajkonik touches spectators with his golden mace and collects money for the traditional ransom. Being touched by the Lajkonik's mace is believed to bring good luck. At the Market Square, the mayor of the city awaits the Lajkonik with a pile of ransom money and a chalice with which they make a toast to the wellbeing of Kraków and its inhabitants. Music and dancing continues in front of the Old Tower Hall at the Main Square.

== Everyday ==
Some Polish folk groups use the figure of the Lajkonik in their performances. The costume of the Lajkonik is worn also by street disguisers as a tourist attraction. However, the true Lajkonik is only the one at the festival on the first Thursday after Corpus Christi.

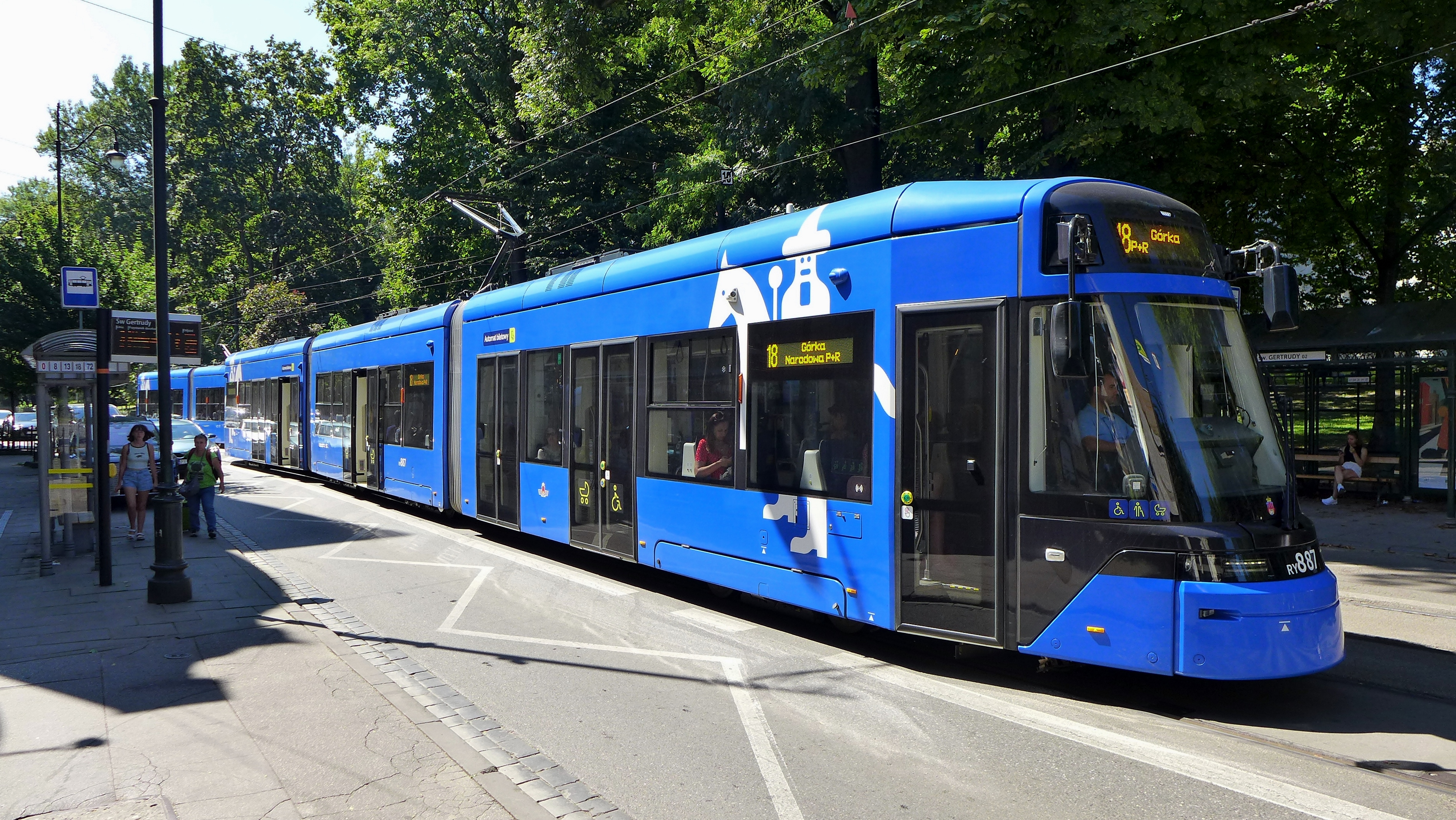
Lajkonik image on a Stadler Tango tram in Kraków

There are numerous souvenirs and folk art items depicting the Lajkonik.

The Lajkonik is so popular that the name has become a trade name for numerous products sold in Poland and abroad, including hotels (), snacks ().

Lajkonik is also the name of a brand of Polish snack manufacturers based in Skawina.

Since 2012, seats in public transport in Kraków are upholstered in a Lajkonik pattern.

== Lajkonik Polish dancing groups ==
There are numerous folk dance groups in Poland named after Lajkonik. In the United States, two groups based in Tucson and Chicago have also adopted the folk figure's name. There is one dance ensemble in Western Sydney called Lajkonik.

== See also ==
- Symbols of Kraków
- Culture of Kraków
- Hejnał mariacki
- Wawel Castle
