= Kraków złoty =

Currency of the Free City of Cracow ( Krákow )

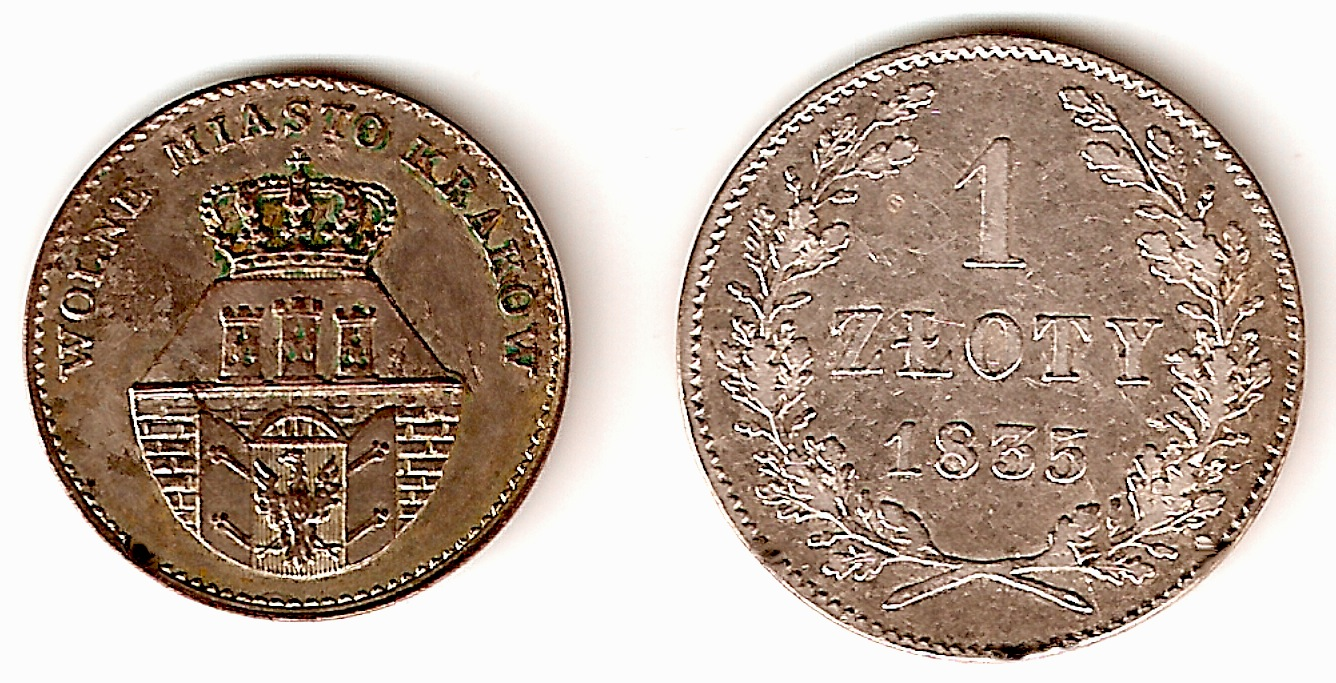
- obverse of a 5 groszy and reverse of a 1 złoty coins

Units of account
- Plural: groszy
- Subunit
- 1/30: grosz

Denominations
- Coins: 3, 5, 10 groszy, 1 złoty

Demographics
- User(s): Free City of Kraków
- This infobox shows the latest status before this currency was rendered obsolete.

The Polish White Eagle in the coat of arms of the Free City of Kraków

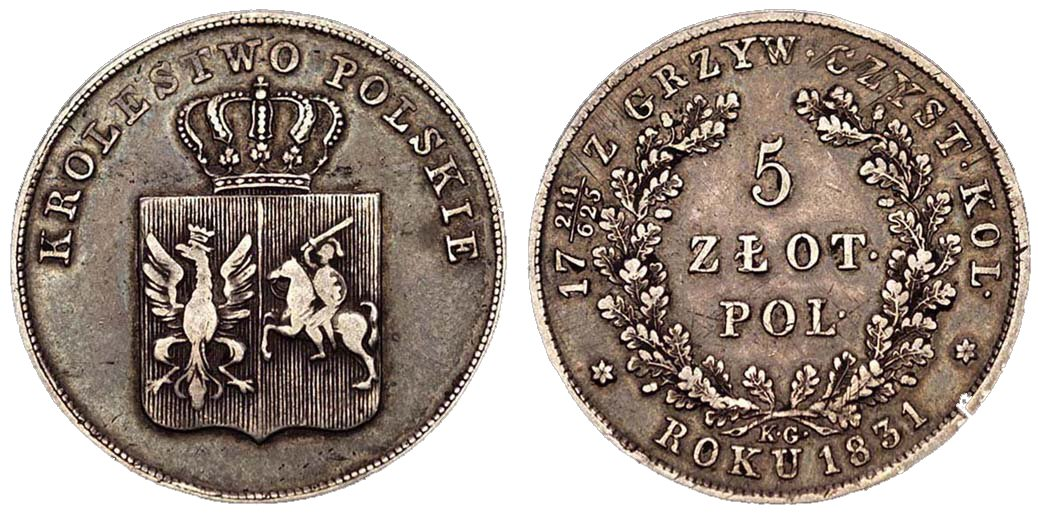
The Polish złoty issued in 1831 during the November Uprising. Design of the Kraków złoty mirrors a significant resemblance to the Polish złoty

The Kraków złoty (Polish: złotówka krakowska) was a currency issued in the independent Free City of Cracow in 1835. It was subdivided into 30 groszy. The coins were minted in the Imperial Mint in Vienna.

== A history of the currency ==
The Free City of Kraków created in 1815 by the Congress of Vienna was granted the right to introduce its own currency but it chose to enter the monetary union with the Kingdom of Poland and did not implement the right to introduce its own currency until 1835. Between 1815 and 1835 the złoty of the Congress Kingdom of Poland was the official currency of the Free City of Kraków. During the November Uprising also the złoty introduced by the revolutionary government in the Kingdom of Poland was in circulation in the Free City. Its obverse featured the crowned coat of arms consisting of the Polish White Eagle and Lithuanian Vytis, replacing earlier used Russian two-headed eagle with an escutcheon with the Polish White Eagle on its chest. Following the defeat of the Polish army in the November Uprising (1831), the Russian government decided to remove an effigy of the Polish eagle from the currency of the Congress Kingdom of Poland, replacing it with the Russian two-headed eagle. This move of the Russians made the government of the Free City of Kraków to protest, under the pressure exercised by its own citizens who refused to accept the new coins, by introducing its own currency featuring the Polish White Eagle (which constituted a part of the arms of the Free City). The new currency was to circulate in Kraków alongside the Polish złoty. In 1835 three coins of the new currency, the Kraków złoty, were released into circulation in following denominations:

- 5 groszy (silver, weight 1.45 g, mintage 180.000 pieces)
- 10 groszy (silver, weight 2.90 g, mintage 150.000 pieces)
- 1 złoty (silver, weight 3.30 g, mintage 20.000 pieces).

Further two coins were supposed to be released later, namely 3 grosze (copper) and 2 złote (silver), but the annexation of the Free City of Cracow by Austria in 1846 thwarted such plans. The Free City introduced only its own coins and continued to use the banknotes of the Congress Kingdom of Poland. The Kraków złoty was equivalent to the Polish in the Russian-controlled Congress Kingdom, which had a fixed exchange rate to the Russian currencies of 1 kopeck = 2 grosze, or 0.15 ruble = 1 złoty. Following the annexation of Kraków by Austria in 1846 the Kraków złoty remained in circulation until the end of 1847 when it was replaced by Austro-Hungarian florin. The exchange rate was 1 florin=4 złote 12 groszy. Nowadays, due to a small number of coins minted and a relatively short circulation period (only twelve years), the Cracow złoty is an extremely rare collectible much coveted by collectors. The buying power of the Kraków złoty can be illustrated by the following example taken from an 1845 carpenter's bill:

- a table with a drawer - 18 zł.
- 12 chairs - 175 zł.
- a desk with two drawers - 48 zł.

== The design ==
The author of the design remains unknown, but the coins were clearly styled on coins introduced in the Congress Kingdom of Poland by the revolutionary government in 1831 (see the picture).

=== The obverse ===
The obverse of all three coins is identical and features the crowned coat of arms of the Free City of Kraków (the city gates wide open, topped with three towers and featuring the Polish White Eagle in the centre of the gate) with the name of the city-state in Polish placed above the coat of arms in semi-circle: WOLNE MIASTO KRAKOW.

=== The reverse ===
The reverse follows an identical pattern differing only in size and the denomination. It features an oak wreath surrounding the denomination and the year (1835).

For an earlier coin of Kraków, issued in the 14th century, see Kraków grosz.
