= Edith Klemperer =

Austrian-American psychiatrist (1898–1987)

Dr. Edith Klemperer
- Born: August 9, 1898; Vienna
- Died: September 23, 1987 (aged 89); New York
- Education: M.D.
- Alma mater: University of Vienna
- Known for: Electric Brain Model; Research in Blood Chemistry and Psychiatry; Hypnotherapy
- Scientific career
- Fields: Neurology and Psychiatry; Hypnotherapy
- Workplaces: University of Vienna, Bellevue Hospital

Edith Klemperer (August 9, 1898 – September 23, 1987), born and educated in Vienna, Austria, was one of the first women to practice neurology and psychiatry. In the U.S., she became a pioneer in the psychotherapeutic use of hypnosis. She earned her medical degree in 1923 from the Medical University of Vienna.

Continuing her research there, Dr. Klemperer was one of six women physicians working for Julius Wagner-Jauregg in 1927, when he won the Nobel Prize in Physiology or Medicine. All six women being of Jewish descent, they were forced to flee Austria under the Nazis. Among them were Drs. Alexandra Adler, one of the first women neurologists at Harvard University; Fanny Halpern, co-founder of the first psychiatric hospital in Shanghai; and Annie Reich, a leading psychoanalyst in post-war New York.

In the 1930s, Wagner-Jauregg, their employer, embraced ideas of racial hygiene and eugenics, becoming a fervent Nazi.

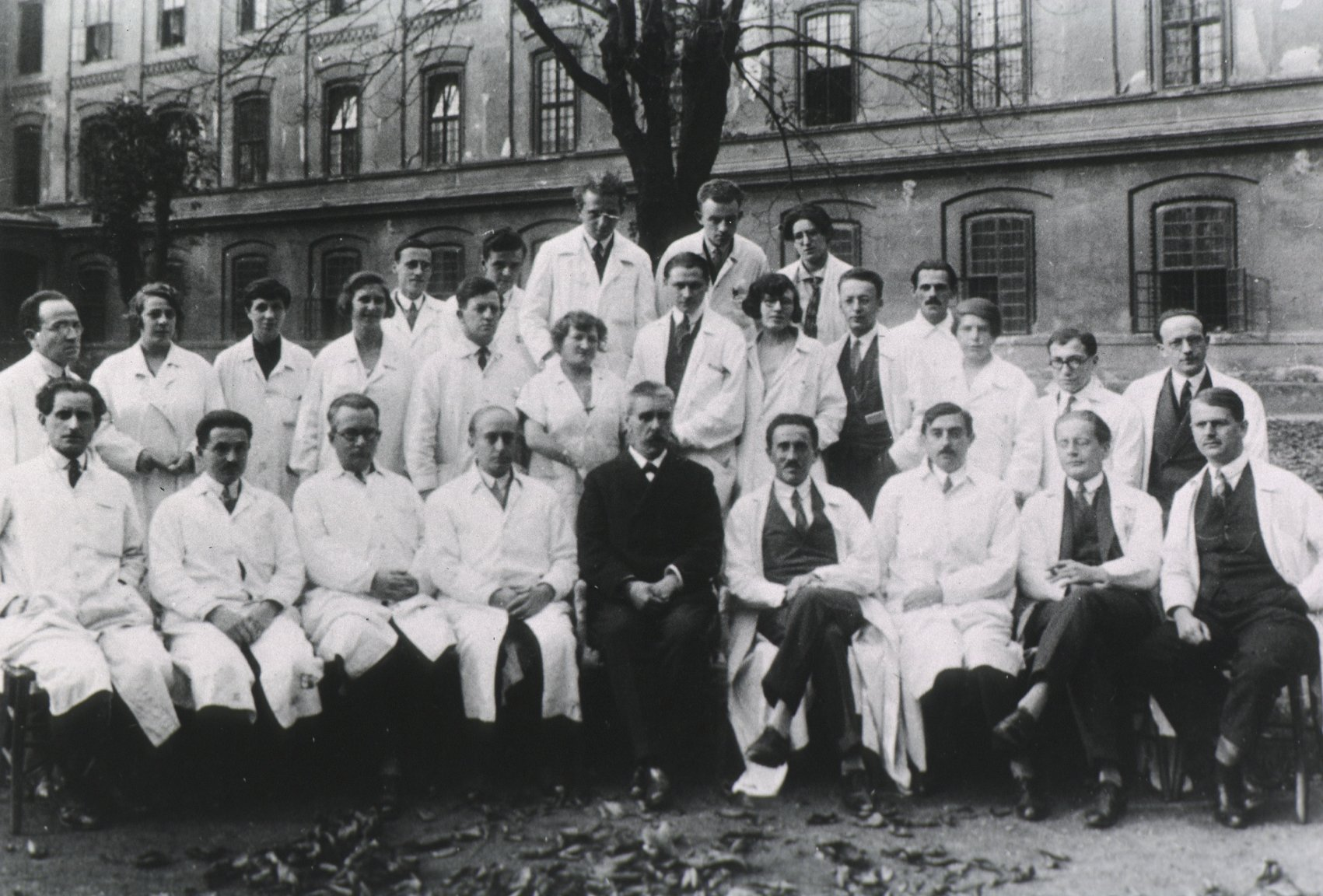
Wagner-Jauregg and coworkers in Vienna. Dr. Edith Klemperer (wearing tie) is in top row, far right.

== Fluorescent brain model ==
Escaping from Austria, Dr. Klemperer arrived in New York in September 1939 with the clothes on her back, $2 in cash, and her large glass-tube model of the human brain. Her "Luminous Brain," which she invented in 1931 and patented in 1934, was designed to demonstrate the brain's electrical impulses to medical students and science-oriented members of the public. Popular Science magazine described her invention as the product of years of research, "entirely made of glass, hundreds of tubes being manipulated into the form of the brain's parts."

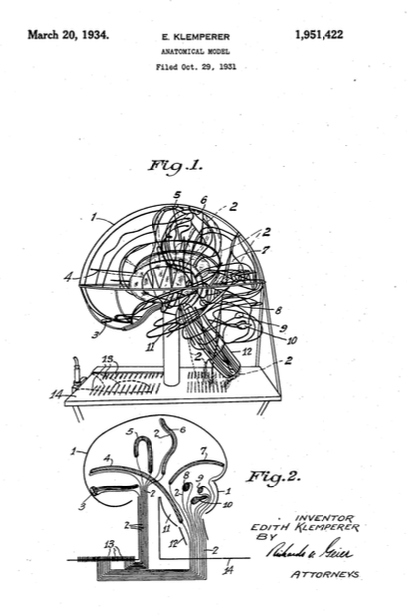
Patent for the Luminous Brain Model, 1934

Controlled by an electric switchboard, the model brain could demonstrate flashes of thought, automatic movements like breathing, and the disordered neural impulses associated with various mental illnesses. Newspapers from the U.S. to Australia reported on the model, with its glass tubes illuminating eleven different parts of the brain in "blue, green, crimson, purple, pink and yellow lights, an orgy of sparkling colour."

Klemperer's Luminous Brain was part of a trend in sophisticated 3D anatomical models, designed to be both visually dazzling and educational. In 1933, “Transparent Man,” a three-dimensional anatomical model of the human body, drew hundreds of thousands of visitors when exhibited at the Chicago World's Fair (see Century of Progress). Made by the German Hygiene Museum in Dresden, Germany, the Transparent Man model was commissioned by the Mayo Clinic.

Today, neuroscientists continue to create 3D models of the brain, using light to show its electrical activity. One example, "Glassbrain Flythrough 2015," which uses data from MRIs and EEGs, was created by the Neuroscape Lab at the University of California, San Francisco.

== Research and hypnotherapy ==
During her years as a researcher in Vienna, Dr. Klemperer published 24 papers, nine of them coauthored with Dr. Max Weissmann, on such topics as: chemical analyses of blood and cerebrospinal fluid in psychiatric and brain disorders; Korsakoff syndrome following insulin treatment of diabetics; and the body's response to hypnosis. Her research on the use of insulin to manage delirium tremens in 1926 is mentioned in the 2007 book Shock Therapy: A History of Electroconvulsive Treatment in Mental Illness, by Edward Shorter.

In New York during the 1940s, Dr. Klemperer was a senior psychiatrist with Bellevue Hospital. She then went on to pioneer the use of hypnosis, hypnotherapy and hypnoanalysis. As early as 1953, she used hypnosis to help people quit smoking tobacco.

In the 1950s and 1960s, she published several papers in the International Journal of Clinical and Experimental Hypnosis on such topics as hypnosis technique, primary-object relationships under hypnosis, and the ability of hypnotherapy to alter body image. She also lectured at the Society for Clinical and Experimental Hypnosis.

In 1968, she published her book Past Ego States Emerging in Hypnoanalysis.
