= Józef Brodowski the Elder =

Polish painter

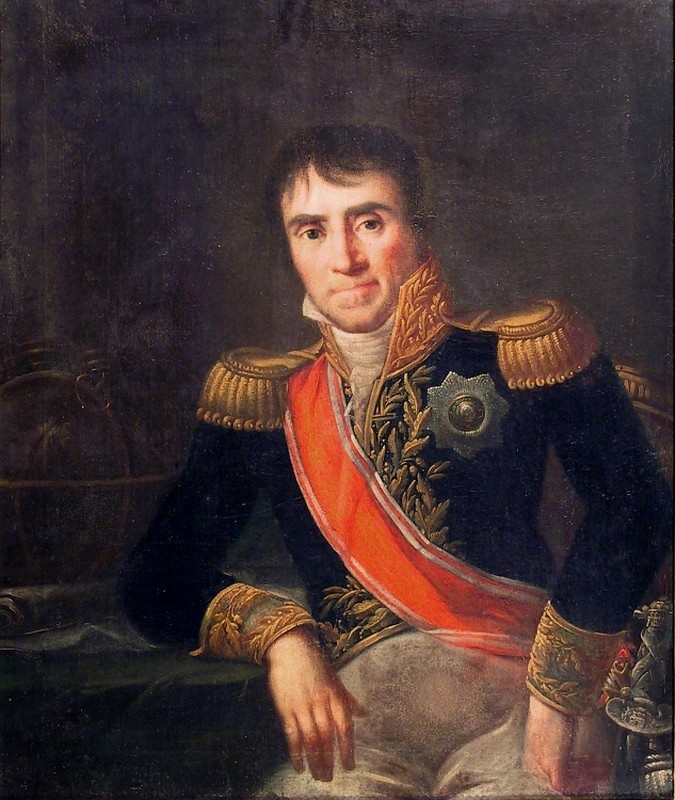
Portrait of Stanisław Wodzicki, politician and poet, 1817

Józef Brodowski, (c.1775/81 – 1853) was a Polish painter in the Classical style. He is called The Elder to distinguish him from Józef Brodowski (1828–1900), who was apparently not related.

== Biography ==
He was born in Warsaw. Thanks to the financial support of Princess Izabela Czartoryska, he was able to study in Vienna with Josef Abel and Johann Baptist von Lampi. After 1805, he lived in Łańcut, where he painted portraits and theatrical scenery.

In 1811, he was appointed a drawing teacher. Seven years later, he became one of the first professors at the Kraków Academy of Fine Arts.

He painted historical scenes, genre works, church decorations and portraits. Several of his history paintings involve scenes from the life of Tadeusz Kościuszko. He is noted for portraying the 19th-century Kraków on numerous sketches and prints. He was also an active member of the Przesąd Zwyciężony Masonic Lodge. He died in Kraków.

== See also ==
- List of Polish painters

== Sources ==
- Feliks Kopera; Polish Biographical Dictionary, Vol.2, Polish Academy of Learning, 1936. Reprint: Ossolineum, Kraków 1989, ISBN 83-04-03291-0
