= Symbols of Kraków =

Official emblems of Kraków, Poland

The city of Kraków uses a coat of arms, a seal, official colors, a flag, and a banner as its official symbols. Additionally, a number of semi-official and unofficial symbols of the city are also used.

Flag of Kraków, also during its time as a city-state

Banner of Kraków

Coat of Arms of Kraków

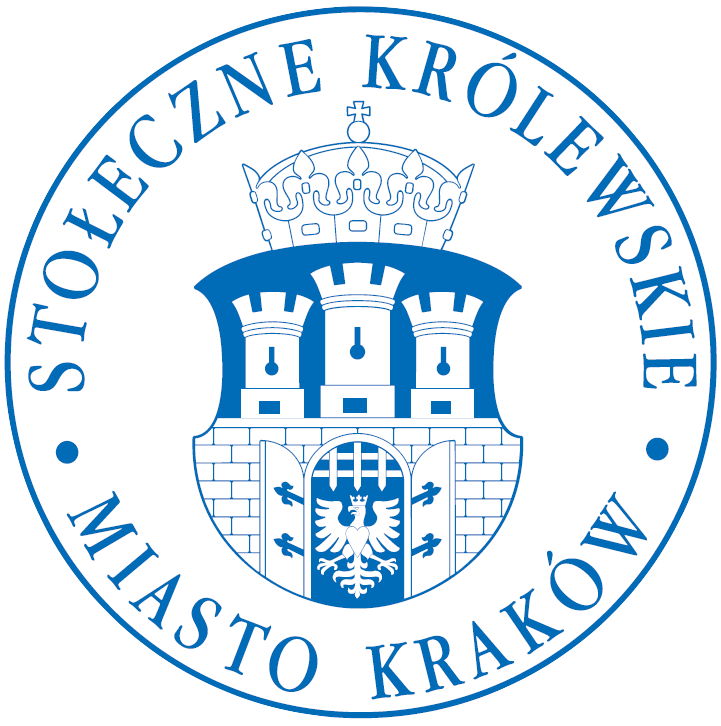
Seal of Kraków

== Official symbols ==
The current official symbols of Kraków are described by the Ordinance of the Kraków City Council no. CXXIII/1150/02 adopted on October 9, 2002. However, they are all based on symbols which have been in use since much earlier, some of them dating back to the 16th century.

=== Coat of arms ===
An 1833 medal with the coat of arms of Kraków

The coat of arms displays a red brick wall with three towers in a blue field. Each tower, the middle one taller and wider than the other two, is topped with a battlement with three crenels and has a black vertical loophole and a black window. In the wall there is a gate with a pair of open golden doors with fleur-de-lis-shaped metalwork and a raised golden grate. Inside the gate there is the White Eagle with a golden crown, beak and talons. The escutcheon has a typically Renaissance shape and is topped with a golden Crown of Bolesław I the Brave with fleurs-de-lis, closed with a globus cruciger (an orb with a cross).

The crowned White Eagle, which is also used in the coat of arms of Poland, and the crown above the escutcheon symbolize the fact that Kraków was the Polish capital and seat of Polish kings from ca. 1040 until 1596. The coat of arms with the brick wall, the three towers, the open gate and the eagle dates back to the 16th century. The actual colors and shapes, however, changed with time. The current design, adopted in 2002, uses shapes of the escutcheon and the eagle based on those found on Renaissance seals, signets and other artifacts, but other shapes, including Gothic and Neo-Classical, were also used in past. The Free City of Kraków, a city state which existed between 1815 and 1846 used the Kraków coat of arms as its state symbol. The Grand Duchy of Kraków created after the Free City's annexation by the Austrian Empire, used the White Eagle with the Kraków coat as an inescutcheon but without the eagle inside the gate.

=== Seal ===
The seal is round and consists of the coat of arms surrounded by an inscription with the city's official name: Stołeczne Królewskie Miasto Kraków, or "Royal Capital City of Kraków".

=== Colours and flag ===
The official colors of Kraków are white and blue. The flag consists of two horizontal stripes of equal width, the top one white and the bottom one blue. The flag proportions are 5:8. The white-and-blue bicolor was adopted as the flag of the Free City of Kraków in 1815. It is almost identical with the civil flag of San Marino, the only difference being the shade of blue.

=== Banner ===
The banner consists of a white saltire in a blue field with the coat of arms superimposed in the center. The banner proportions are 5:8. It is attached to a pole topped with a miniature of the crown used for coronations of Polish kings.

=== Use of official symbols ===
The use of the city's official symbols is regulated by the Ordinance no. 167/2004 signed by the Mayor of Kraków on February 6, 2004.

Both the banner and the seal exist in only two official specimens. One set of the banner and seal is used by the Mayor (Prezydent Miasta Krakowa) and the other – by the President of the City Council (Przewodniczący Rady Miasta Krakowa). The banner is only used on special occasions. Similarly, the seal is only impressed upon particularly important documents.

The coat of arms should be displayed outside and may be also displayed indoors by organs of the City of Kraków, the city administration and the city's one-person joint-stock companies. The flag is the most "democratic" of the official symbols as it may be used virtually by anyone, especially on special occasions.

	Pantone	CMYK	HEX	RGB
Blue	PANTONE Coated 2945 C	CMYK 100/55/0/0	004c97	RGB 0/100/167
Red	PANTONE Coated 185 C	CMYK 0/100/90/0	E4002B	RGB 228/5/33
Yellow	PANTONE Coated 116 C	CMYK 0/20/100/0	FFCD00	RGB 255/204/0

== Other symbols ==
Kraków logo

The crowned letter K of Kraków sanitation company

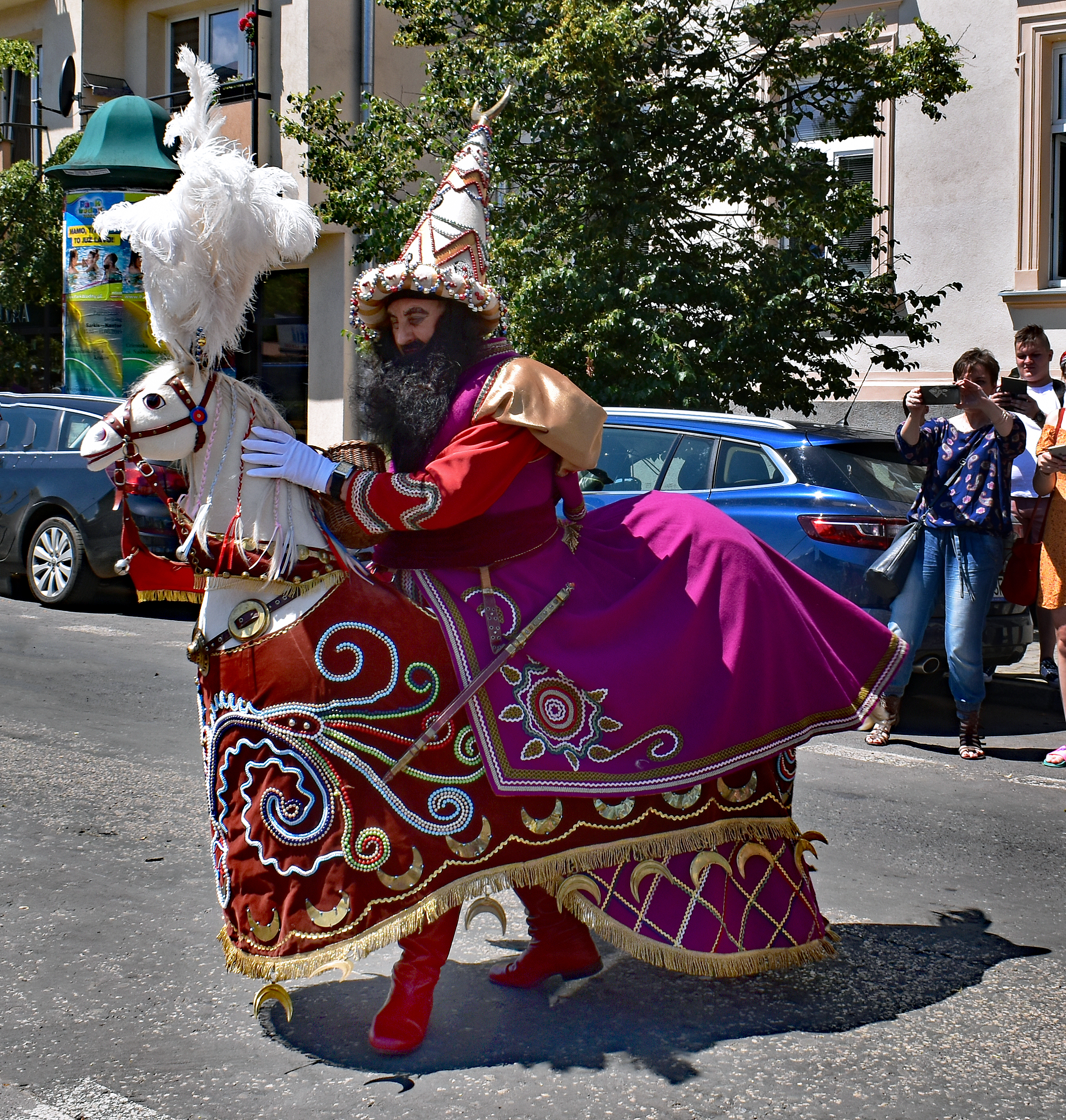
Lajkonik

Since the use of most of Kraków's official symbols is legally restricted, many semiofficial and unofficial symbols are also used. The Kraków logo, which includes the city's Latin name, Cracovia, is used by the city authorities for Kraków's promotion. Another popular symbol of the city is a stylized crowned letter K based on that found on old city seals and, most famously, on the door to the Wawel Cathedral.

Images of the city's patron saints, Saint Stanislaus and Saint Florian, may be also used as its symbols, particularly in religious contexts. Hejnał mariacki, the famous trumpet call made every hour from the taller tower of St Mary's Church, may be considered an audible symbol of Kraków. Other unofficial symbols of Kraków include a variety of objects popularly associated with the city, such as:

- the Wawel Dragon;
- the Lajkonik;
- certain landmark buildings, especially the Wawel, St Mary's Church, the Sukiennice (Cloth Hall) and the Barbican;
- mascarons from the Sukiennice attic;
- the krakowiak folk costume;
- obwarzanek krakowski, a traditional ring-shaped bread.

== See also ==
- Polish heraldry
