= Sucher =

Sucher is a surname. Notable people with the surname include:

- Dorothy Sucher (1933–2010), American author and psychotherapist
- George Sucher (born 1969), American international rugby union player
- Kevin Sucher, American record producer, recording engineer, mixer, and artist
- Rosa Sucher (1849–1927), German operatic dramatic soprano
- Sandra Sucher, American economist
- Zack Sucher (born 1986), American golfer

== See also ==
- Sicher, another surname
