= Jan Lewicki =

Polish painter

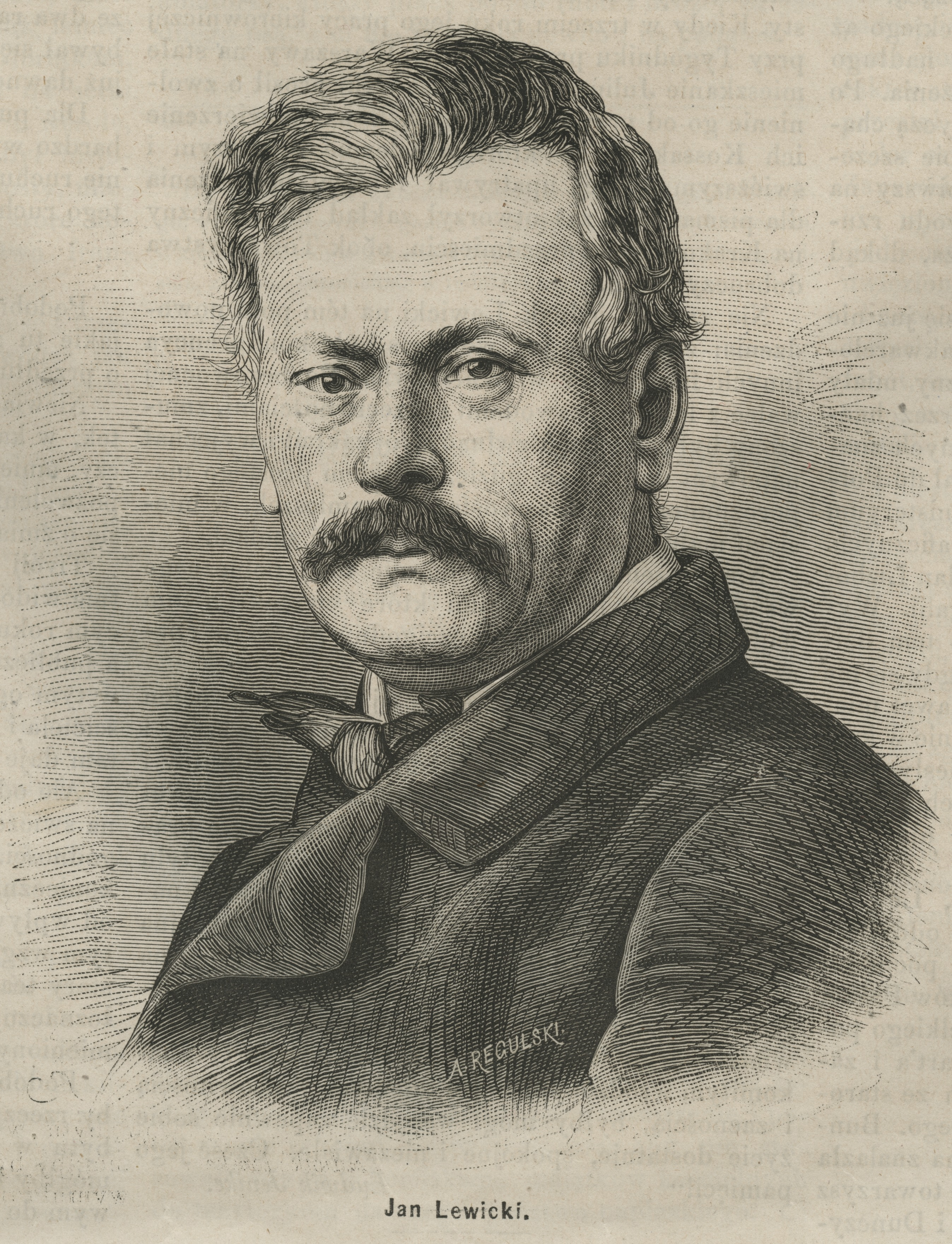
Jan Nepomucen Lewicki, 1871, by Aleksander Regulski

Jan Nepomucen Lewicki (1795 — 1871) was a Polish painter, participant of the Polish November Uprising (1830-1831).
