= Grand Duchy of Kraków =

Grand duchy of Austria (1846–1918)

Grand Duchy of Kraków Großherzogtum Krakau (German) Wielkie Księstwo Krakowskie (Polish)
- Grand Duchy of Austria (Austria-Hungary)
- 1846–1918
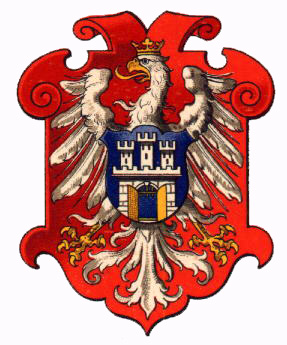
- Flag Coat of arms

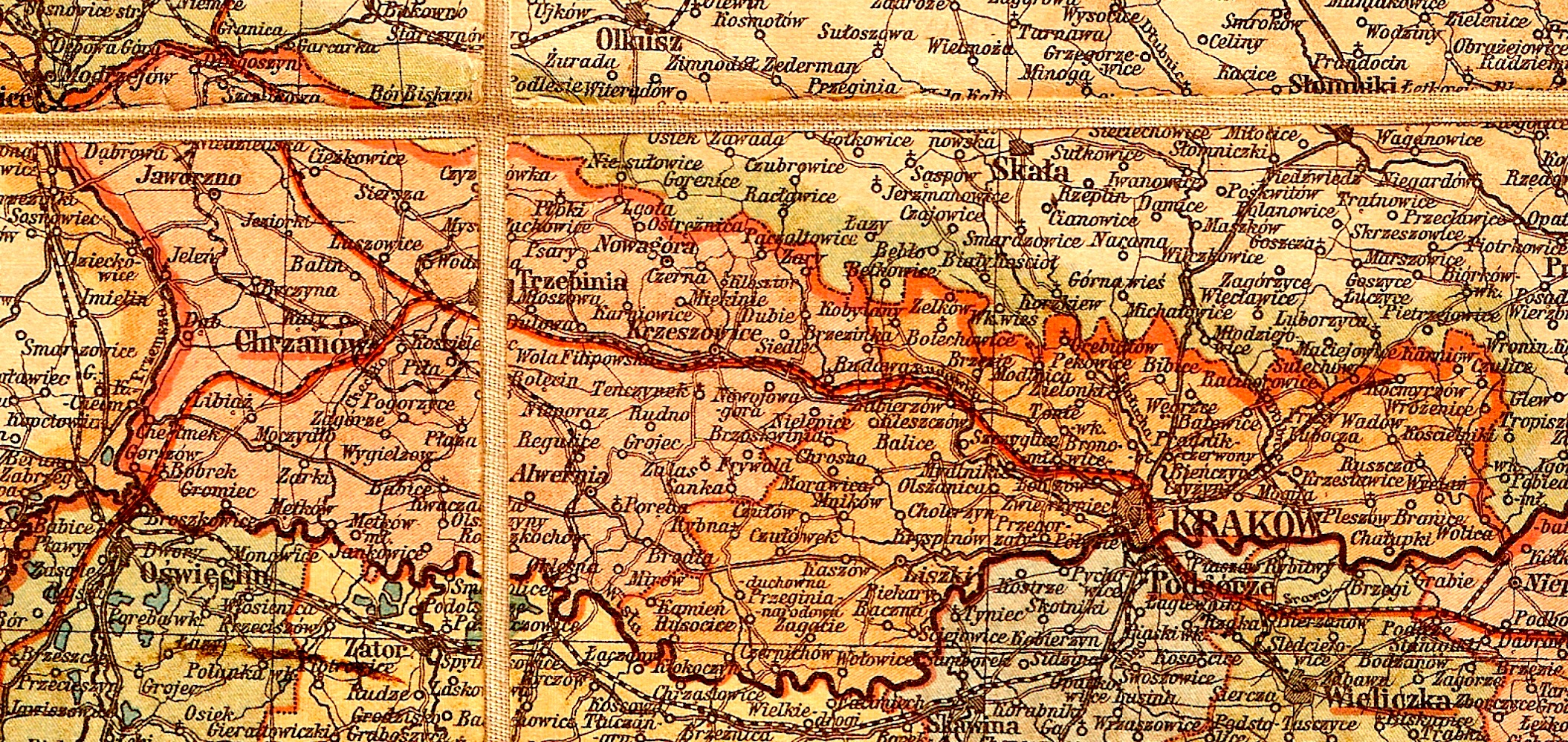
- Map of the Grand Duchy of Kraków
- Capital: Kraków
- Area
  - Coordinates: 50°4′N 19°56′E
- Government
- Grand Duke of Kraków^{1}
  - 1846–1848: Ferdinand I
  - 1848–1916: Franz Joseph I
  - 1916–1918: Karl I
- Historical era: Modern Age
  - Free City: 3 May 1815
  - Annexed: 16 November 1846
  - Ausgleich: 1867
  - Collapse of Austria-Hungary: 31 October 1918
  - Treaty of Saint-Germain: 10 September 1919
Preceded by	Succeeded by
Free City of Cracow	Second Polish Republic
- Today part of: Poland
- ^{1} Also the Emperor of Austria.

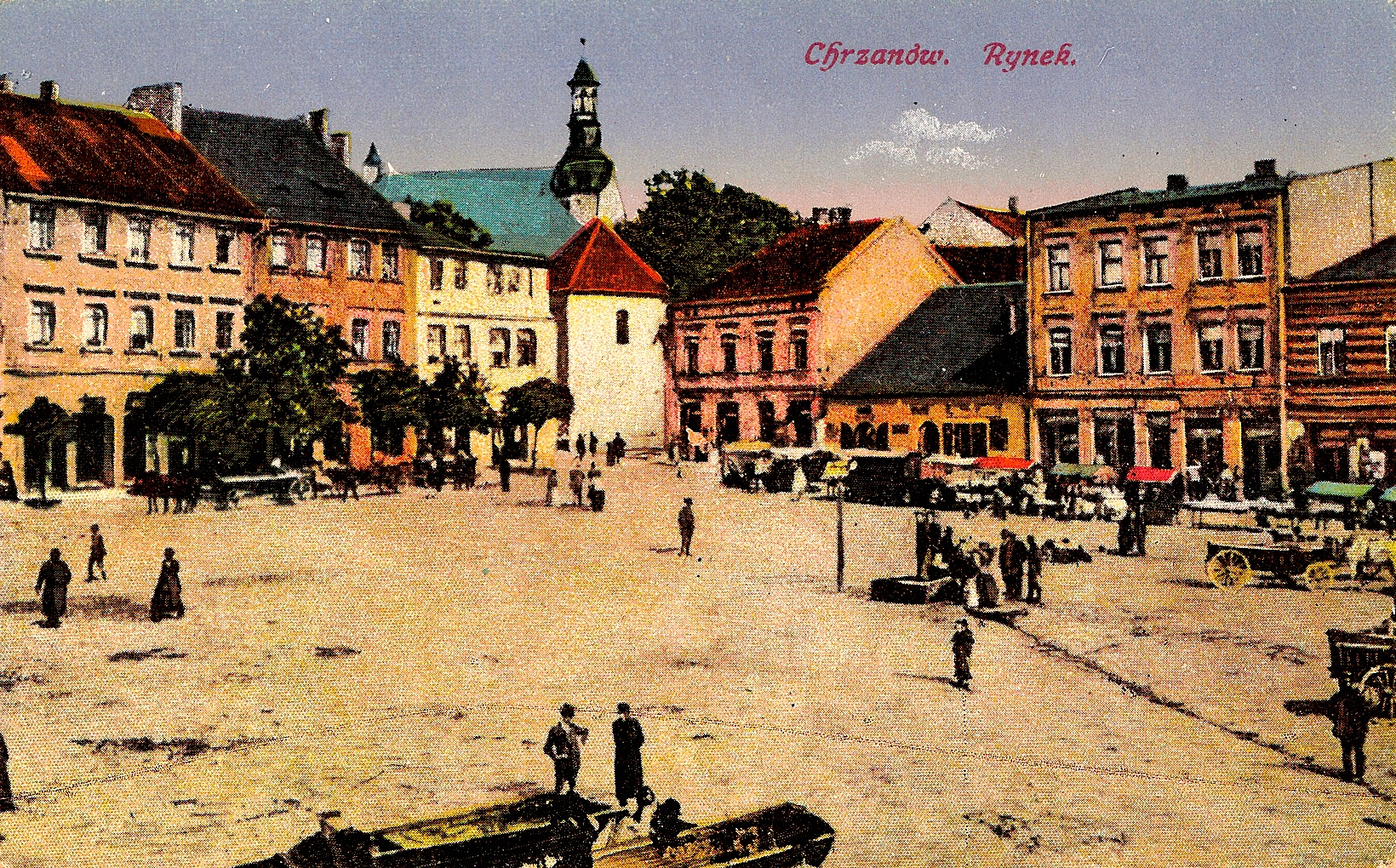
Market square in Chrzanów. A colored photograph from the period when the city belonged to the UK. Fr. Krakowski (ca. 1910)

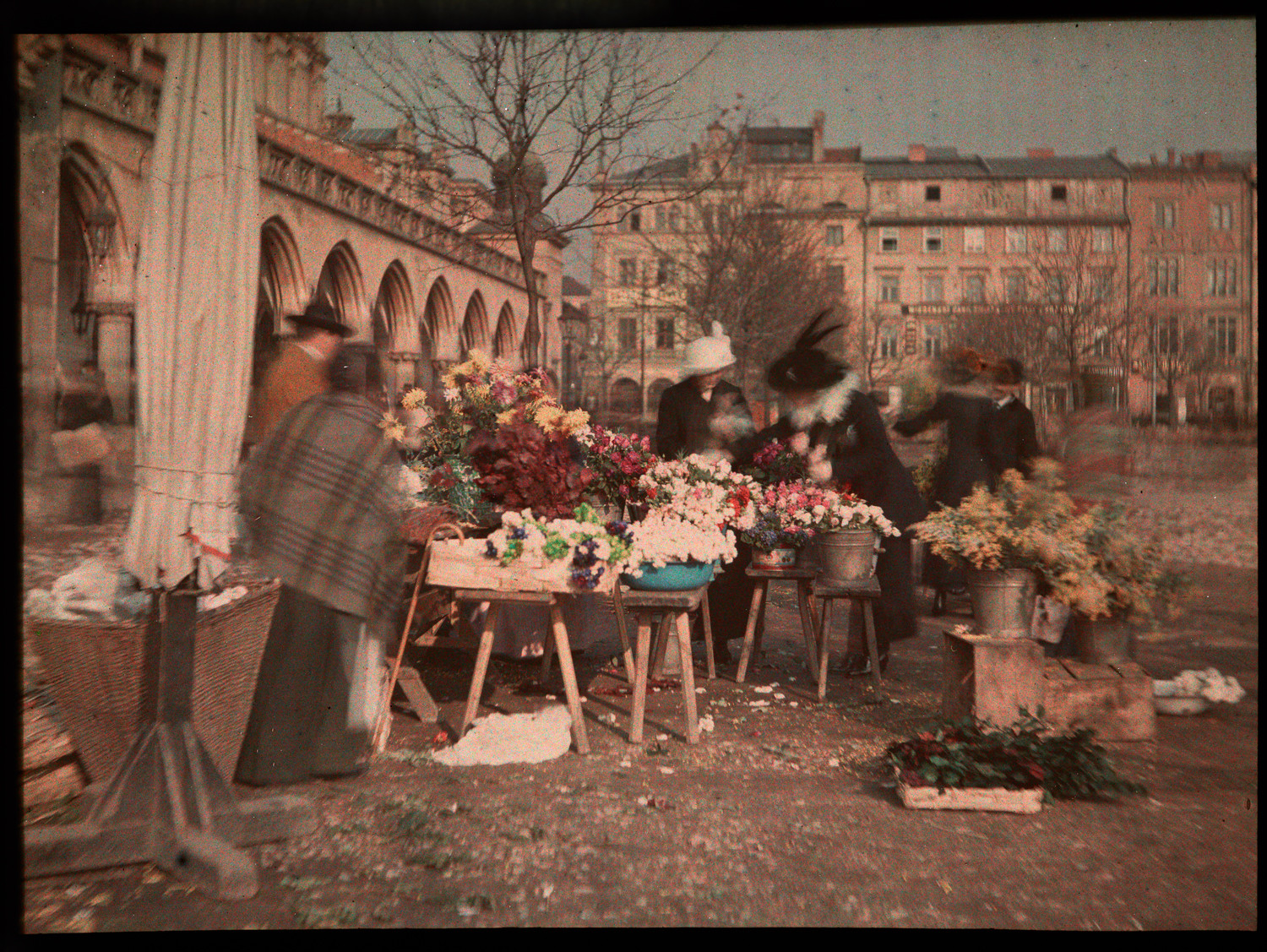
Krakow market square in 1912 in one of the first color photographs in the history of Poland

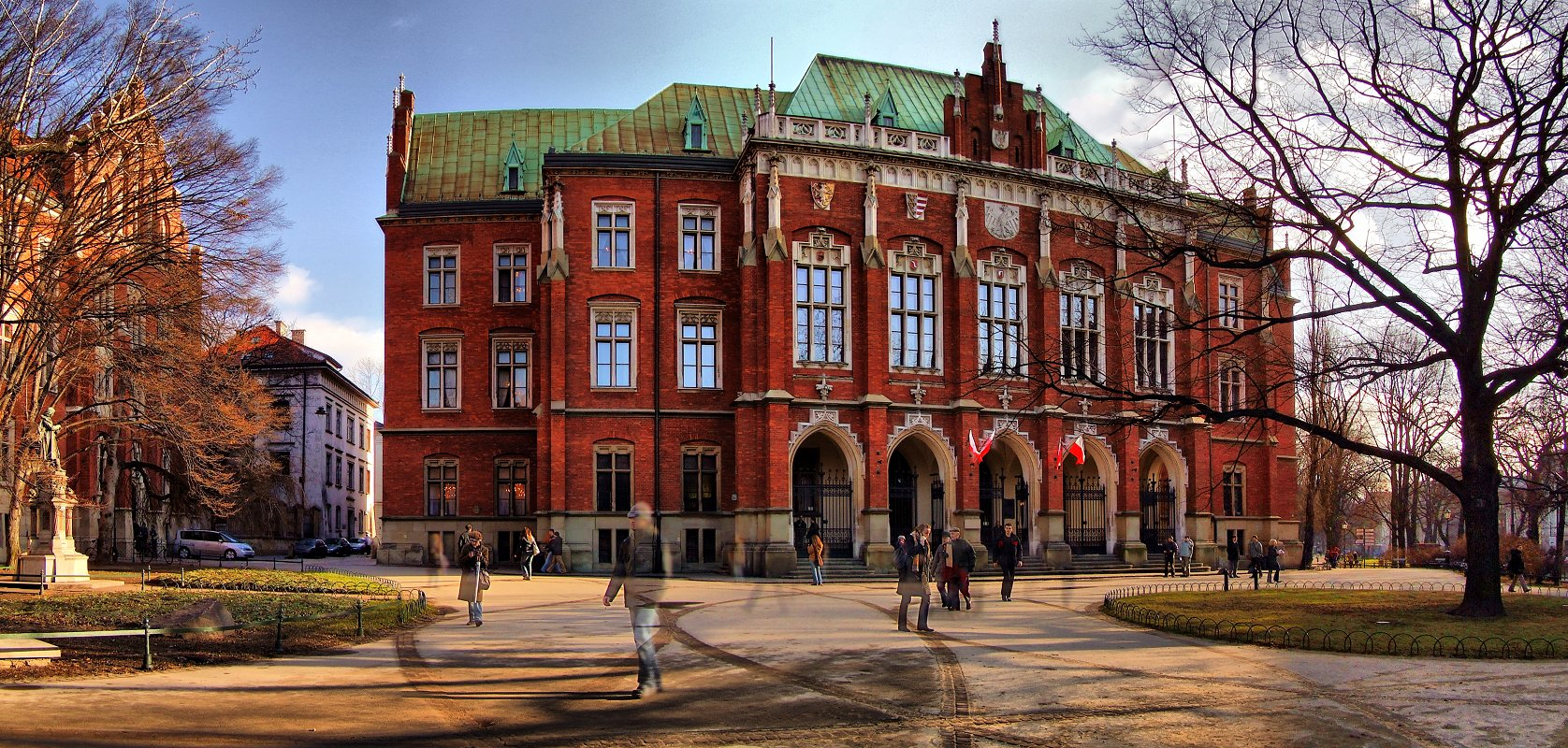
Collegium Novum in Krakow built after the re-Polonization of the Jagiellonian University during the times of the Grand Duchy of Krakow

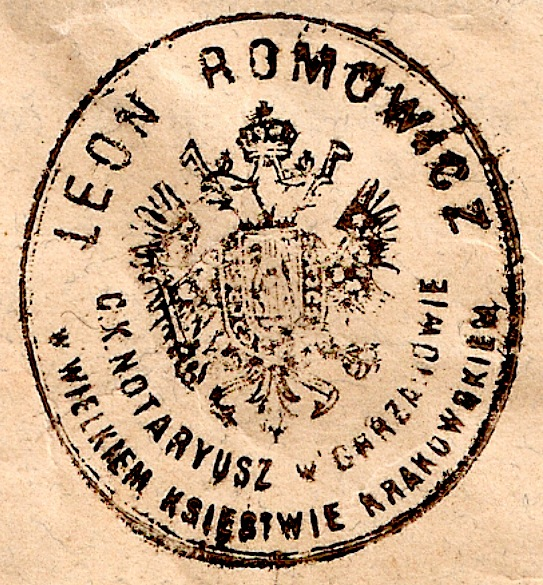
Seal of a notary from Chrzanów in W. Ks. Krakowskie

The Grand Duchy of Kraków (German: Großherzogtum Krakau; Polish: Wielkie Księstwo Krakowskie) was created after the incorporation of the Free City of Cracow into Austria on 16 November 1846. From 1846 to 1918 the title, Grand Duke of Kraków, was part of the official titulary of the Emperor of Austria.

== National symbols ==
The Grand Duchy of Kraków had its own coat of arms - a white eagle on a red background with the coat of arms of the city on the chest, but it was practically not used. It was similar to the flag of the Grand Duchy, consisting of three horizontal stripes: yellow, blue and white. In Juliusz Kossak's painting entitled The Emperor's Entry into Kraków and depicting the greeting of Emperor Franz Joseph by the inhabitants of Kraków, the flags with which the city was decorated are clearly visible: black and yellow flags of Austria, white and blue city flags of Kraków (former flag of the Free City of Kraków) and a red and white national flag. The flag of the Grand Duchy is not among them.

The separateness of these lands from the rest of Galicia was also visible in the titles of the Austrian emperor. As early as 9 August 1806, the Habsburgs adopted the title of "Grand Duke of Kraków" (Großherzog von Krakau) alongside "King of Galicia and Lodomeria". This title was held by four monarchs: Francis II, Ferdinand I, Franz Joseph I and Charles I. In the case of Francis II, however, it was a purely fictitious title referring to something that did not yet exist during his reign and was probably intended to legitimize the seizure of Polish lands by Austria in the Third Partition, the more so that the ruler also adopted other "empty" titles, such as: "Duke of Sandomierz", "Lublin", "Masovia", covering the territories incorporated into Austria during the Third Partition of Poland.

== History ==
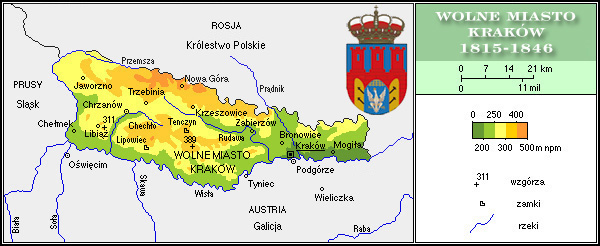
Plan of the Free City of Kraków, 1815–1846

The Free City, a remnant of the Duchy of Warsaw, had been made a protectorate, however functionally independent, as a result of the Congress of Vienna (1815). It was under Prussian, Austrian, and Russian trilateral influence until, in the aftermath of the unsuccessful Kraków Uprising, it was annexed by the Austrian Empire in 1846.

At the same time, the official name of the Austrian administrative entity containing approximately Galicia, and some Polish areas west of it, was changed to the Kingdom of Galicia and Lodomeria, and the Grand Duchy of Kraków with the Duchies of Auschwitz and Zator.

These entities (Kingdom of Galicia and Lodomeria, Kraków, Duchy of Auschwitz, and Duchy of Zator) were formally separate; they were listed each in the Austrian emperor's titles, each had its distinct coat of arms and flag. For administrative purposes, however, they formed a single province.

The Duchy had its own local government, the Governorate Commission (Polish: Komisja Gubernialna).

== Bibliography ==
- Alfred Regele: Die Einverleibung des Freistaates Krakau 1846. Ungedr. Diss., Wien 1951.
