= Rogów, Lesser Poland Voivodeship =

Rogów
- Village
- Location within Poland
- Coordinates: 50°27′16″N 20°3′25″E
- Country: Poland
- Voivodeship: Lesser Poland
- County: Miechów
- Gmina: Kozłów
- Population: 160

Rogów [ˈrɔɡuf] is a village in the administrative district of Gmina Kozłów, within Miechów County, Lesser Poland Voivodeship, in southern Poland.
