= Lydia Sicher =

American psychiatrist

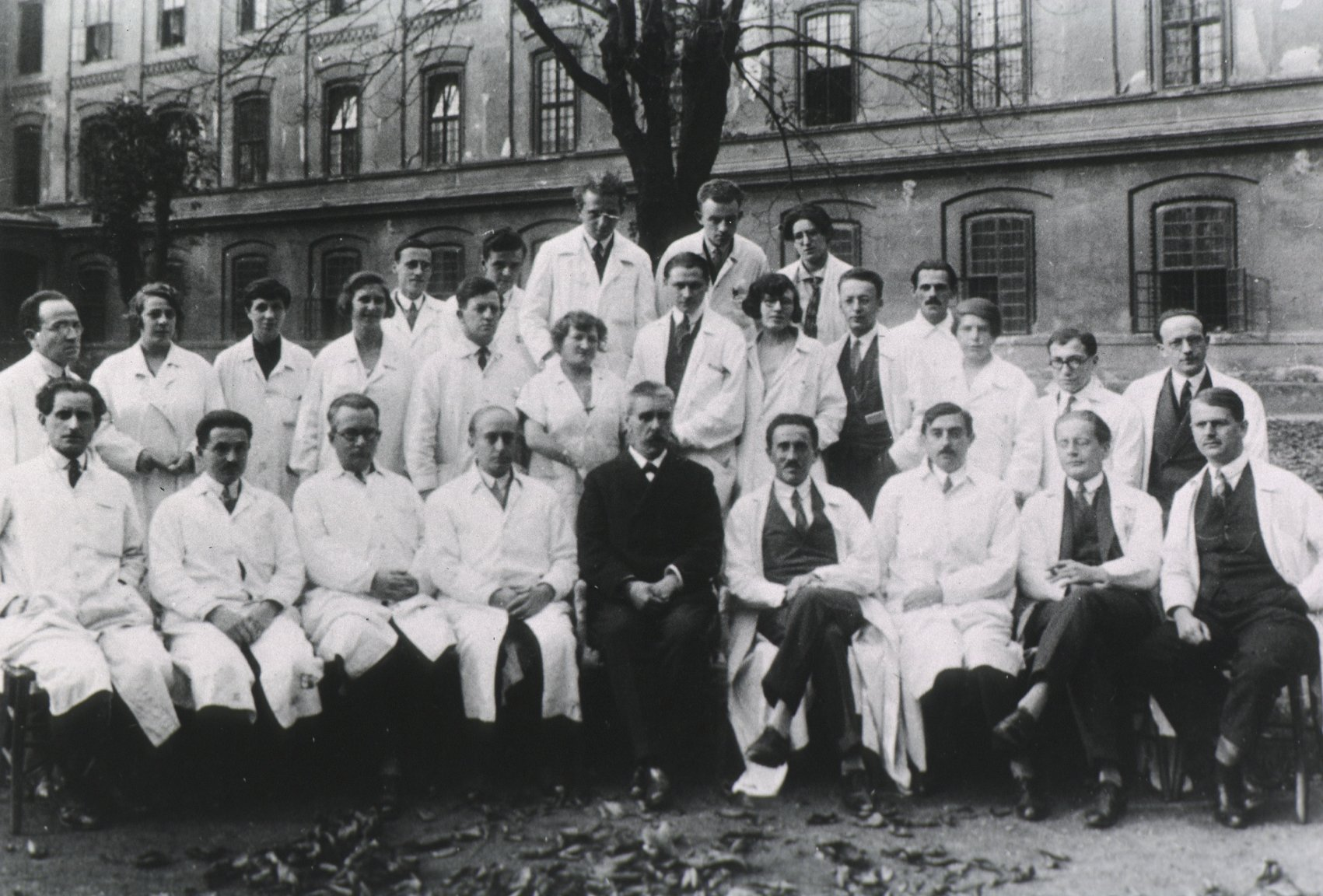
Sicher (2nd row, third from the left) with Wagner-Jaureggs' medical team in Vienna (1927)

Lydia Sicher (1890–1962), born Lydia Bak, was an Austrian-born medical doctor and psychologist. She founded the Institute for Individual Psychology.

== Life ==
Sicher married Harry Sicher in 1913, and they both then volunteered as doctors in World War I for the Austro-Hungarian Empire.

She later studied and worked with Alfred Adler, taking over him as director of the Clinic of Nervous Diseases at Maria Hilfer Hospital. George R. Bach, a co-worker of hers at the University of Southern California in the 1950s, spoke on her psychological techniques that "It was stressful therapy, But never unproductive, always real, genuine, and truth oriented." Her techniques were evocative of the Hegelian dialectic, wherein she used conflict with the patient as a means of arriving at truth.
