= Prime Minister of Poland =

Head of government

President of the Council of Ministers
- Prezes Rady Ministrów
- Logo used by institutions of the Polish Government

- State flag of Poland

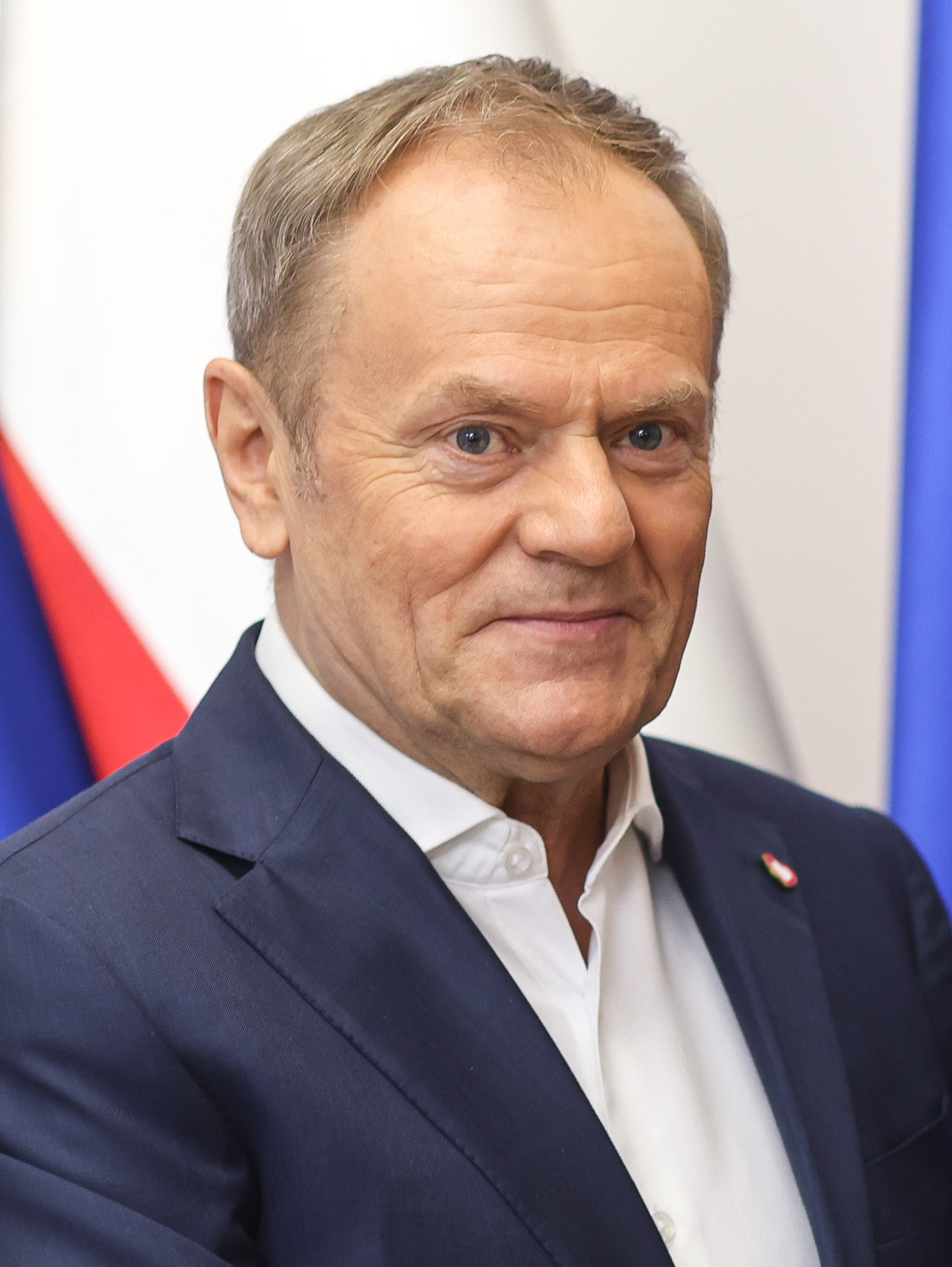
- Incumbent; Donald Tusk since 13 December 2023
- Council of Ministers; Chancellery of the Prime Minister
- Style: Your Excellency (formal), Prime Minister (informal)
- Type: Head of government
- Member of: European Council
- Residence: Hotel "Parkowa", Warsaw (official, rarely used)
- Seat: Building of the Chancellery of the Prime Minister
- Appointer: President or the Sejm with the confidence in the Sejm
- Precursor: Prime minister of the Kingdom of Poland
- Formation: 6 November 1918; 107 years ago
- First holder: Ignacy Daszyński
- Unofficial names: Prime minister
- Deputy: Deputy Prime Minister
- Salary: 389,516 Polish zloty/€81,772 annually
- Website: Official website

The prime minister of Poland (Polish: premier [ˈprɛmjɛr]), officially the president of the Council of Ministers (Prezes Rady Ministrów [ˈprɛzɛs ˈradɨ miˈɲistruf]), is the head of the cabinet and the head of government of Poland. The responsibilities and traditions of the office stem from the creation of the contemporary Polish state, and the office is defined in the Constitution of Poland. According to the Constitution, the president nominates and appoints the prime minister, who will then propose the composition of the Cabinet. Fourteen days following their appointment, the prime minister must submit a programme outlining the government's agenda to the Sejm, requiring a vote of confidence. Conflicts stemming from both interest and powers have arisen between the offices of President and Prime Minister in the past.

The incumbent and eighteenth prime minister is Donald Tusk of the Civic Platform party who replaced Mateusz Morawiecki following the 2023 Polish parliamentary election, after Morawiecki's third government failed to receive a vote of confidence on 11 December 2023, which Tusk's third government subsequently received on the same day and was sworn in two days later. Tusk was also the fourteenth prime minister, between 2007 and 2014.

== Origin of the office ==
=== Second Republic ===
Near the end of the First World War, an assortment of groups contested to proclaim an independent Polish state. In early November 1918, a socialist provisional government under Ignacy Daszyński declared independence, while a separate committee in Kraków claimed to rule West Galicia. In Warsaw, the German-Austrian appointed Regency Council agreed to transfer political responsibilities to Marshal Józef Piłsudski, recently released from Magdeburg fortress, as Chief of State of the new Polish nation. Piłsudski summoned Daszyński to the capital to form a government, where Piłsudski agreed to appoint Daszyński as the republic's first prime minister. Daszyński's premiership, however, remained brief, after the politician failed to form a workable coalition. Piłsudski turned instead to Jędrzej Moraczewski, who successfully crafted a workable government for the Second Republic's first months of existence.

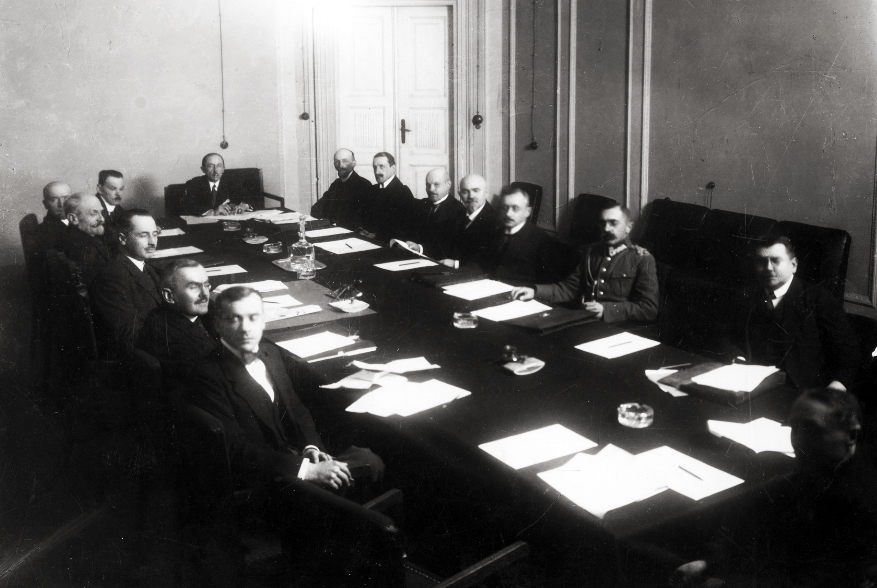
The cabinet of Prime Minister Leopold Skulski in a session in 1920. Due to the deep political divides of the early Second Republic, governments were short-lived, frequently falling within months.

The Small Constitution of 1919 outlined Poland's form of government, with a democratically elected Sejm, a prime minister and cabinet, and an executive branch. Despite outlining a parliamentary system, the Small Constitution vested many executive powers into Piłsudski's position as Chief of State. The executive branch could select and organise cabinets (with the Sejm's consent), be responsible to the ministries for their duties, and require the countersignature of ministers for all official acts. By the early 1920s, rightist nationalists within parliament, particularly Roman Dmowski and other members of the Popular National Union party and the Endecja movement, advocated reforms to the republic's structure to stem the authority of the chief of state (and ultimately Piłsudski) while increasing parliamentary powers. The result was the Sejm's passage of the March Constitution of 1921. Modeled after the French Third Republic, the March Constitution entrusted decision-making exclusively within the lower-house Sejm. The newly created presidency, on the other hand, became a symbolic office devoid of any major authority, stripped of veto and wartime powers.

Deriving authority from the powerful Sejm, the prime minister and the council of ministers, in theory, faced few constitutional barriers from the presidency to pass and proceed with legislation. In reality, however, the premiership remained extraordinarily insecure due to the harsh political climate of the early Second Republic, marked by constant fluctuating coalitions within parliament. Fourteen governments and eleven prime ministers rose and fell between 1918 and 1926, with nine governments alone serving during the five-year March Constitution era. Deeply frustrated with the republic's chaotic "sejmocracy" parliamentary structure, Piłsudski led rebellious Polish Army units to overthrow the government in the May Coup of 1926, effectively ending the Second Republic's brief experiment with parliamentary democracy, as well as the prime minister's free and popular elected mandate for the next sixty years.

Distrustful of parliamentary democracy, Piłsudski and his Sanation movement assumed a semi-authoritarian power behind the throne presence over the premiership and presidency. Piłsudski's August Novelisation of the 1921 Constitution retained the prime minister's post and the parliamentary system, though modified the president's powers to rule by decree, dismiss the Sejm, and decide budgetary matters. By the mid-1930s, Piłsudski and fellow Sanationists further stripped parliament and the premier's powers by enacting a new constitution, effectively establishing a strong "hyper-presidency" by 1935. The new constitution allowed for the president to dismiss parliament, the right to freely appoint and dismiss the prime minister, members of the cabinet and the judiciary at will, and promulgated the presidency as the supreme power of the state. Until the outbreak of the Second World War and the resulting exiling of the Polish government, the Sanation movement remained at the helm of a government dominated by the presidency with a weak, subordinate prime minister.

=== People's Republic ===
Under the communist Polish People's Republic, the ruling Polish United Workers' Party (PZPR) dominated all sections of the government, as recognised under the 1952 Constitution. Although the premiership continued to exist, the office's power and prestige relied more on the individual's stature within the governing communist party than the position's actual constitutional authority. The office acted as an administrative agent for policies carried out by the PZPR's Politburo, rather than relying on the support of the rubber stamp Sejm. In face of growing protests from the Solidarity movement for much of the 1980s, the PZPR entered into the Round Table Talks in early 1989 with leading members of the anti-communist opposition. The conclusion of the talks, along with the resulting April Novelisation of the constitution, provided various powers to the Sejm, along with reinstating both the previously dissolved upper-house Senate and the presidency as legal governmental entities.

=== Third Republic ===
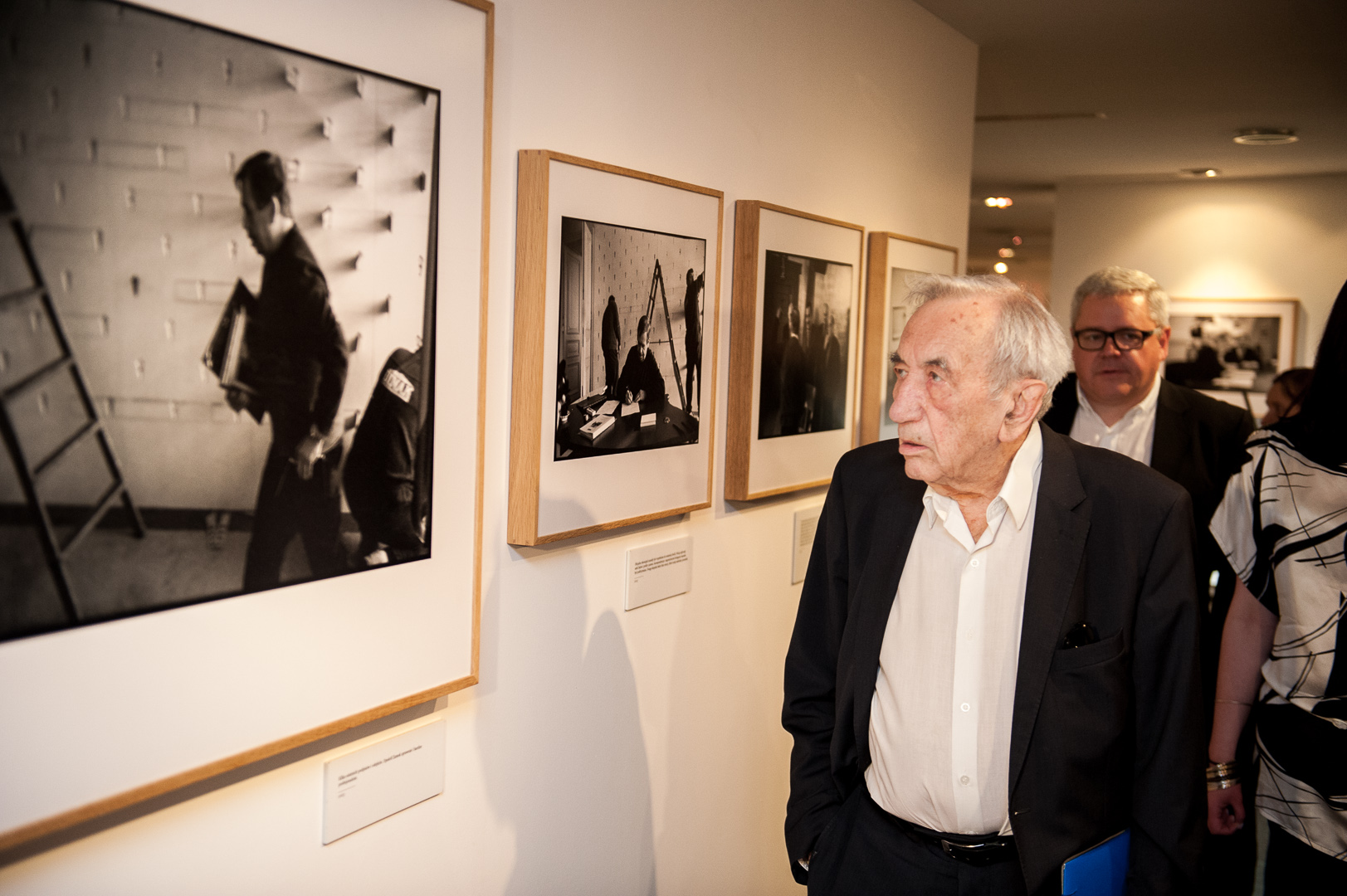
Tadeusz Mazowiecki, former prime minister of Poland browsing an exhibition at the Europeana 1989 roadshow in Warsaw.

Following the partially free 1989 parliamentary election, the Solidarity government of Tadeusz Mazowiecki faced the monumental task of formally institutionalising the office in order to define its relatively vague legal powers. As the communist state was quickly dismantled, this impasse remained due to the series of unstable governments falling in quick succession in the first years of the Third Republic. Matters were not helped by the vagueness of the presidency, whose recreation during the Round Table Talks left a poorly defined yet potentially powerful office. After Lech Wałęsa's direct 1990 election to the presidency, a tug of war between the offices of the premier and presidency regarding the powers of the two offices began, with Wałęsa arguing for increased presidential powers by drafting a new constitution, with the right to appoint and dismiss the prime minister and members of the cabinet. Although Wałęsa later recanted his attempts to create a presidential system, the president continued to advocate for a semi-presidential model similar to that of the French Fifth Republic. The passage of the Small Constitution in 1992, which dispensed with the communist 1952 version, clarified several presidential prerogatives over the prime minister, including the president's right to be consulted on the ministers of Defence, Foreign Affairs, and Interior. Although Wałęsa enjoyed a conflict free relationship with Prime Minister Hanna Suchocka, power rifts remained after the Small Constitution's passage, particularly with the Sejm, which Wałęsa repeatedly attempted to dissolve, influence its appointments, and shift its constitutional reform agenda towards the presidency's favour.

However, by the 1993 parliamentary election, which brought in a relatively stable left-of-centre coalition government between the Democratic Left Alliance (SLD) and the Polish People's Party (PSL), as well as Wałęsa's defeat in the 1995 presidential election by SdRP challenger Aleksander Kwaśniewski, an impetus for greater constitutional reform began to proceed. Between 1996 and 1997, a series of reform laws passed through parliament, strengthening and centralising the prime minister's prerogatives. These reforms would form the basis of the current 1997 Constitution. Significant changes included the ability for the prime minister to call a vote of confidence, the premier's exclusive right to allocate and reshuffle ministers, and also for the prime minister to solely determine the areas of competence for ministries. Many of the prime minister's new powers were gained at the expense of the presidency, which lost the rights to consult ministerial appointments, reject the prime minister's cabinet selection or reshuffles, chair the cabinet, and to veto the budget, although veto powers in other areas remained. Additionally, the previous communist-era Office of the Council of Ministers (Urząd Rady Ministrów) was reformed into the Chancellery in 1997 to act as the premier's executive central office and support staff, assisting the facilitation and coordination of policy among members of the cabinet. The reforms between 1996 and 1997, codified under the constitution, made the prime minister the centre of legal authority within the government.

== Selection and responsibilities ==
=== Appointment ===
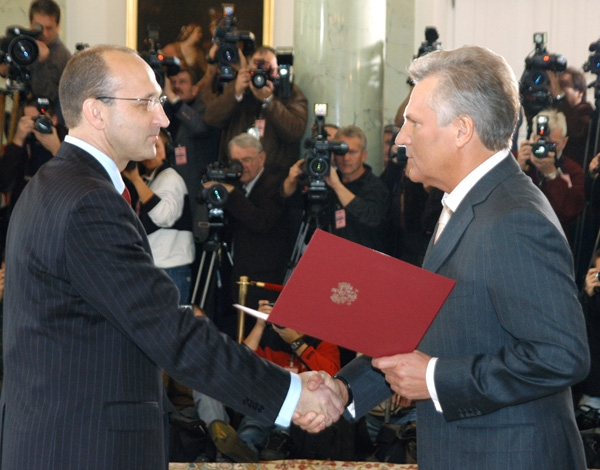
Prime Minister Kazimierz Marcinkiewicz (left) being sworn in by President Aleksander Kwaśniewski (right) in October 2005

According to Article 154 of the Constitution of Poland, the prime minister is nominated by the president. However, the nomination process is not solely dictated by presidential preference. By convention, the president nominates the leader of the party which obtained the most seats in the previous parliamentary election, or the leader of the senior partner in a coalition. The president is neither entitled to dismiss the prime minister, appoint nor dismiss individual members of the cabinet, or the council of ministers as a whole at will. Upon selection, the prime minister will propose members of the cabinet, and within fourteen days, must submit a programme outlining the new government's agenda to the Sejm, requiring a vote of confidence from its deputies. In the event that a vote of confidence fails, the process of government formation passes to the Sejm, which will then nominate a prime minister within fourteen days, who will again propose the composition of the cabinet. An absolute majority of votes in the presence of at least half of all Sejm deputies is required to approve the cabinet, and the president is required to accept and swear in the Sejm's nominee. If the vote of confidence fails again, the process of nomination is handed back to the presidency, who will appoint a prime minister, who will then nominate other members of the cabinet. If the vote of confidence fails a third time, the president is obliged to dissolve the Sejm and call new elections.

As part of political tradition, the prime minister and the ministers take the oath of office inside the Column Hall at the Presidential Palace, in a ceremony administered by the president. Upon their inauguration, the prime minister and the ministers must take the following pledge before the head of state:

"Assuming this office of prime minister [deputy prime minister, minister] I do solemnly swear to be faithful to the provisions of the constitution and other laws of the Republic of Poland, and that the good of the Homeland and the prosperity of its citizens shall forever remain my supreme obligation."

The oath may also be finished with the additional sentence, "So help me God."

=== Role in the cabinet and powers ===
Article 148 of the constitution stipulates that the prime minister shall act as the representative of the cabinet as a whole, delegate its agendas, coordinate the work of ministers, ensure the implementation of policy adopted by the cabinet, and issue regulations. Additionally, the prime minister acts as the superior of all civil servants. The prime minister is further assisted by a deputy prime minister (or ministers), who will act as a vice-president within the council of ministers. The make-up of the cabinet, its distributed portfolios and its governing style, however, very much depends on the premier's personality. The prime minister cannot, however, hold the presidency nor any other high state office, such as the chairmanships of the Supreme Chamber of Control, the National Bank of Poland, or the Ombudsman for Citizens Rights, simultaneously. With the power to distribute and reshuffle cabinet members, the prime minister can also discharge the functions of a minister. Similarly, the prime minister can call upon the cabinet to repeal a regulation or order from any minister.

The prime minister must answer questions from deputies during each sitting of the Sejm. The premier and other ministers are also constitutionally mandated to answer interpellations from deputies within 21 days of their submission.

In accordance to Poland's semi-presidential system, most official acts of the presidency require the prime minister's countersignature in order to become valid. Through this, the prime minister acts as a gatekeeper to the president to certain acts, while also accepting responsibility to the Sejm for the president's actions. This legal relationship, established under the constitution, attaches a significant presidential dependence on the prime minister's signature, arguably enlarging the premier's responsibilities and legal standing. The President, however, does not need the prime minister's countersignature for a limited selection of other acts, including the appointment of judges, conferring orders and decorations, appointing a president to the Supreme Court of Poland, exercising pardons, making a referral to the Constitutional Tribunal, or appointing members to the National Broadcasting Council. The presidency's most significant power over the prime minister is the right to veto the government's legislation, but this procedure may be overruled by a three-fifths voting majority in the Sejm.

The prime minister can also submit a vote of confidence of their cabinet to the Sejm. A vote of confidence in the cabinet can be granted by at least half of all of the Sejm's deputies. Similarly, if the council of ministers loses its majority support within the Sejm, the cabinet can be forced to resign in a constructive vote of no confidence. The motion must be approved by at least 46 deputies, and then passed by a majority vote. In such an event, a new prime minister must be simultaneously appointed. Additionally, the premier must submit the resignation of their cabinet at the first sitting of a newly elected parliament, as well as after a vote of no confidence has been successfully passed against the council of ministers or upon their own individual resignation. In the event of the prime minister's resignation or death, the president can either accept or refuse the cabinet's resignation of office.

For the regional governments of the voivodeships, the prime minister is empowered to appoint a voivode for each of the republic's sixteen provinces, who supervises the central government's administration in the regions, as well as the functions of local government. The Sejm, upon a motion of the prime minister, can dissolve a local or regional government if it is flagrantly violating the constitution or legal statutes.

Among the office's emergency and security powers, the prime minister can request to the president a military commander-in-chief of the Polish Armed Forces during a time of war, or order a partial or general mobilisation in the event of a direct threat to national security. The prime minister also retains the right to appoint and dismiss the heads of the special services, including the Policja, Border Guard, ABW, AW, and the State Protection Service. The heads of both the ABW and AW are entitled to directly report to the premier. (Note: The Policja, the Border Guard and the State Protection Service are directly subordinate to the minister of the interior.) In the event of public disorder, the prime minister can, upon a motion by the interior minister, authorise special armed units of the Policja to restore order. If such units prove ineffective in such a situation, the prime minister is authorised to call upon the president to deploy the Polish Armed Forces to bring law and order.

== Relationship with the presidency ==
Throughout the history of the Third Republic, the relationship between the prime minister and the president has ebbed and flowed. In the early to mid-1990s, the relationship largely depended on different interpretations of the vague, legal prerogatives of each office at the time, though since the passage of the Constitution of 1997, political preferences and individual personalities have characterised the relationship. Conflicts between the two offices, however, have generated party splits and political paralysis in the past.

Both before and after his 1990 election to the presidency, Lech Wałęsa had a deeply strained relationship with Prime Minister Tadeusz Mazowiecki, stemming from Wałęsa's belief that Mazowiecki was not aggressive enough in the dismissal of former Polish United Workers' Party members from senior government and economic positions. Mazowiecki's famous 1989 Thick Line speech (gruba kreska) further exacerbated the splintering. The split between the two men fractured the original uniting Solidarity Citizens' Committee by 1990, with intellectuals supporting Mazowiecki's new Citizens' Movement for Democratic Action, while workers supported the Centre Agreement, a political movement based around Wałęsa.

Similarly, Prime Minister Jan Olszewski also retained a notoriously strained relationship with Wałęsa during Olszewski's brief government between 1991 and 1992. Olszewski proceeded with a cautious approach to economic reform instead of implementing shock therapy, putting him at odds with the president. While Wałęsa advocated for constitutional reform to enlarge presidential prerogatives over the prime minister, Olszewski launched a campaign to deliberately embarrass the president and undermine Wałęsa's stature, releasing a list of alleged ex-communist collaborators within the Sejm, with some conspirators linked to the president. Wałęsa was further infuriated by Olszewski's attempts to gain influence within the Polish Armed Forces by appointing Radosław Sikorski as deputy defence minister without consultation. Wałęsa repeatedly called for the Olszewski government's dismissal, which the Sejm obliged, forcing the collapse of Olszewski's coalition in June 1992. Prime Minister Hanna Suchocka, who succeeded in forming a government after Waldemar Pawlak's failure to gather a workable coalition, enjoyed a far more amicable relationship with the president.

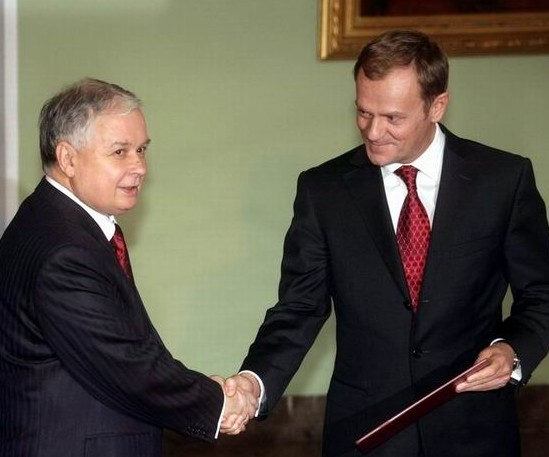
President Lech Kaczyński (left) and Prime Minister Donald Tusk (right), seen during Tusk's oath of office in November 2007. Frequent disputes between the two leaders characterised Polish politics between 2007 and 2010.

The implementation of a new constitution in 1997 profoundly affected the relationship between the premiership and the presidency. Uncertainties over presidential and prime ministerial power that marked the Third Republic's first years were removed, eliminating the ability of the president to fully disrupt the government, and further strengthening the prime minister's position. Under President Aleksander Kwaśniewski, Prime Minister Jerzy Buzek's government became the first administration to be elected under the new constitution. Despite being from opposite parties (Kwaśniewski's centre-left Social Democracy of the Republic of Poland and Buzek's centre-right Solidarity Electoral Action), the relationship between both offices was smooth, partly due to Kwaśniewski's non-confrontational personality. Kwaśniewski sparingly used his veto powers in legislation the president did not agree with, choosing to let the government's concordat with the Holy See, a new lustration act and new electoral statutes to proceed without hindrance, though Kwaśniewski vetoed Buzek's privatisation plan. Kwaśniewski's relationships with the like-minded social democratic premierships of Leszek Miller and Marek Belka were virtually free of conflict.

Relations between the two executive organs, however, returned to animosity under the presidency of Lech Kaczyński and Prime Minister Donald Tusk. Political rivals for years, fueled by the 2005 presidential poll which saw both men as the main challengers, Tusk's centre-right Civic Platform toppled Kaczyński's twin brother Jarosław's government in the 2007 parliamentary election. Tusk's support for stronger integration into the European Union, including the signing of the Lisbon Treaty, and a rapprochement with Russia, put Kaczyński directly at odds with the prime minister. From 2007 until Kaczyński's death in the Smolensk air disaster in 2010, policy differences between the two offices were a constant source of division, with the president employing his limited veto powers numerous times over the government's legislation; Tusk's government lacked a 60 percent threshold to overturn such vetoes. In response, Tusk made no secret his party's desire to replace Kaczyński in the 2010 presidential election. Although Tusk and Kaczyński found several areas of compromise, clashes between the Chancellery and the Presidential Palace became a regular feature in both the domestic and international political scenes for the next two and a half years. Frustrated by Kaczyński's veto, Tusk argued for a constitutional amendment in November 2009 to strip the presidency of its veto powers, declaring: "The president should not have veto power. People make their decision in elections and then state institutions should not be in conflict...Let us change some provisions so we can have fewer conflicts and more cooperation. We propose changes to the constitution so that the centre of power lies with the government... The presidential veto brings more harm than good.".

In 2015 in a short period of time relations between President Andrzej Duda and Prime Minister Ewa Kopacz were tense too. On 31 May 2015 Duda announced the resolution electing him president during the ceremony. He appealed for no major political changes to be made before his swearing-in, as well as no changes "that may arouse unnecessary emotions and create conflicts." The prime minister noted that the government's relations with the president are defined in the Constitution: "This is indeed a surprising appeal. Please remember that the constitution regulates even friendly relations between the head of state and the government. The government has its duties, but also obligations towards Poles." She assured that her government had already fulfilled 90 percent of its announcements made in the expose and would continue to implement its programme. "The government should work until the end. That's what Poles pay it for," said Kopacz. The dispute between the president and the prime minister continues. Neither during the ceremony at Westerplatte nor immediately after did the politicians decide to talk. Even though Duda and Kopacz were standing next to each other, they did not shake hands.".

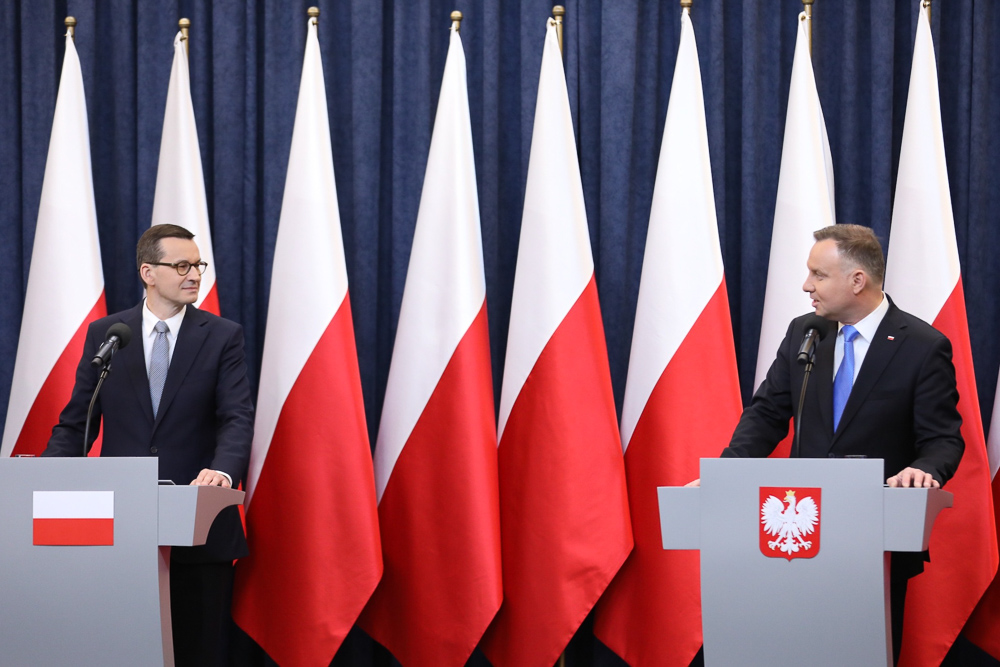
President Andrzej Duda (right) and Prime Minister Mateusz Morawiecki (left), seen during conference

Duda's relationships with the conservative prime ministers Beata Szydło and Mateusz Morawiecki were virtually free of conflict. Duda sparingly used his veto powers in legislation the president did not agree with. The most known were Lex TVN and Lex Czarnek.

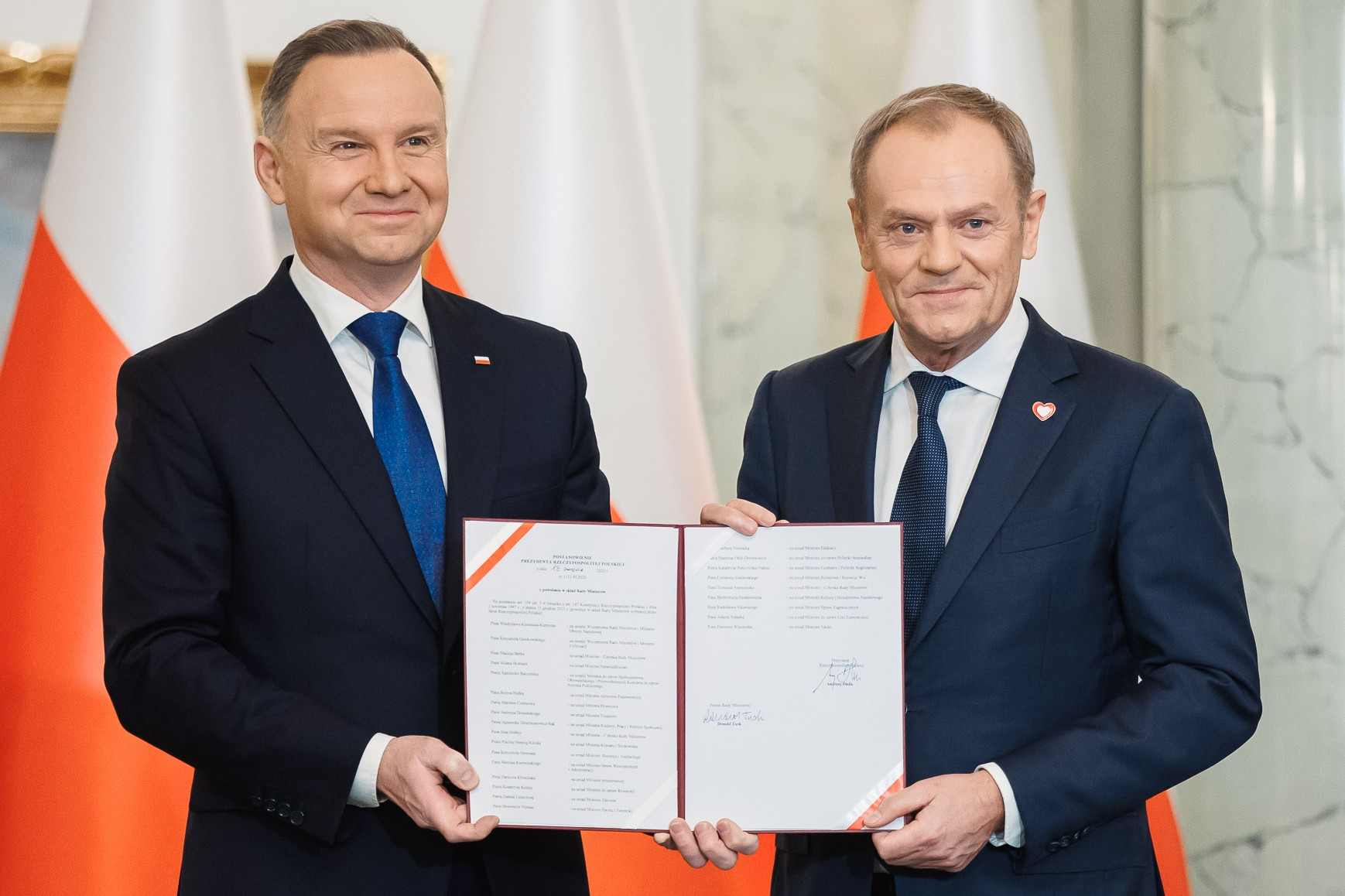
President Andrzej Duda (left) and Prime Minister Donald Tusk (right), seen during Tusk's oath of office in December 2023.

Relations between the two executive organs, however, returned to animosity under the presidency of Duda and Prime Minister Tusk. United Right would be unable to govern on its own, and Duda stated his intention to re-appoint incumbent Morawiecki as Prime Minister due to the existing albeit unofficial convention of nominating a member of the winning party. The four opposition parties criticised Duda's decision as a delay tactic. The opposition parties subsequently signed a coalition agreement on 10 November, de facto taking over control of the Sejm, and agreed to nominate former Prime Minister and European Council President Donald Tusk as their candidate. Morawiecki's new cabinet, dubbed the "two-week government" and "zombie government" by the media due to its anticipated short-livedness, was sworn in on 27 November 2023. Duda said he would veto the government’s amended 2024 spending bill and propose his own, in a challenge to Tusk. In a post on the social media platform X, Duda cited the bill’s funding of public media, and said blocking it was appropriate “in view of the flagrant violation of the constitution.” Tusk himself tweeted that “the president’s veto takes away money from teachers”, to which Duda responded that if “you convene [parliament] after Christmas and pass by bill, which will included raises for teachers”, then they would not lose out. On 31 January 2024, Duda signed the national budget, agreed by the government, but sent it swiftly to the constitutional court citing doubts over its adoption. Although the budget was passed with a large majority, the absence of the two MPS, whose parliamentary mandates were annulled over criminal convictions, meant the National Assembly was not at full capacity when the vote took place. Tusk warned on Tuesday of a snap election if the budget is blocked by Duda. After Duda signed the budget, Tusk said sending the signed bill to the Constitutional Tribunal wouldn't change anything. "The budget is approved and that was the goal. The rest doesn't matter. People will get the money, nothing will stop it now.". On 29 March 2024 Polish President vetoes bill restoring access to emergency contraception. In a statement, Duda’s office outlined that his motivation in rejecting the legislation was to “protect the health of children”. He is opposed to the fact that the law would have allowed anyone aged 15 and above (Poland’s age of sexual consent) to buy the morning-after pill without the involvement of a doctor. The bill to restore prescription-free access to the 'morning-after pill' came from Prime Minister Donald Tusk's government, Tusk wrote on platform X "The president did not take advantage of the opportunity to stand on the side of women. We are implementing plan B". In April 2024, the Polish Sejm took a significant step by approving a bill that recognizes Silesian as an official regional language in Poland. This recognition was accepted by the Senate, however on 29 May 2024 The President has vetoed the bill. The president’s decision, which had been widely expected, was criticised by figures from the ruling coalition, it would allow the inclusion of Silesian in school curricula and its use within local administration in municipalities. Tusk responded on platform X "I would tell you in Silesian, Mr. President, what I think about your veto, but it is not appropriate in public". On 16 August 2024 Duda vetoed a bill that would have disbanded a commission investigating Russian influence on Poland’s internal security from 2007 to 2022. On 11 March 2025 President Andrzej Duda has vetoed a bill passed by the Polish government’s majority in parliament that would have changed the way the results of this year’s presidential election are validated by the Supreme Court. On 17 April 2025 President sent a bill that would expand Poland’s hate crime laws to include sexual orientation, sex/gender, age and disability as protected categories to the Constitutional Tribunal (TK). On May 6, 2025, President Duda vetoed a bill that would have reduced health insurance contributions for around 2.5 million business owners, citing risks to NFZ funding, lack of social consensus, and threats to social justice. Meanwhile, Prime Minister Tusk commented: “PiS increased the health insurance contribution for business owners. I proposed lowering it. President Duda vetoed the reduction. They are doing harm because they still can. There are 91 days, 9 hours and 2 minutes left of Duda’s presidency.”. On his last day in office August 5, 2025, President Andrzej Duda blocked two government initiatives and questioned a third. He refused to sign legislation that would have shut down certain academic institutions created under the previous PiS (Law and Justice) administration, and he also rejected proposed changes to a justice-sector training body. In addition, he referred a separate law to the Constitutional Tribunal, arguing it raised constitutional concerns because this legislation would have allowed individuals aged 13 and up to access psychological healthcare without requiring parental consent. He cited concerns that it would undermine parents’ constitutional rights.

The 2025 presidential elections in Poland were a pivotal moment, occurring amid escalating tensions between the presidency and the government. After Andrzej Duda’s second term ended on August 6, 2025, Karol Nawrocki, former head of the Institute of National Remembrance and a conservative-nationalist figure, was elected president, defeating the government-backed candidate, Rafał Trzaskowski. Nawrocki’s victory deepened political divisions and further strained relations with Donald Tusk’s pro-European government. Soon after taking office, Nawrocki used his presidential powers to block key government proposals. On August 21, 2025, Polish President Karol Nawrocki used his veto for the first time since assuming office earlier that month, rejecting a bill that sought to relax rules on building onshore wind turbines and prolong the freeze on household electricity prices through the end of 2025. The veto drew sharp criticism from the ruling coalition, economists, and climate activists. Prime Minister Donald Tusk accused Nawrocki of bad faith or mismanagement, warning that the decision could push electricity prices higher for all Polish households, both immediately and in the long term... On August 25, 2025, Polish President rejected a bill that sought to prolong state financial support for Ukrainian refugees in Poland. His office explained that he opposes what it described as the “preferential treatment of foreign nationals” and plans to introduce his own legislative proposals on the issue. The bill that was vetoed sought to extend aid for around one million Ukrainian refugees in Poland, many of whom fled the ongoing war. It also included funding for Ukraine’s Starlink internet access. Nawrocki also vetoed two bills included in the government’s economic “deregulation” package, which would have, among other changes, reduced penalties for tax offenses that do not directly cause financial losses. Despite presidential opposition, Tusk’s government continued pursuing its agenda, including renewable energy development and support for Ukraine, such as maintaining Starlink internet access, even after corresponding laws were vetoed.

On 27 August 2025 President Nawrocki has vetoed two additional bills, one concerning reforms to Poland’s oil and gas reserves law and the other amending legislation on plant protection measures.

On 29 August 2025 President vetoed a government amendment to Poland’s child-protection law – commonly referred to as “Lex Kamilek,” which was introduced after the tragic death of an eight-year-old named Kamil (alias "Kamilek") by his stepfather. The proposed changes would have removed the requirement for double criminal record checks, allowing—for instance—a school to skip re-verifying a coach already screened by a sports club, and exempting professionals like police officers, lawyers, judges, as well as volunteers, parents helping in school activities, and visitors, from obtaining criminal-clearance certificates.

On 17 October 2025, the President of Poland, vetoed a bill that would have recognised the Wymysorys language (also known as Vilamovian) as an official regional language of Poland. Wymysorys is a critically endangered West Germanic language spoken in the town of Wilamowice in southern Poland. It is estimated that fewer than 100 people speak the language, with most fluent speakers being elderly. The language originated in the 13th century and has been strongly influenced by Polish.

On 8 November 2025, Nawrocki vetoed legislation that would have created the Lower Oder Valley National Park, which would have been Poland’s first new national park in 24 years. The bill had previously been approved by parliament as part of the government’s plans to expand protected natural areas.

On 28 November 2025, Nawrocki vetoed a bill that would have introduced universal access to postal voting in Polish elections. The legislation, approved earlier by parliament, would have allowed any voter in Poland or abroad to submit their ballot by mail if they registered in advance.

On 1 December 2025, vetoed legislation intended to regulate the crypto-assets market in Poland and align national law with the European Union’s Markets in Crypto-Assets Regulation (MiCA) framework. The bill had previously been approved by parliament with support from the governing coalition. The legislation would have introduced oversight of the crypto-asset sector by designating the Polish Financial Supervision Authority (KNF) as the regulator. Crypto-asset companies would have been required to submit information about their activities to the authority, which would have had the power to impose sanctions and enforce compliance. The bill also included provisions establishing criminal liability for certain offences related to crypto-asset activities.

On 2 December 2025, Nawrocki vetoed a bill that would have banned keeping dogs on chains and introduced minimum kennel-size requirements based on the weight of the animal. The proposal had previously been approved by parliament.

On 19 December 2025, Nawrocki, vetoed two government bills that would have increased taxes on alcoholic beverages and sugary or sweetened drinks. The legislation had been passed by parliament as part of the government’s efforts to increase state revenue and influence consumer behaviour.

In January 2026, Nawrocki vetoed legislation intended to implement the European Union’s Digital Services Act (DSA) in Polish law. The bill, which had been approved by parliament, aimed to establish national mechanisms for enforcing the EU regulation and addressing illegal online content. The proposed law would have granted authorities such as the Office of Electronic Communications and the National Broadcasting Council powers to block online content considered illegal, including material containing criminal threats, child abuse, incitement to suicide, hate speech, or violations of intellectual property rights. Requests to block content could have been submitted by individuals as well as public bodies such as the police, prosecutors, border guard, or tax authorities.

In February 2026, Nawrocki vetoed legislation that would have recognised the Silesian language as an official regional language in Poland. Silesian is spoken in the historical region of Silesia in southwestern Poland. According to the 2021 national census, around 460,000 people declared that they use Silesian as their primary language at home.

== Support staff and residence ==
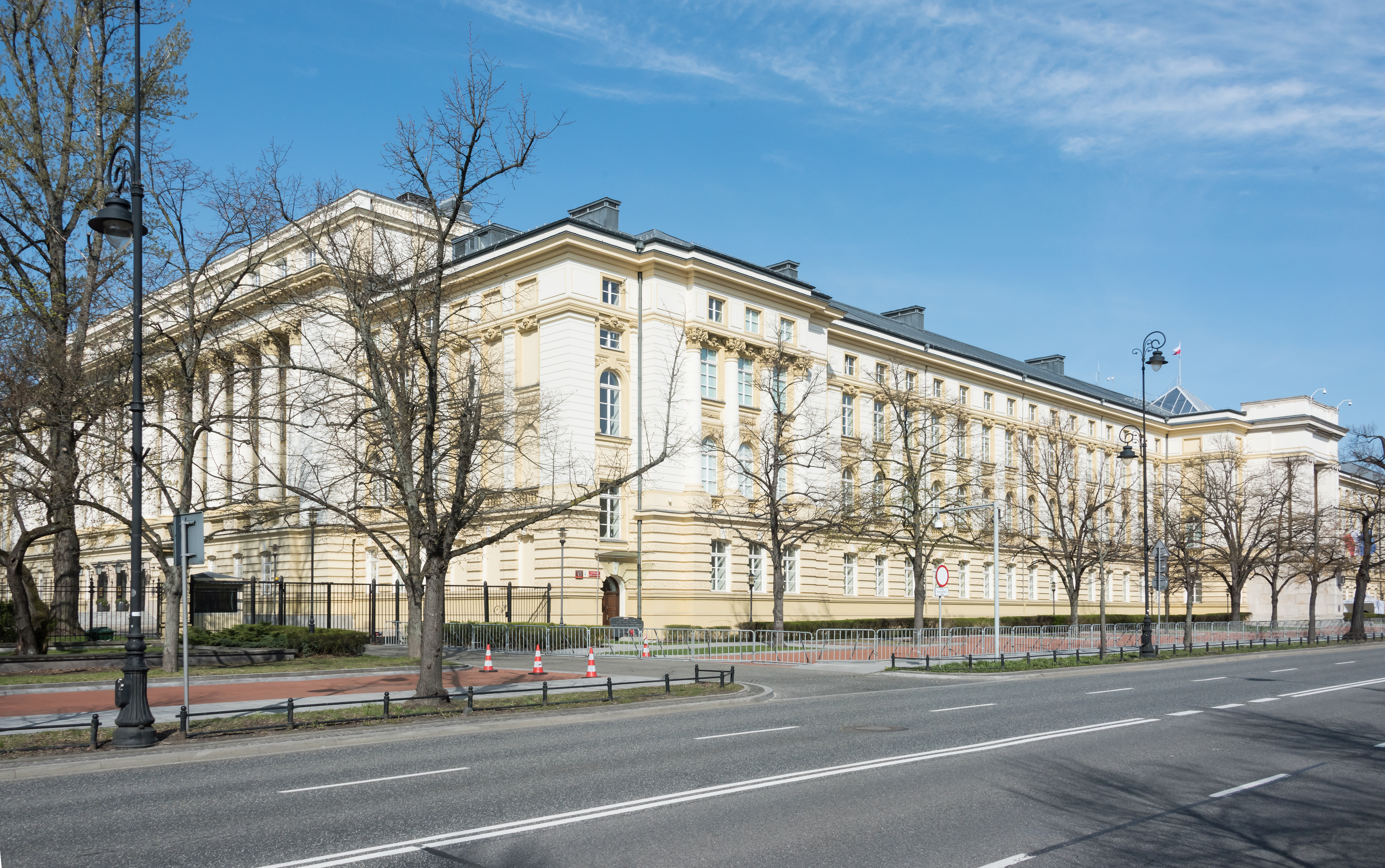
The Building of the Chancellery of the Prime Minister, the location of the Chancellery, is home to the premier's executive office and support staff.

The prime minister's executive office is the Chancellery. Located in the Building of the Chancellery of the Prime Minister along Ujazdów Avenue in Warsaw, the Chancellery houses the central meeting location of the cabinet. As an office, the Chancellery acts to facilitate government policy between the prime minister and the ministers, serves as the premier's support staff, and distributes the administration's information. Additionally in supporting the cabinet, the Chancellery also houses various executive departments answerable directly to the prime minister outside of the council of ministers, including the Economic Council, the Protection Office, and the Civil Service Department.

The official residence of the prime minister is Willa Parkowa, located several minutes' walk from the Chancellery next to Łazienki Park. However, the current Prime Minister Donald Tusk chose to reside in the coastal city of Sopot, near his native Gdańsk in Pomeranian Voivodeship.

The prime minister receives security from the Government Protection Bureau (Biuro Ochrony Rządu) while in office, as well as for six months after departing from the Chancellery.

== List of Polish prime ministers ==
Since the inception of the Third Republic, sixteen individuals have occupied the post. The shortest-serving government was the third government of Mateusz Morawiecki, lasting for 16 days between November and December 2023. The longest-serving prime minister has been Donald Tusk, who held the premiership continuously from 16 November 2007 to 22 September 2014, and again since 13 December 2023. To date, three women, Hanna Suchocka, Ewa Kopacz, and Beata Szydło, have served as prime ministers. Suchocka, along with Tadeusz Mazowiecki and Jerzy Buzek, are the only Polish prime ministers, as of yet, to be invited into the Club of Madrid.

Democratic Union (UD) Liberal Democratic Congress (KLD) Centre Agreement (PC) Polish People's Party (PSL) Social Democracy (SdRP) / Democratic Left Alliance (SLD) Solidarity Electoral Action (AWS) Law and Justice (PiS) / United Right (ZP) Civic Platform (PO) Civic Coalition (KO)

No.	Name	Took office	Left office	Party	Coalition partner(s)	Term in office
1	Tadeusz Mazowiecki	24 August 1989	4 January 1991	Solidarity Citizens' Committee (KO‘S’)/ Democratic Union (UD)	ZSL–PZPR	1 year, 133 days
2	Jan Krzysztof Bielecki	4 January 1991	6 December 1991	Liberal Democratic Congress (KLD)	ZChN–PC–SD	336 days
3	Jan Olszewski	6 December 1991	5 June 1992	Centre Agreement (PC)	ZChN–PSL.PL-PChD	182 days
4	Waldemar Pawlak	5 June 1992	10 July 1992	Polish People's Party (PSL)	None	35 days
5	Hanna Suchocka	11 July 1992	26 October 1993	Democratic Union (UD)	KLD–ZChN–PChD–PPPP–PSL.PL-PPG-SLCh	1 year, 107 days
6	Waldemar Pawlak	26 October 1993	7 March 1995	Polish People's Party (PSL)	SLD–UP–BBWR	1 year, 132 days
7	Józef Oleksy	7 March 1995	7 February 1996	Social Democracy (SdRP)	PSL	337 days
8	Włodzimierz Cimoszewicz	7 February 1996	31 October 1997	Social Democracy (SdRP)	PSL	1 year, 266 days
9	Jerzy Buzek	31 October 1997	19 October 2001	Solidarity Electoral Action (AWS)	UW–SKL–ZChN–PPChD	3 years, 353 days
10	Leszek Miller	19 October 2001	2 May 2004	Democratic Left Alliance (SLD)	UP–PSL	2 years, 196 days
11	Marek Belka	2 May 2004	31 October 2005	Democratic Left Alliance (SLD)	UP	1 year, 182 days
12	Kazimierz Marcinkiewicz	31 October 2005	14 July 2006	Law and Justice (PiS)	SRP–LPR	256 days
13	Jarosław Kaczyński	14 July 2006	16 November 2007	Law and Justice (PiS)	SRP–LPR	1 year, 125 days
14	Donald Tusk	16 November 2007	22 September 2014	Civic Platform (PO)	PSL	6 years, 310 days
15	Ewa Kopacz	22 September 2014	16 November 2015	Civic Platform (PO)	PSL	1 year, 55 days
16	Beata Szydło	16 November 2015	11 December 2017	United Right (ZP)	Agreement–United Poland	2 years, 25 days
17	Mateusz Morawiecki	11 December 2017	13 December 2023	United Right (ZP)	United Poland	6 years, 2 days
18	Donald Tusk	13 December 2023	Incumbent	Civic Coalition (KO)	PSL-PL2050-NL	2 years, 268 days

== See also ==
- Cabinet of Poland
- Deputy Prime Minister of Poland
- List of Polish monarchs
- President of Poland
- Sejm
- Senat

== Works cited ==
- Bernhard, Michael (2005). Institutions and the Fate of Democracy: Germany and Poland in the Twentieth Century. Pittsburgh: University of Pittsburgh Press. ISBN 9780822958703.
- Brodecki, Zdzisław; Jankowski, Bartlomiej (2003). "The Political System of the Republic of Poland". In Zdzisław Brodecki (ed.). Polish Business Law. The Hague: Kluwer Law International. ISBN 978-90-411-1992-6.
- Cole, Daniel H. (22 September 1998). "Poland's 1997 Constitution in its Historical Context" (PDF). Indiana University School of Law. Archived (PDF) from the original on 9 October 2022.
- Enyedi, György; Tózsa, István (2004). The Region: Regional Development, Policy, Administration, E-government. Budapest: Akadémiai Kiadó. ISBN 978-963-05-8037-3.
- Fijałkowski, Agata (2010). The New Europe: The Polish Struggle for Democracy and Constitutionalism. Farnham, England: Ashgate Publishing, Ltd. ISBN 978-1-4094-9708-0.
- Garlicki, Lech (2005). "Constitutional Law". In Stanisław Frankowski (ed.). Introduction to Polish law. The Hague: Kluwer Law International. ISBN 978-90-411-2331-2.
- Goldman, Minton F. (1997). Revolution and Change in Central and Eastern Europe: Political, Economic and Social Challenges. Armonk, NY: M.E. Sharpe. ISBN 978-0-7656-3901-1.
- Kochanski, Halik (2012). The Eagle Unbowed: Poland and the Poles in the Second World War. Cambridge, MA: Harvard University Press. ISBN 978-0-674-06816-2.
- Lasok, Dominik. "The Polish Constitutions of 1947 and 1952: A Historical Study of Constitutional Law" (PDF). London School of Economics. Archived (PDF) from the original on 26 October 2014.
- Lerski, Halina (30 January 1996). Historical Dictionary of Poland, 966–1945. Santa Barbara, CA: ABC-CLIO. ISBN 978-0-313-03456-5.
- Leśnodorski, Bogusław (1947). Parlamentaryzm w Polsce (in Polish). Kraków: M. Kot.
- Linz, Juan J; Stepan, Alfred (2011). Problems of Democratic Transition and Consolidation: Southern Europe, South America, and Post-Communist Europe. Baltimore: Johns Hopkins University Press. ISBN 978-1-4214-0492-9.
- Ludwikowski, Rett R. (1996). Constitution-Making in the Region of the former Soviet Dominance. Durham, NC: Duke University Press. ISBN 978-0-8223-1802-6.
- Lukowski, Jerzy; Zawadzki, Hubert (2006). A Concise History of Poland. Cambridge, England: Cambridge University Press. ISBN 978-0-521-85332-3.
- Osiatyński, Wiktor (1996). Jon Elster (ed.). The Roundtable Talks and the Breakdown of Communism. Chicago: University of Chicago Press. ISBN 978-0-226-20628-8.
- Prokop, Krzysztof (2010). "The Institution of the President in the Visegrad Group States". In Jarosław Matwiejuk; Krzysztof Prokop (eds.). Evolution of Constitutionalism in the Selected States of Central and Eastern Europe. Białystok: Wydawnictwo Temida 2. ISBN 978-83-89620-87-3.
- Prokop, Krzysztof (2011). Białystok Law Books 7, Polish Constitutional Law. Białystok: Wydawnictwo Temida 2. ISBN 978-83-62813-13-1.
- Schwartz, Herman (2002). The Struggle for Constitutional Justice in Post-Communist Europe. Chicago: University of Chicago Press. ISBN 978-0-226-74196-3.
- Simon, Maurice D. (1996). "Institutional Development of Poland's Post-Communist Sejm: A Comparative Analysis". In David M. Olson; Philip Norton (eds.). The New Parliaments of Central and Eastern Europe. London: Frank Cass. ISBN 978-0-7146-4261-1.
- Szczerbiak, Alek (2011). Poland Within the European Union. London: Routledge. ISBN 978-0-415-38073-7.
- Van Hoorn, Judith L. (2000). "An Introduction to Poland". In Judith L. Van Hoorn; Ákos Komlósi; Elzbieta Suchar; Doreen A. Samelson (eds.). Adolescent Development and Rapid Social Change: Perspectives from Eastern Europe. Albany, NY: SUNY Press. ISBN 978-0-7914-9312-0.
- Zubek, Radosław (2006). "Poland: A Core Ascendant?". In Vesselin Dimitrov; Klaus H. Goetz; Hellmut Wollmann (eds.). Governing After Communism: Institutions And Policymaking. Lanham, MD: Rowman & Littlefield. ISBN 978-0-7425-4009-5.
