= Small Constitution =

Small Constitution (or Little Constitution, Polish: Mała Konstytucja) can refer to three constitutions of Poland:

- Small Constitution of 1919
- Small Constitution of 1947
- Small Constitution of 1992
