= Constitution of Poland =

Constitution of the Republic of Poland
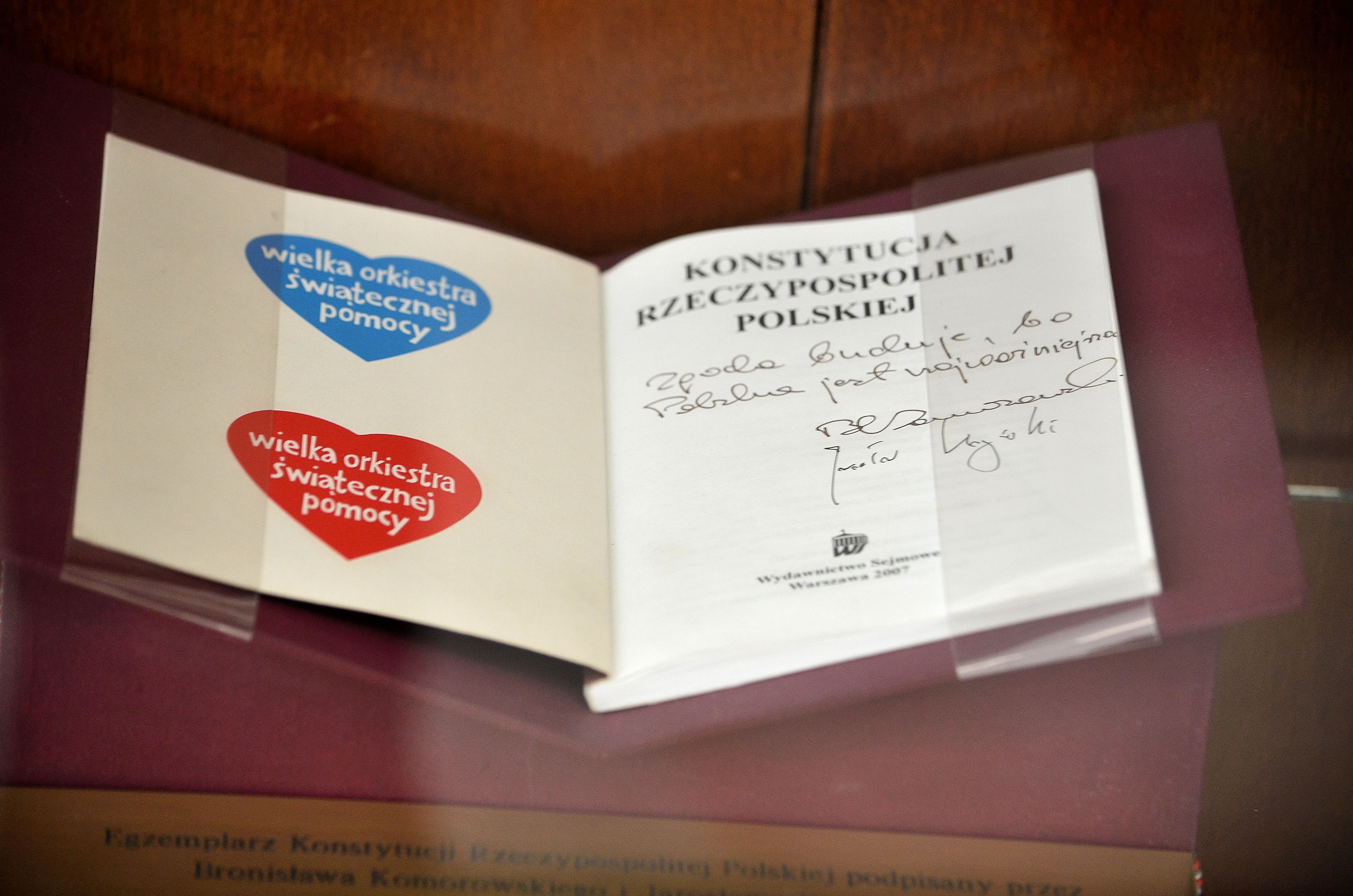
- A copy of the Constitution signed by candidates after the debate of 2 July, before the 2010 Polish presidential election, exhibited in the Sejm

Overview
- Jurisdiction: Poland
- Ratified: 2 April 1997
- Date effective: 17 October 1997
- System: Unitary parliamentary constitutional representative democratic republic

Government structure
- Branches: 3
- Head of state: President
- Chambers: Sejm; Senate
- Executive: Council of Ministers; President
- Judiciary: Supreme Court; Supreme Administrative Court; Constitutional Tribunal; State Tribunal
- Federalism: Unitary
- Electoral college: No
- Last amended: 21 October 2009
- Author(s): Komisja Konstytucyjna Zgromadzenia Narodowego
- Signatories: Aleksander Kwaśniewski
- Supersedes: Small Constitution of 1992

Full text
- Constitution of the Republic of Poland at Wikisource

The Constitution of the Republic of Poland (Polish: Konstytucja Rzeczypospolitej Polskiej or Konstytucja RP for short) is the supreme law of the Republic of Poland, which is also commonly called the Third Polish Republic (Polish: III Rzeczpospolita or III RP for short) in contrast with the preceding systems.

The current constitution was ratified on 2 April 1997. The Constitution is also commonly referred to as the 1997 Constitution. It replaced the Small Constitution of 1992, a revision of the 1952 Constitution of the Polish People's Republic. It was adopted by the National Assembly of Poland on 2 April 1997, approved by a national referendum on 25 May 1997, promulgated by the President of the Republic on 16 July 1997, and came into force on 17 October 1997.

Poland (and its predecessor states) have had numerous constitutions throughout history; the 1505 Nihil novi was one of the first European constitutional acts. Historically, the most significant is the Constitution of 3 May 1791.

== The Constitution ==
=== New character of the nation ===
The five years after 1992 were spent in dialogue about the new character of Poland. The nation had changed significantly since 1952 when the Constitution of the Polish People's Republic was instituted. A new consensus was needed on how to acknowledge the awkward parts of Polish history; the transformation from a one-party system into a multi-party one and from socialism towards a free market economic system; and the rise of pluralism alongside Poland's historically Roman Catholic culture.

=== Old and new policies ===
The attitude toward the past was articulated in the preamble, in which the citizens of Poland established a Republic "Recalling the best traditions of the First and the Second Republic, Obliged to bequeath to future generations all that is valuable from our over one thousand years' heritage ... Mindful of the bitter experiences of the times when fundamental freedoms and human rights were violated in our Homeland, ...".

Many articles were written explicitly to rectify the wrongs of previous governments. Article 21 protects the rights of ownership and inheritance, but the post-World War II PKWN-decreed and implemented land reform was not invalidated. Article 23 thus established the family farm as the basis of the agricultural economy. Article 74 requires public officials to pursue ecologically sound public policy. Articles 39 and 40 prohibit the practices of forced medical experimentation, forbidding torture and corporal punishment, while Articles 50 and 59 acknowledge the inviolability of the home, the right to form trade unions, and to strike.

=== Tradition versus pluralism ===
Those involved in drafting the document were not interested in creating a de facto Catholic Poland. That said, nods were given in the direction of the church, to the effect of protecting common morality. For example, in Article 18, marriage is granted the protection of the state, and in Article 53, freedom of religion, religious education, and religious upbringing are protected.

The preamble emphasizes freedom of religion or disbelief: "We, the Polish Nation – all citizens of the Republic, Both those who believe in God as the source of truth, justice, good and beauty, As well as those not sharing such faith but respecting those universal values as arising from other sources...". Article 25 provides further protection, that public officials "shall be impartial in matters of personal conviction, whether religious or philosophical, or in relation to outlooks on life, and shall ensure their freedom of expression within public life."

Other aspects include the affirmation of the political equality of man and woman in Article 33, and the affirmation of freedom of ethnic minorities to advance and develop their culture, in Article 35.

=== Preamble ===
Having regard for the existence and future of our Homeland,

Which recovered, in 1989, the possibility of a sovereign and democratic determination of its fate,
We, the Polish Nation – all citizens of the Republic,
Both those who believe in God as the source of truth, justice, good and beauty,
As well as those not sharing such faith but respecting those universal values as arising from other sources,
Equal in rights and obligations towards the common good – Poland,
Beholden to our ancestors for their labors, their struggle for independence achieved at great sacrifice, for our culture rooted in the Christian heritage of the Nation and in universal human values,
Recalling the best traditions of the First and the Second Republic,
Obliged to bequeath to future generations all that is valuable from our over one thousand years' heritage,
Bound in community with our compatriots dispersed throughout the world,
Aware of the need for cooperation with all countries for the good of the Human Family,
Mindful of the bitter experiences of the times when fundamental freedoms and human rights were violated in our Homeland,
Desiring to guarantee the rights of the citizens for all time, and to ensure diligence and efficiency in the work of public bodies,
Recognizing our responsibility before God or our own consciences,
Hereby establish this Constitution of the Republic of Poland as the basic law for the State, based on respect for freedom and justice, cooperation between the public powers, social dialogue as well as on the principle of subsidiarity in the strengthening the powers of citizens and their communities.

We call upon all those who will apply this Constitution for the good of the Third Republic to do so paying respect to the inherent dignity of the person, his or her right to freedom, the obligation of solidarity with others, and respect for these principles as the unshakeable foundation of the Republic of Poland.

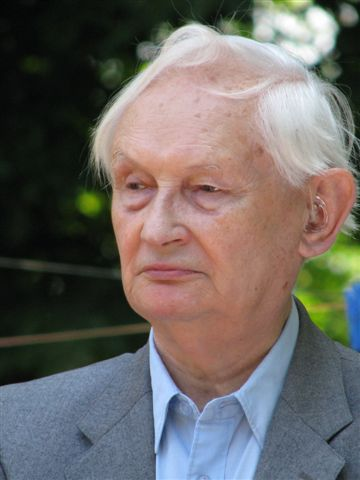
Stefan Wilkanowicz
developed the preamble

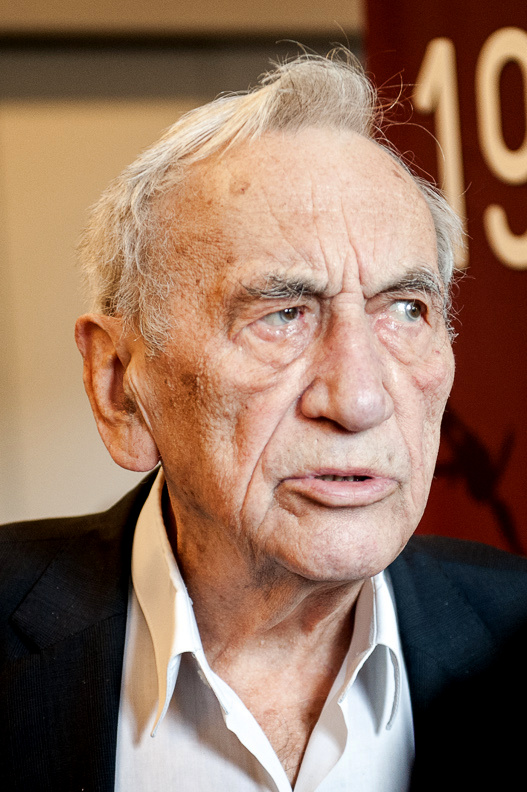
Tadeusz Mazowiecki
presented the finally adopted preamble

== Historical constitutions ==
=== Kingdom of Poland and the Polish–Lithuanian Commonwealth ===
The first major privilege was granted in Košice by Louis Andegavin on 17 September 1374. In order to guarantee the Polish throne for his daughter Jadwiga, he agreed to abolish all but one tax the szlachta was required to pay. The Koszyce Privilege also forbade the king to grant official posts and major Polish castles to foreign knights, and obliged him to pay indemnities to nobles injured or taken captive during a war outside Polish borders.

The privileges granted by Ladislaus II at Brześć Kujawski (25 April 1425), Jedlnia (4 March 1430) and Kraków (9 January 1433) introduced or confirmed the rule known as Neminem captivabimus nisi iure victum which prevented a noble from being arrested unless found guilty. On 2 May 1447, the same king issued the Wilno Privilege which gave the Lithuanian boyars the same rights as those possessed by the Polish szlachta.

In September and October 1454, Casimir IV granted the Cerkwica and Nieszawa Privileges which forbade the king to set new taxes, laws or draft nobles for war unless he had the consent of local diets (sejmiki). These privileges were demanded by the szlachta as a compensation for their participation in the Thirteen Years' War. As a compensation for the unsuccessful incursion on Moldavia which had decimated the szlachta, John Albert granted the Piotrków Privilege on 26 April 1496 which prohibited serfs from leaving their owners' land, and banned city dwellers from buying land.

In the spring of 1505 king Alexander signed a bill adopted by the Diet of Radom known as Nihil novi nisi commune consensu ("Nothing new without a common agreement"). The Nihil novi act transferred legislative power from the king to the Diet (Sejm), or Polish parliament. This date marked the beginning of the First Rzeczpospolita, the period of a szlachta-run "republic".

Until the death of Sigismund Augustus, the last king of the Jagiellonian dynasty, monarchs could only be elected from within the royal family. However, starting from 1573, practically any Polish noble or foreigner of royal blood could become a Polish–Lithuanian monarch. Every newly elected king was required sign two documents – the Pacta conventa ("agreed pacts") – a confirmation of the king's pre-election promises, and Henrican articles (artykuły henrykowskie, named after the first freely elected king, Henry of Valois). The latter document served as a virtual Polish constitution and contained the basic laws of the Commonwealth:

- free election of kings;
- religious tolerance;
- the Diet to be gathered every two years;
- foreign policy controlled by the Diet;
- a royal advisory council chosen by the Diet;
- official posts restricted to Polish and Lithuanian nobles;
- taxes and monopolies set up by the Diet only;
- nobles' right to disobey the king should he break any of these laws.

Sejm Constitution of 1590

In the 18th century, the introduction of Cardinal Laws in 1768 was an important step towards codifying the existing Polish law.

=== May Constitution, 1791 ===
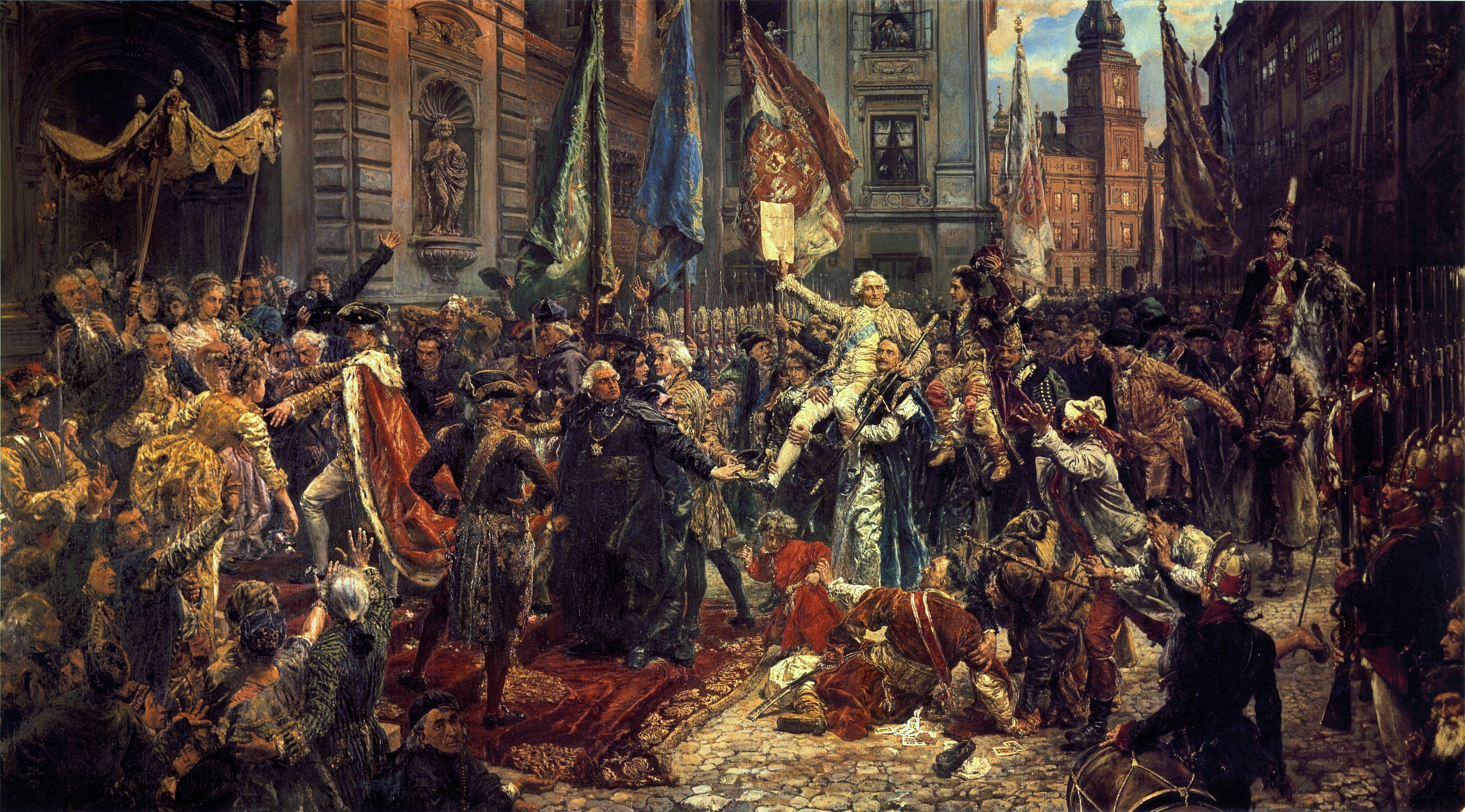
3 May 1791 Constitution (painting by Jan Matejko, 1891). King Stanisław August (left, in regal ermine-trimmed cloak), enters St. John's Cathedral, where Sejm deputies will swear to uphold the new Constitution; in background, Warsaw's Royal Castle, where the Constitution has just been adopted.

The Polish Constitution of 3 May 1791 (Polish: Konstytucja Trzeciego Maja) is called the first constitution in Europe by historian Norman Davies. It was instituted by the Government Act (Polish: Ustawa rządowa) adopted on that date by the Sejm (parliament) of the Polish–Lithuanian Commonwealth. It was designed to redress long-standing political defects of the federative Polish–Lithuanian Commonwealth and its Golden Liberty. The Constitution introduced political equality between townspeople and nobility (szlachta) and placed the peasants under the protection of the government, thus mitigating the worst abuses of serfdom. The Constitution abolished pernicious parliamentary institutions such as the liberum veto, which at one time had placed the sejm at the mercy of any deputy who might choose, or be bribed by an interest or foreign power, to undo all the legislation that had been passed by that sejm. The May 3rd Constitution sought to supplant the existing anarchy fostered by some of the country's reactionary magnats, with a more egalitarian and democratic constitutional monarchy.

The adoption of the May 3rd Constitution provoked the active hostility of the Polish Commonwealth's neighbors. In the War in Defense of the Constitution (1792), Poland was betrayed by its Prussian ally Frederick William II and defeated by the Imperial Russia of Catherine the Great, allied with the Targowica Confederation, a cabal of Polish magnates who opposed reforms that might weaken their influence. Despite the defeat, and the subsequent Second Partition of Poland, the May 3rd Constitution influenced later democratic movements in the world. Ultimately, Prussia, Austria and Russia partitioned Poland in 1795. It remained, after the demise of the Polish Kingdom in 1795, over the next 123 years of Polish partitions, a beacon in the struggle to restore Polish sovereignty. In the words of two of its co-authors, Ignacy Potocki and Hugo Kołłątaj, it was "the last will and testament of the expiring Fatherland."

=== 19th century ===
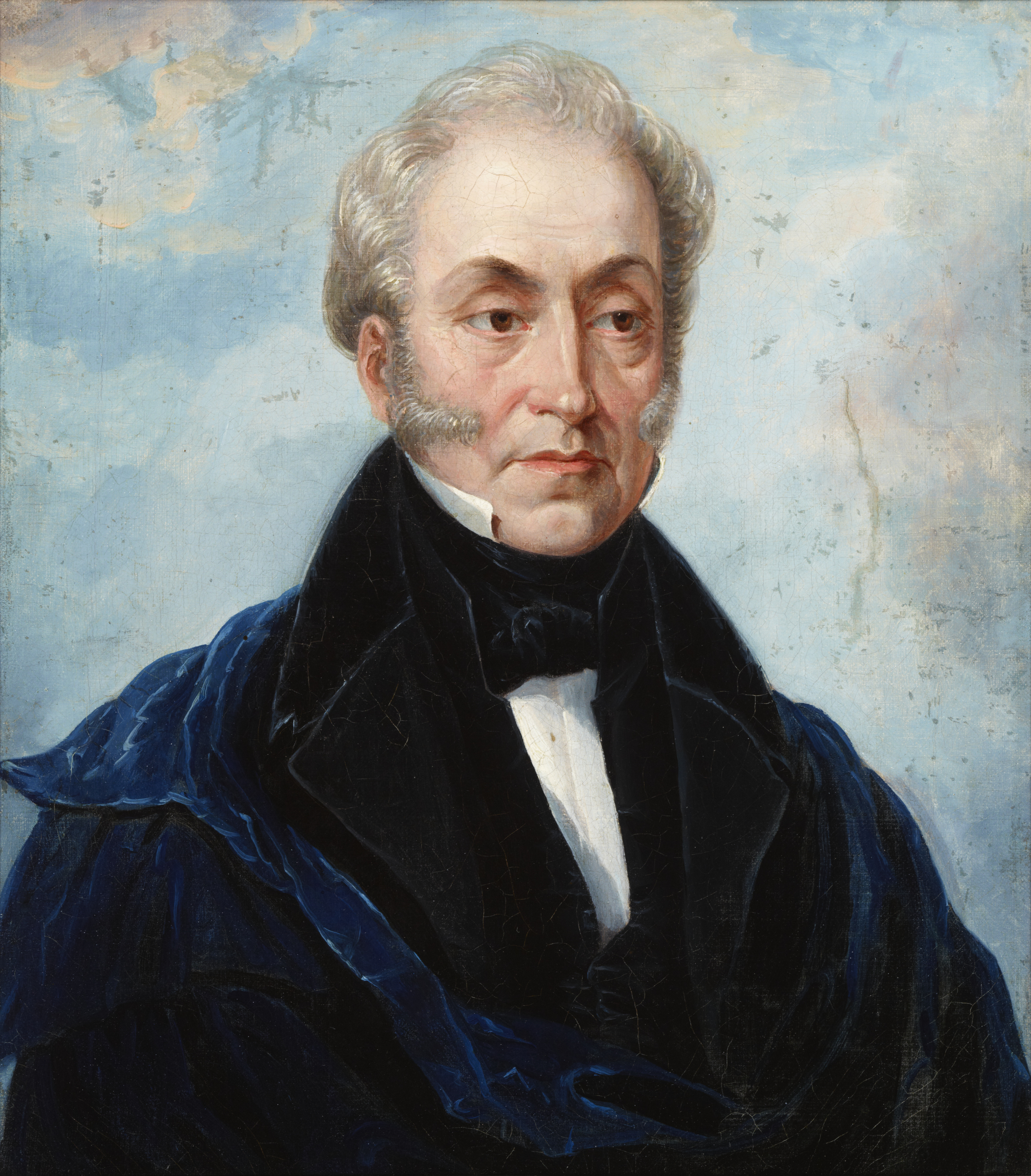
Adam Jerzy Czartoryski
Co-author
Constitution of the Kingdom of Poland

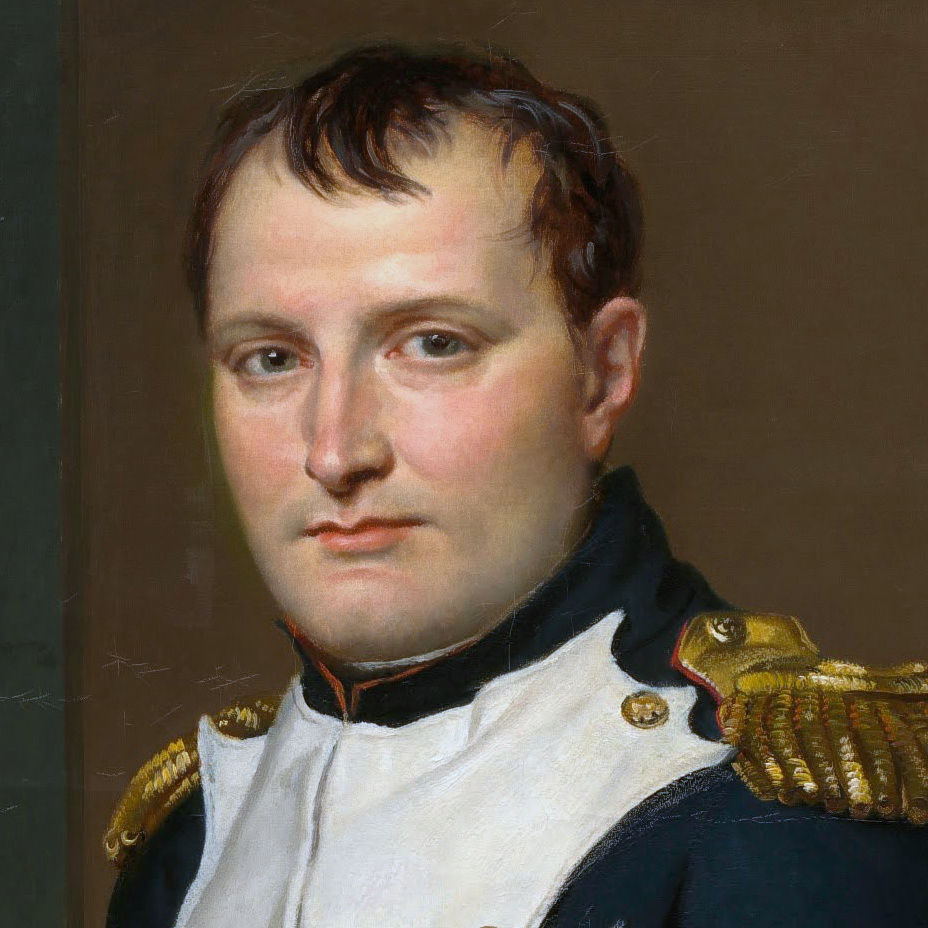
Napoleon
Granted constitution to the Duchy of Warsaw
- Duchy of Warsaw, 1806
- Constitution of the Kingdom of Poland, 1815
- Constitution of the Free City of Kraków, 1815

=== Second Polish Republic (1919–1939) ===
The Second Polish Republic had three constitutions. They were, in historical order:

- Small Constitution, 1919
- March Constitution, 1921
- April Constitution, 1935

=== Polish People's Republic (1945–1989) ===
The Manifesto of the Polish Committee of National Liberation condemned the April Constitution of 1935 as "unlawful and fascist" and stated that the March Constitution of 1921 would be the Polish constitution until a new one could be written. The new constitution was the Small Constitution of 1947, later succeeded by the Constitution of the Polish People's Republic in 1952.

=== Third Polish Republic (1989–1997) ===
Prior to the current 1997 Constitution, the country was governed by the Small Constitution of 1992, which amended the main articles of the Constitution of the Polish People's Republic and formed the legal basis of the Polish State between 1992 and 1997.

== See also ==
- List of national constitutions
- Polish Constitutional Tribunal crisis (2015 – ongoing)
