= 1997 Polish constitutional referendum =

- 25 May 1997
- Are you in favor of the adoption of the Constitution of the Republic of Poland passed by the National Assembly on April 2, 1997?
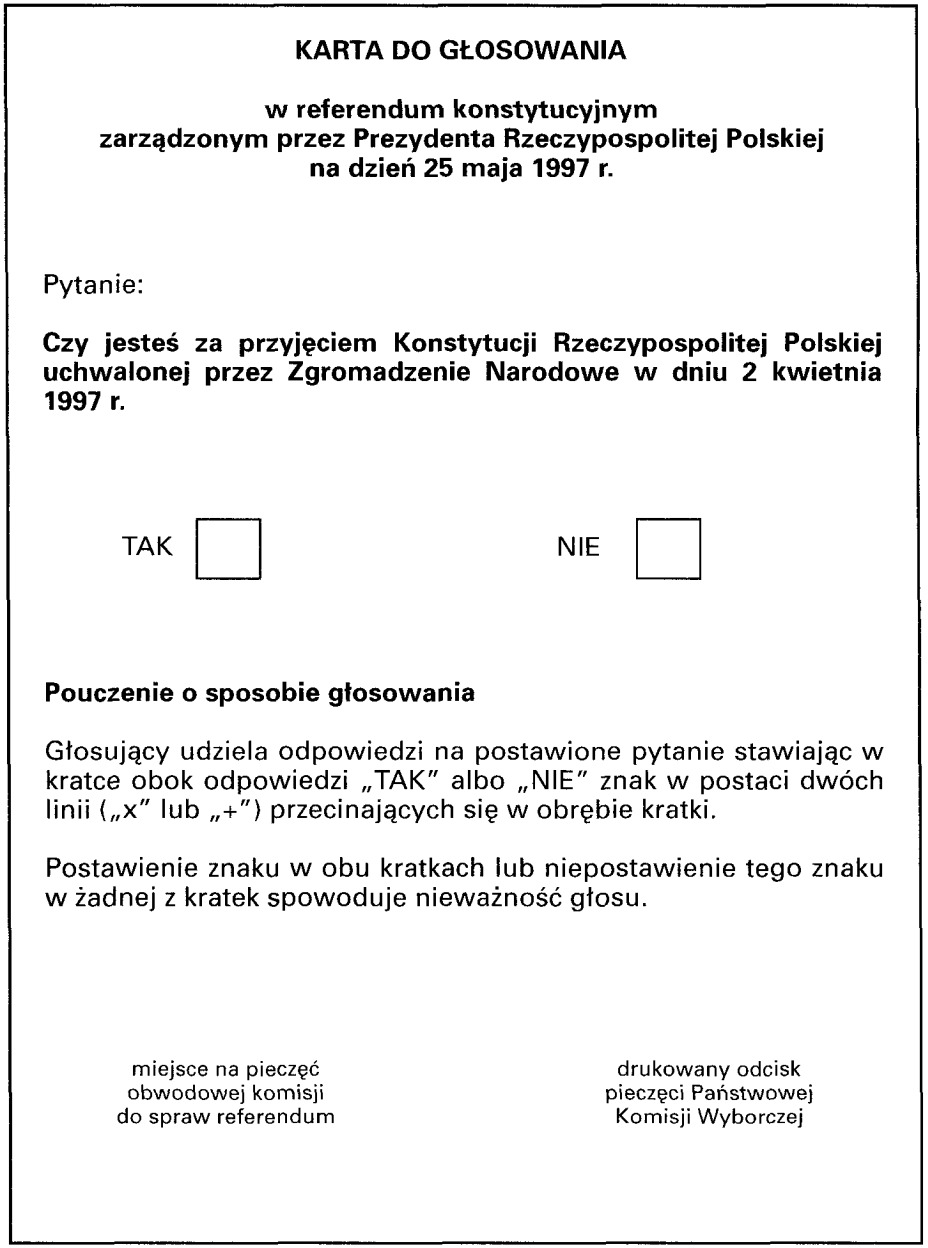
- Paper ballot that was used in the referendum, without the PKW stamp.

Results
Choice	Votes	%
Yes	6,396,641	53.45%
No	5,570,493	46.55%
Valid votes	11,967,134	98.60%
Invalid or blank votes	170,002	1.40%
Total votes	12,137,136	100.00%
Registered voters/turnout	28,319,650	42.86%
- Results by voivodeship For: 50–60% >60% Against: 50–60% 60–70% >70%

A constitutional referendum was held in Poland on 25 May 1997. It was decreed by then-President Aleksander Kwaśniewski on the day the National Assembly adopted the Constitution. Voters were asked whether they approved of a new constitution, and replace the temporary constitution from 1992. It was narrowly approved, with 53.45% voting in favour. Voter turnout was 43%, below the 50% required by the 1995 Referendum Act to validate the referendum. However, the Supreme Court ruled on 15 July that the 1992 'small' constitution (which did not contain turnout requirements) took precedence over the Referendum Act and that the constitution could be introduced.

== Question ==
Are you in favor of the adoption of the Constitution of the Republic of Poland passed by the National Assembly on April 2, 1997?

== Ballot ==
The text (translated from Polish) on the paper ballot was as follows:

=== Ballot paper ===
in the constitutional referendum ordered by the President of the Republic of Poland for May 25, 1997.

Question:

Are you in favor of the adoption of the Constitution of the Republic of Poland passed by the National Assembly on April 2, 1997?

☐ YES ☐ NO

Instructions on how to vote

The voter answers the question by placing a mark in the box next to the answer “YES” or “NO” in the form of two intersecting lines (“x” or “+”) within the box.

Placing a mark in both boxes or not placing a mark in any box will result in the vote being invalid.

place for the seal
of the district commission
for referendum matters

printed imprint
of the National
Electoral Commission seal

== Results ==
Choice	Votes	%
For	6,396,641	53.45
Against	5,570,493	46.55
Total	11,967,134	100.00
Valid votes	11,967,134	98.60
Invalid/blank votes	170,002	1.40
Total votes	12,137,136	100.00
Registered voters/turnout	28,319,650	42.86
