= Constitution of 1947 =

Constitution of 1947 may refer to:

- 1947 Chinese Constitution
- 1947 Constitution of New Jersey
- Small Constitution of 1947, temporary constitution of Poland
- Constitution of Italy, passed in 1947
- Showa Constitution, the current Japanese Constitution that was enacted in 1947.
