= Statue of Józef Piłsudski (Goleniów) =

2000 bronze sculpture in Szczecin, Poland

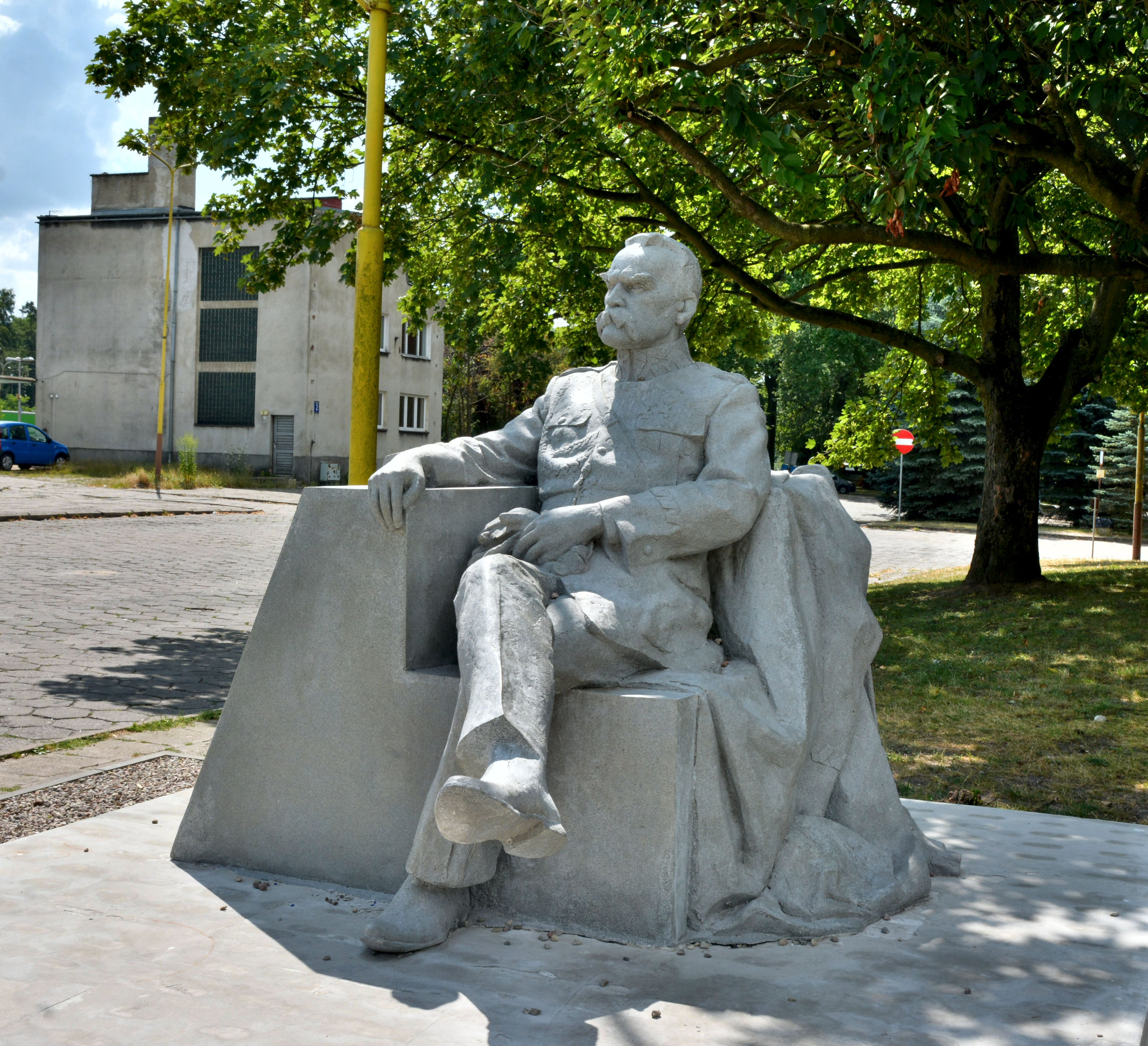
- The monument in 2019.
- Interactive map of Statue of Józef Piłsudski
- Location: Józef Piłsudski Square, Goleniów, Poland
- Coordinates: 53°33′34.3″N 14°50′19.5″E
- Designer: Monika Szpener
- Type: Statue
- Material: Epoxy resin
- Opening date: 11 November 2018
- Dedicated to: Józef Piłsudski

The statue of Józef Piłsudski (Polish: Pomnik Józefa Piłsudskiego) is a monument in Goleniów, Poland. It is placed at the Józef Piłsudski Square, in front of the Goleniów railway station. It is dedicated to Józef Piłsudski, a 19th- and 20th-century military officer and statesman, who, served as the Chief of State and Marshal of Poland, and later was the de factor leader of the country, as the Minister of Military Affairs. The monument consist of his statue, made from an epoxy resin, depicting him in a sitting position. The monument was designed by Monika Szpener, and unveiled on 11 November 2018, on the 100th anniversary of the independence of Poland, as part of the celebration of the National Independence Day.

== History ==
The monument is dedicated to Józef Piłsudski, a 19th- and 20th-century military officer and statesman, who, served as the Chief of State and Marshal of Poland, and later was the de factor leader of the country, as the Minister of Military Affairs. It was designed by Monika Szpener, and unveiled on 11 November 2018, on the 100th anniversary of the independence of Poland, as part of the celebration of the National Independence Day.

== Design ==
The monument is made from an epoxy resin, and includes a statue of Józef Piłsudski. He is depicted in a relaxed sitting position, in an elderly age, with characteristic large moustage, and wearing a military uniform. It is placed at the Józef Piłsudski Square, in front of the Goleniów railway station.
