= Constitution of 1919 =

Constitution of 1919 may refer to:

- Small Constitution of 1919, Poland
- Dáil Constitution, Ireland
- Constitution of Germany (1919), Weimar Constitution
