= Electoral districts of Poland (1935–1939) =

According to the 1935 Polish Constitution, the country was divided into 104 electoral districts, and the Sejm consisted of 208 members. The districts were described in a July 8, 1935, edition of the Journal of Laws of the Republic of Poland, and were:

- District 1 – Warsaw

City of Warsaw Police districts I, II, XII, XXVI,

- District 2 – Warsaw

City of Warsaw Police districts III, IV, V,

- District 3 – Warsaw

City of Warsaw Police districts VI, VII, XIX, XXII,

- District 4 – Warsaw

City of Warsaw Police districts VIII, XI, XVI, XXIII,

- District 5 – Warsaw

City of Warsaw Police districts IX, X, XIII, XX, XXI

- District 6 – Warsaw

Warsaw borough of Praga,

- District 7 – Warsaw

County of Warsaw – Land,

- District 8 – Pułtusk

Counties of Pułtusk, Radzymin County, and Mińsk Mazowiecki County,

- District 9 – Mława

Counties of Mława, Ciechanów County, Przasnysz County, and Maków Mazowiecki County,

- District 10 – Sierpc

Counties of Sierpc, Rypin County, and Lipno,

- District 11 – Włocławek

Counties of Włocławek, Nieszawa County, and Kutno County,

- District 12 – Płock

Counties of Płock, Płońsk County, and Gostynin County,

- District 13 – Łowicz

Counties of Łowicz, Sochaczew County, and Błonie County

- District 14 – Skierniewice

Counties of Skierniewice, Grójec, and Rawa Mazowiecka County

- District 15 – Łódź

City of Łódź Police districts II, III, V,

- District 16 – Łódź

City of Łódź Police districts I, IV, VI, VII, X,

- District 17 – Łódź

City of Łódź Police districts VIII, IX, XI, XII, XIII, XIV,

- District 18 – Łódź

Counties of Łódź – Land, and Łęczyca County,

- District 19 – Koło

Counties of Koło and Konin County,

- District 20 – Kalisz

Counties of Kalisz and Turek County,

- District 21 – Sieradz

Counties of Sieradz and Łask County,

- District 22 – Piotrków Trybunalski

Counties of Piotrków and Brzeziny County,

- District 23 – Radomsko

Counties of Radomsko and Wieluń County,

- District 24 – Kielce

Counties of Kielce and Włoszczowa County,

- District 25 – Częstochowa

Counties of Częstochowa – City, and Częstochowa – Land,

- District 26 – Zawiercie

Counties of Zawiercie and Olkusz County,

- District 27 – Sosnowiec

Counties of Sosnowiec – City and Będzin County,

- District 28 – Jędrzejów

Counties of Jędrzejów, Miechów County, and Pińczów County,

- District 29 – Sandomierz

Counties of Sandomierz and Stopnica County,

- District 30 – Opatów

Counties of Opatów and Iłża County,

- District 31 – Końskie

Counties of Końskie and Opoczno County,

- District 32 – Radom

Counties of Radom – City, Radom – Land, and Kozienice County,

- District 33 – Lublin

Counties of Lublin – City, and Lublin – Land,

- District 34 – Puławy

Counties of Puławy and Janów County,

- District 35 – Zamość

Counties of Zamość, Biłgoraj County, and Tomaszów County,

- District 36 – Chełm

Counties of Chełm, Krasnystaw County, and Hrubieszów County,

- District 37 – Biała Podlaska

Counties of Biała Podlaska, Radzyń, and Włodawa County,

- District 38 – Łuków

Counties of Łuków, Garwolin, and Lubartów,

- District 39 – Siedlce

Counties of Siedlce, Sokołów and Węgrów,

- District 40 – Białystok

Counties of Białystok – City, Białystok – Land, and Szczuczyn,

- District 41 – Ostrów Mazowiecka

Counties of Ostrów Mazowiecka, Wysokie Mazowieckie County, and Bielsk Podlaski County,

- District 42 – Łomża

Counties of Łomża and Ostrołęka County,

- District 43 – Suwałki

Counties of Suwałki, Augustów County, and Sokółka County,

- District 44 – Grodno

Counties of Grodno, and Wolkowysk County,

- District 45 – Wilno

City of Wilno Police districts I, II, VI, and the town of Nowa Wilejka,

- District 46 – Wilno

City of Wilno Police districts III, IV, and V,

- District 47 – Wilno

Counties of Wilno – Troki County (without the town of Nowa Wilejka), and Święciany County,

- District 48 – Glebokie

Counties of Dzisna County, Braslaw County, and Postawy County,

- District 49 – Oszmiana

Counties of Oszmiana, Wilejka County, and Molodeczno County,

- District 50 – Lida

Counties of Lida, and Wolozyn County,

- District 51 – Nowogródek

Counties of Nowogródek, Szczuczyn County, and Slonim County,

- District 52 – Baranowicze

Counties of Baranowicze, Nieswiez, and Stolpce,

- District 53 – Brzesc nad Bugiem

Counties of Brzesc, and Pruzana County,

- District 54 – Kobryn

Counties of Kobryn, Drohiczyn County, Kosow Poleski County, and Kamien Koszyrski County,

- District 55 – Pinsk

Counties of Pinsk, Luniniec County, and Stolin County,

- District 56 – Luck

Counties of Luck, and Horochow County,

- District 57 – Kowel

Counties of Kowel, Luboml County, and Wlodzimierz Wolynski County,

- District 58 – Sarny

Counties of Sarny, and Kostopol County,

- District 59 – Rowne

Counties of Rowne, and Zdołbunów County,

- District 60 – Krzemieniec

Counties of Krzemieniec, and Dubno County,

- District 61 – Tarnopol

Counties of Tarnopol, Zbaraz County, and Skalat County,

- District 62 – Złoczów

Counties of Złoczów, Kamionka Strumilowa County, Radziechów County, and Brody County,

- District 63 – Brzeżany

Counties of Brzeżany, Przemyslany County, and Zborow County,

- District 64 – Buczacz

Counties of Buczacz, Trembowla County, and Podhajce County,

- District 65 – Czortków

Counties of Czortków, Kopczynce County, Borszczow County, and Zaleszczyki County,

- District 66 – Stanisławów

Counties of Stanisławów, Tlumacz County, and Nadworna County,

- District 67 – Kolomyja

Counties of Kolomyja, Horodenka County, Sniatyn County, and Kosow County,

- District 68 – Kalusz

Counties of Kalusz, Rohatyn County, and Dolina County,

- District 69 – Stryj

Counties of Stryj, Zydaczow County, and Bobrka County,

- District 70 – Lwów

City of Lwów Police districts II, III, V, VIII, IX

- District 71 – Lwów

City of Lwów Police districts I, IV, VI, VII, X

- District 72 – Lwów

Counties of Lwów – Land, Grodek Jagiellonski County, and Mosciska County,

- District 73 – Sokal

Counties of Sokal, Zolkiew County, Rawa Ruska County, and Lubaczów County,

- District 74 – Przemyśl

Counties of Przemyśl, Jarosław County, and Jaworów County,

- District 75 – Drohobycz

Counties of Drohobycz, and Rudki County,

- District 76 – Sambor

Counties of Sambor, Dobromil County, and Turka County,

- District 77 – Sanok

Counties of Sanok, Lesko County, and Krosno County,

- District 78 – Rzeszów

Counties of Rzeszów, Brzozów County, and Kolbuszowa County,

- District 79 – Łańcut

Counties of Łańcut, Przeworsk County, Nisko County, and Tarnobrzeg County,

- District 80 – Kraków

City of Kraków Police districts I, II, III,

- District 81 – Kraków

City of Kraków Police districts IV, V, VI,

- District 82 – Kraków

Counties of Kraków – Land, and Chrzanów County,

- District 83 – Bochnia

Counties of Bochnia, Limanowa County, and Brzesko County,

- District 84 – Tarnów

Counties of Tarnów, Dąbrowa Tarnowska County, and Mielec County,

- District 85 – Jasło

Counties of Jasło, Dębica County, and Gorlice County,

- District 86 – Nowy Sącz

Counties of Nowy Sącz, and Nowy Targ County,

- District 87 – Wadowice

Counties of Wadowice, Żywiec County, and Myślenice County,

- District 88 – Katowice

County of Katowice – City, and the city of Chorzów,

- District 89 – Katowice

County of Katowice – Land,

- District 90 – Świętochłowice

Counties of Świętochłowice, Tarnowskie Góry County, and Lubliniec County,

- District 91 – Rybnik

Counties of Rybnik, and Pszczyna County,

- District 92 – Bielsko-Biała

Counties of Bielsko-Biała – City, Bielsko-Biała – Land, and Cieszyn County,

- District 93 – Poznań

City of Poznań Police districts I, III, IV, V,

- District 94 – Poznań

City of Poznań Police districts II, VI, VII, VIII,

- District 95 – Poznań

Counties of Poznań – Land, Oborniki County, Czarnków County, Międzychód County, Szamotuły County, and Nowy Tomyśl County,

- District 96 – Leszno

Counties of Leszno, Wolsztyn County, Kościan County, Śrem County, Gostyń County, and Rawicz County,

- District 97 – Ostrów Wielkopolski

Counties of Ostrów Wielkopolski, Kępno County, Krotoszyn County, and Jarocin County,

- District 98 – Gniezno

Counties of Gniezno – City, Gniezno – Land, Środa County, Września County, and Wągrowiec County,

- District 99 – Inowrocław

Counties of Inowrocław – City, Inowrocław – Land, Mogilno County, Żnin County, and Szubin County,

- District 100 – Bydgoszcz

Counties of Bydgoszcz – City, Bydgoszcz – Land, Wyrzysk County, and Chodzież County,

- District 101 – Toruń

Counties of Toruń – City, Toruń – Land, Chełmno County, and Wąbrzeźno County,

- District 102 – Grudziądz

Counties of Grudziądz – City, Grudziądz – Land, Brodnica County, Lubawa County, and Działdowo County,

- District 103 – Chojnice

Counties of Chojnice, Sępólno Krajenskie County, Tuchola County, Świecie County, Starogard Gdański County, and Tczew County,

- District 104 – Gdynia

Counties of Gdynia – City, Wejherowo County, Kartuzy County, and Kościerzyna County.

== Sources ==
- Journal of Laws of the Republic of Poland, July 1935, PDF format
