= April Novelization =

1989 changes to the Constitution of the People's Republic of Poland

The April Novelization (Polish: Nowela kwietniowa) was a set of changes (constitutional amendments) to the 1952 Constitution of the People's Republic of Poland, agreed in April 1989, in the aftermath of the Polish Round Table Agreement.

Among key changes were:

- restoration of the Senate of Poland and the post of the president of Poland (the latter annulling the power of the Polish United Workers' Party general secretary)
- introduction of the National Council of the Judiciary (Krajowa Rada Sądownictwa)
- changes to the electoral legislation, in order to make elections more free and fair
- powers of the Sejm were adjusted

The 1952 constitution would be even further reformed by the December Novelization and Small Constitution of 1992, and finally replaced in 1997 by a completely new current Constitution of Poland.
