= Constitution of the Polish People's Republic =

Supreme law of Poland (1952–1997)

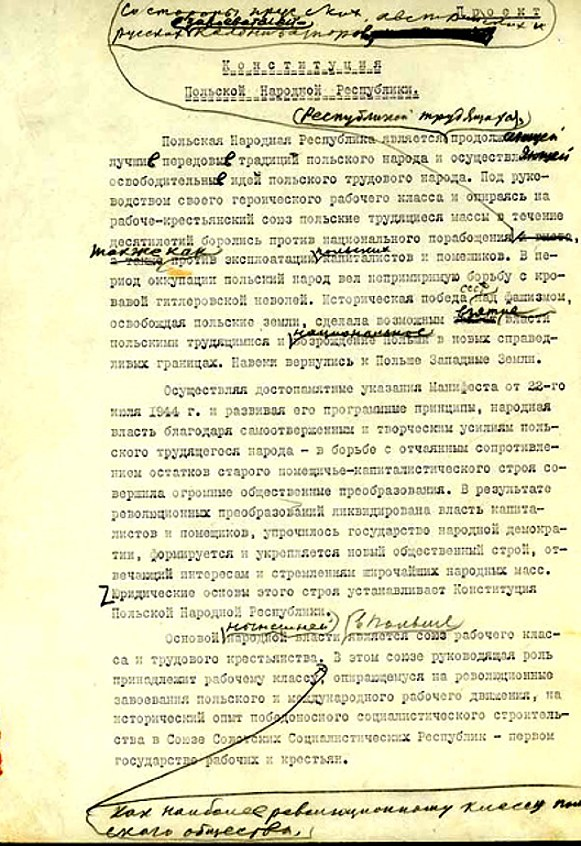
- Draft of the Polish constitution, with revisions and annotations hand-written by Joseph Stalin

Overview
- Jurisdiction: Poland
- Ratified: 22 July 1952
- Date effective: 22 July 1952
- System: Marxist–Leninist one-party socialist republic
- Head of state: Polish Council of State
- Chambers: Unicameral
- Federalism: Unitary
- Electoral college: No

History
- Amendments: 24
- Authors: Joseph Stalin, Bolesław Bierut
- Supersedes: Small Constitution of 1947

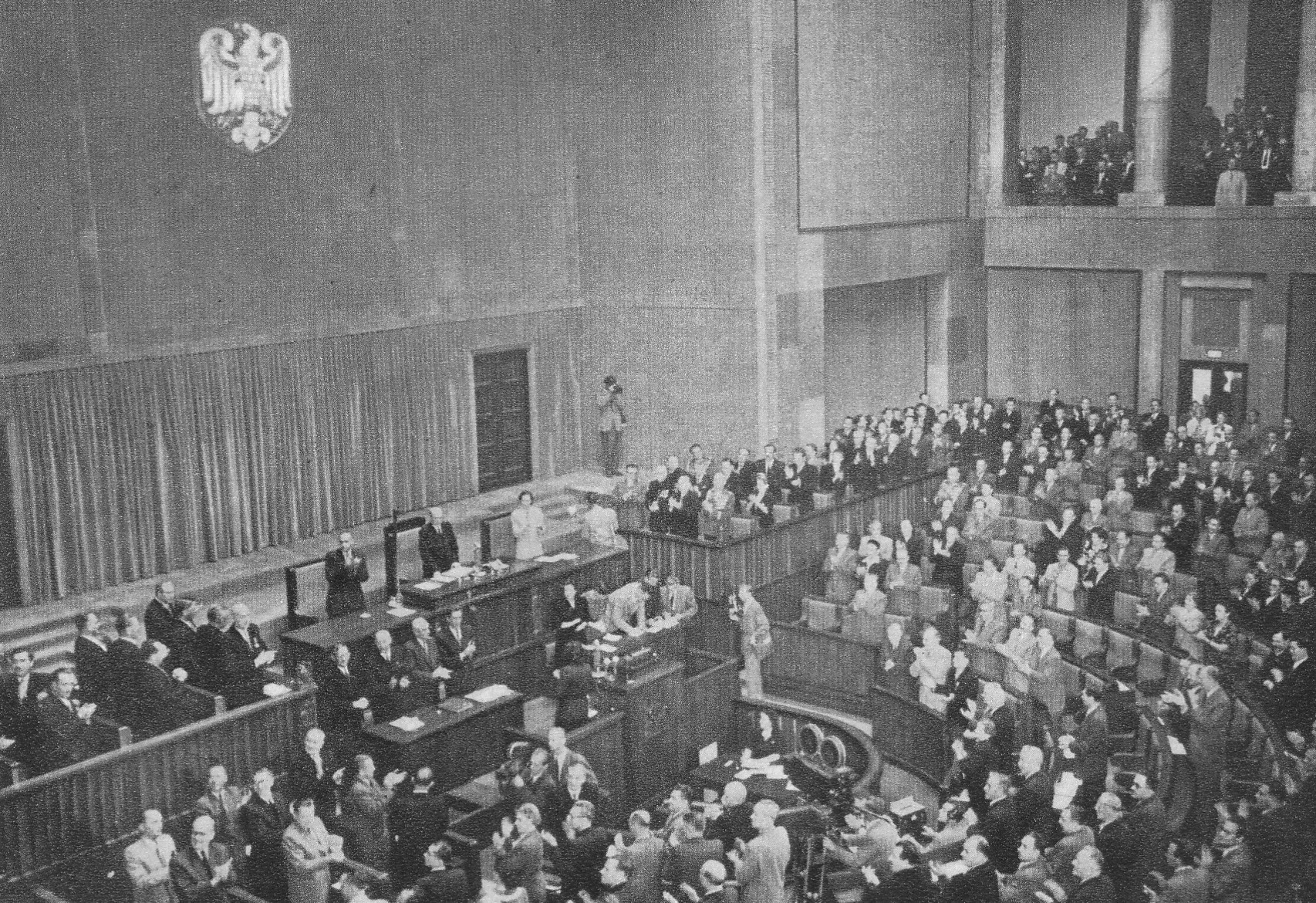
Adoption of the July Constitution by the Sejm

The Constitution of the Polish People's Republic (also known as the July Constitution or the Constitution of 1952) was a communist state constitution that acted as the supreme law. It passed in communist-ruled Poland on 22 July 1952. It superseded the post-World War II provisional Small Constitution of 1947, which in turn replaced the pre-war April Constitution of 1935.

The 1952 constitution introduced a new name for the Polish state, the Polish People's Republic (Polska Rzeczpospolita Ludowa, PRL), replacing the previously used Republic of Poland (Rzeczpospolita Polska). The communist-led Sejm (legislature) was declared to be the supreme state organ of power. The real source of supreme state power, the Polish United Workers' Party (PZPR), was not regulated by the constitution; it was ruled by its own statute. The constitution legalized many practices that had been introduced in Poland, in the wake of the Soviet Red Army and the Polish People's Army defeat of Nazi Germany in 1944–1945, by Polish-communist governmental bodies, including the Polish Committee of National Liberation (PKWN) and its successors.

Instead of the traditional separation of powers, the constitution introduced the Soviet concept of "unity of the state's power". While the ultimate power was reserved for the dictatorship of the proletariat, expressed as "the working people of towns and villages", the Sejm was granted on paper the paramount authority in government; it oversaw both the judicial and executive organs. However, the Sejm in practice exercised little or no real power. Under the constitution, the Polish Council of State replaced the office of the President of Poland as the head of state organ.

The constitution was amended twenty-four times, with the most contentious amendment being that of 10 February 1976. It was significantly amended during the change of system. Successive revisions in 1989 and 1992 pruned out the document's communist character. From 29 December 1989 the document was known as the Constitution of the Republic of Poland. It was superseded by a new Constitution of Poland on 17 October 1997.

== Legislative organ ==
In the 1946 Polish people's referendum the Senate of Poland had been abolished with the Sejm remaining the sole legislative body in Poland. Under the 1952 constitution, the Sejm officially became the "supreme organ of state power" under article 20.

The Sejm of the Polish People's Republic started with 425 members in 1952 (one deputy represented 60,000 citizens). However, as the population grew, the number of deputies increased. By 1960 the constitution was amended, dropping the calculation and stabilizing the Sejm at 460 deputies. A "proportional" attribute was dropped from the five-point electoral law previously used. An article in the constitution stated that deputies were responsible to the people and could be recalled by the people, although this article was never used.

Legislation was passed by majority vote. The Sejm voted on the budget and national plans as proposed by the executive. The Sejm deliberated in sessions, which were called by the Council of State elected by the Sejm from its members.

The Sejm also chose a Presidium from its members, with the Marshal of the Sejm always being a member of the United People's Party. During its first session the Sejm nominated the Prime Minister together with other ministers (the Council of Ministers), and members of the Council of State. Many other government officials were also chosen, including the head of the Supreme Audit Office (Najwyższa Izba Kotroli, NIK), members of the State Tribunal (Trybunał Stanu) and Constitutional Tribunal (Trybunał Konstytucyjny), as well as the Ombudsman (Rzecznik Praw Obywatelskich) (the latter three institutions were created in the 1980s).

In practice, like its counterparts in other communist regimes, the Sejm did little more than rubber-stamp decisions already made by the PZPR.

== Executive organ ==
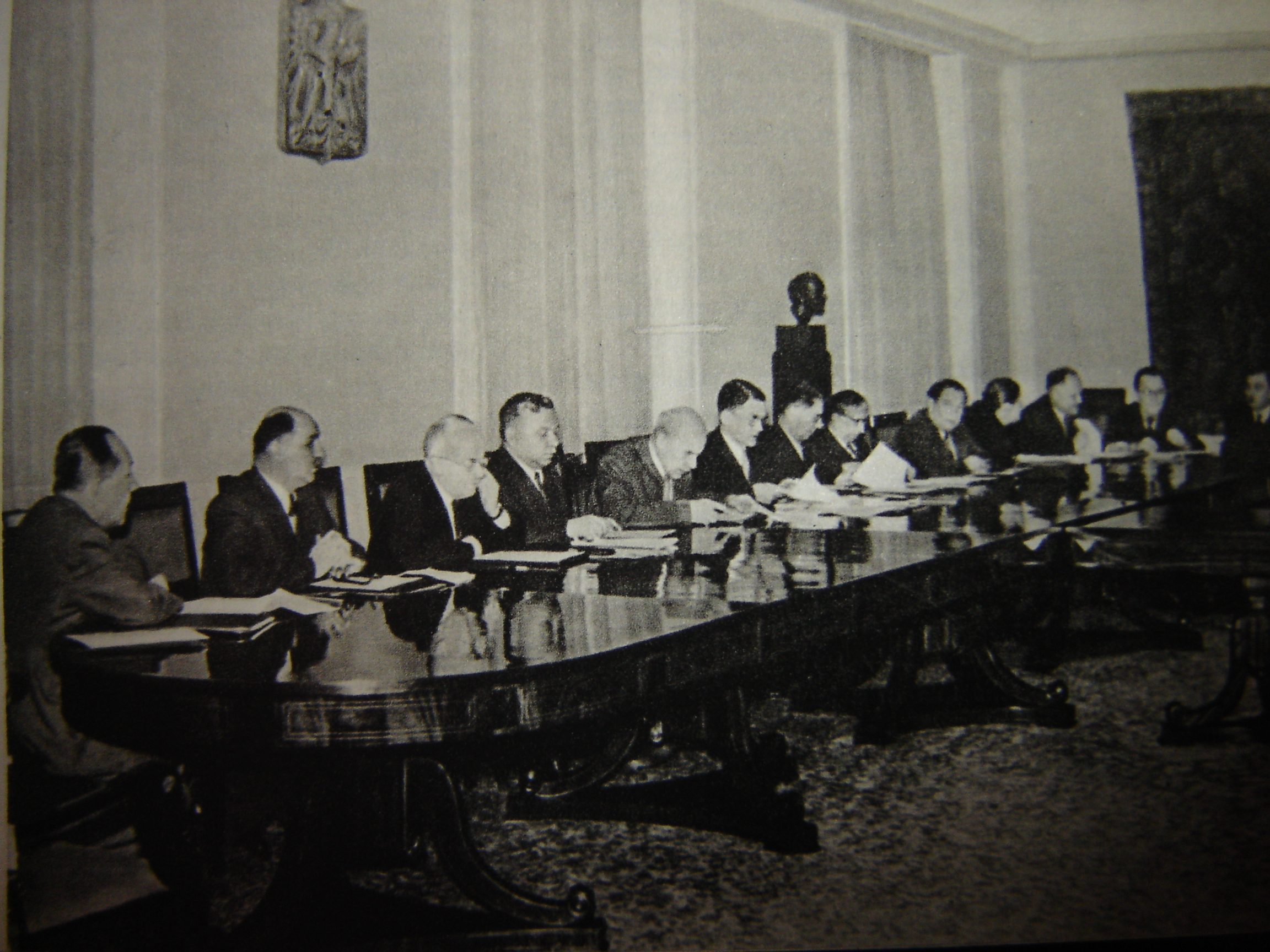
A meeting of the Polish Council of State during the 1960s

Executive power was held by the Council of Ministers and the Council of State. The Council of State replaced the previous Polish head of the state, the President of Poland (which terminated the presidency of Bolesław Bierut).

Article 29 provided that Council of State members were elected at the first session of the Sejm for the term of the Sejm (established at four years by Article 28). The council was composed of members of the Sejm; they were usually chosen from the dominant Polish United Workers' Party, although occasionally other deputies were chosen. The council acted as the head of state (in practice the body was represented by the Chairman of the Council of State). Article 30 of the constitution set out the authority of the Council of State, including representing the Polish People's Republic in foreign relations and in ratification of international treaties. The council also voted in matters related to the military. It granted citizenship and could invoke pardon. The council not only had legislative initiative under Article 25, but could issue administrative decrees under Article 31. However, those decrees had to be confirmed by the Sejm in its next session. The council also defined the interpretation of laws, which in many countries is reserved to the judiciary.

The Council of Ministers also had legislative initiative under Article 25. The composition of the Council of Ministers was set forth in Article 39. The Council of Ministers developed the state budget and socio-economic plans and presented them to the Sejm for approval. After approval the Council of Ministers oversaw the execution of the plans and the budget.

== Judiciary ==
The Supreme Court was the overseer of all other courts, which were divided into regional (voivodeship) and particular (administrative and military). In 1980, the Supreme Administrative Court was introduced. In 1982, the State Tribunal (which also existed in the Second Polish Republic), the Constitutional Tribunal, and the Ombudsman office were introduced.

== Amendments ==
During its forty-five years of service, the Constitution of the Polish People's Republic was subject to many changes, with its text amended 24 times.

The most controversial amendment was that of 10 February 1976. The proposed amendment declared that Poland was a socialist country, the PZPR was the leading force in the building of socialism and Poland shared "unshakable fraternal bonds" with the Soviet Union. The amendment caused protests resulting in the Letter of 59, asking for inclusion of human rights as stated in the Helsinki Accords. The government backed off somewhat, and the final amendment deleted the phrase "citizens' rights depend upon fulfillment of civic duties", changed "unshakable fraternal bonds" to "strengthening of friendship" and made other conciliatory changes, but after the revised amendment passed there were still protests from the Catholic Church and intellectuals.

The constitution was heavily amended during the period of political transformation of 1989-92. The amendments purged the document of its communist character and phrasing. Among the more important changes were:

- In April 1989, the April Novelization was passed, restoring the Senate of Poland and the office of President of Poland. Wojciech Jaruzelski, elected in 1989, became the first president of Poland since 1952.
- In December 1989, the Contract Sejm changed the official name of the country from the Polish People's Republic to the Republic of Poland and removed references to Poland being a socialist state.
- On 17 October 1992, much of the constitution was replaced by the Small Constitution of 1992.

== Synopsis ==
The chief role of the 1952 Constitution was to ratify and secure communist rule in Poland, however, it failed to regulate the main source of power – the communist party (PZPR). The constitution served as a propaganda tool, proclaiming the "Polish People's Republic", and in theory establishing many rights for its citizens. In the 1970s and 1980s, the provisions of the constitution enabled opposition activists to challenge the authorities and accuse them of not complying with the constitution.

== Sources ==
- Bierut, Bolesław (1956). O Konstytucji Polskiej Rzeczypospolitej Ludowej [About the Constitution of the Polish People's Republic]. Warsaw, Poland: Książka i Wiedza. OCLC 236235145.
- Rozmaryn, Stefan (1964). Ustawa w Polskiej Rzeczypospolitej Ludowej [Statutory law in the Polish People's Republic]. Warsaw, Poland: Państwowe Wydawnictwo Naukowe. OCLC 831357713.
- Wasilkowski, Jan, ed. (1954). Zagadnienia prawne Konstytucji Polskiej Rzeczypospolitej Ludowej: materialy sesji naukowej PAN, 4–9 lipca 1953 r. [Legal issues of the Constitution of the Polish People's Republic: materials from a scientific session of the Polish Academy of Sciences, 4–9 July 1953]. Warsaw, Poland: Państwowe Wydawnictwo Naukowe.
