= Chief of State (Poland) =

Polish head of state, 1918–1922

Chief of State of the Republic of Poland
- Naczelnik Państwa
- Official standard

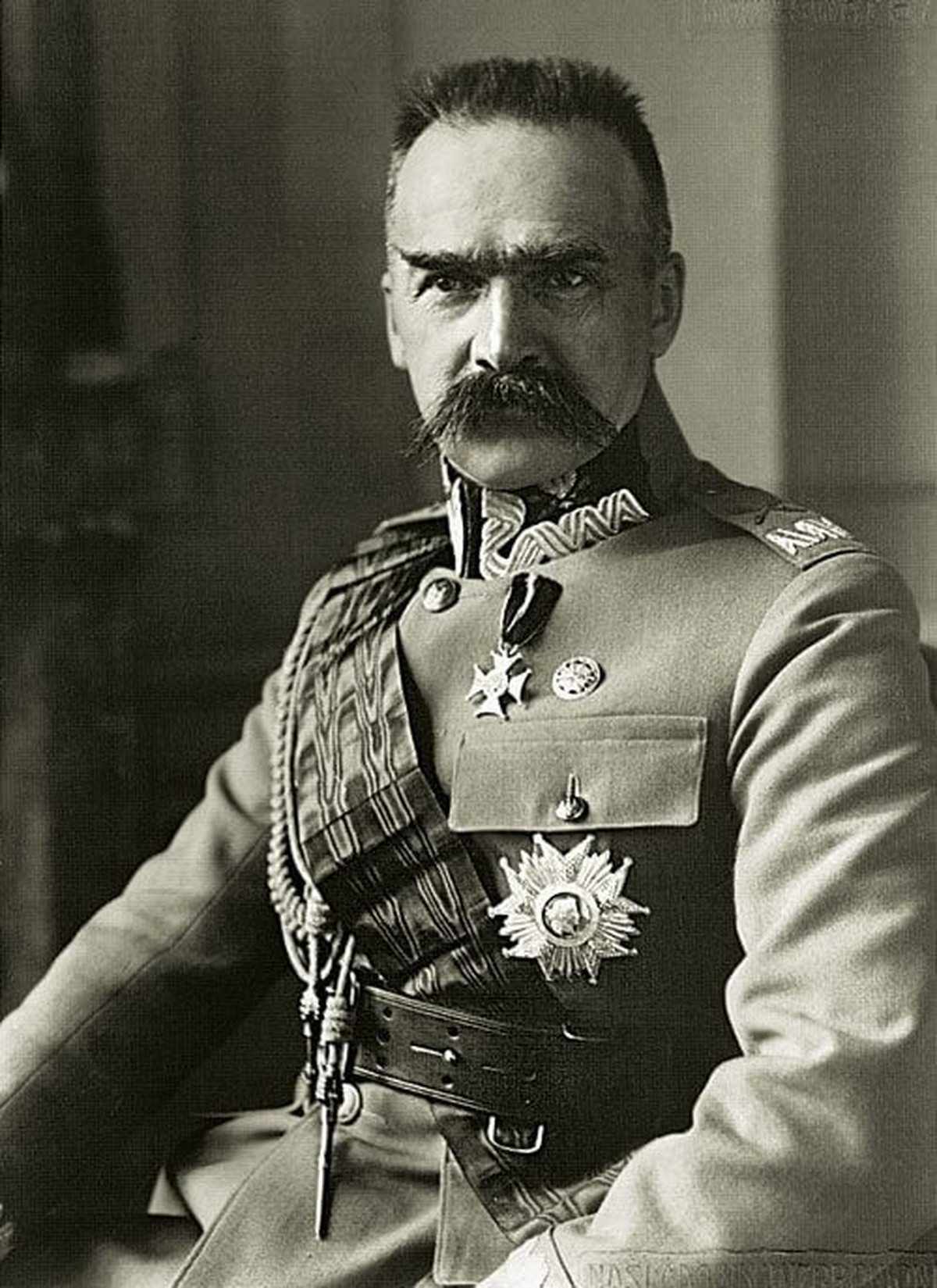
- Only officeholder Józef Piłsudski; 22 November 1918 – 14 December 1922
- Type: Head of state
- Residence: Belweder Palace; Royal Castle
- Constituting instrument: 1919 Constitution
- Precursor: Regency Council
- Formation: 22 November 1918; 107 years ago
- Abolished: 14 December 1922; 103 years ago
- Succession: President of Poland

The Chief of State (Polish: Naczelnik Państwa; Polish pronunciation: [naˈt͡ʂɛlɲik ˈpaj̃stfa]) was the title of the head of state of Poland in the early years of the Second Polish Republic. This office was held only by Józef Piłsudski, from 1918 to 1922. Until 1919, the title was called the Provisional Chief of State (Polish: Tymczasowy Naczelnik Państwa). After 1922, the Polish head of state became the President of Poland.

== History ==
The office of Chief of State was created by a Regency Council decree of 22 November 1918, which established a system of governance for Poland pending its revision by a democratically elected Sejm (parliament).

The Naczelnik exercised the highest civil and military power in the country. He was Commander-in-Chief of the Polish Army, with powerful prerogatives in the field of foreign relations. He appointed government ministers, who answered to him, including the Prime Minister. Provisional decrees could be promulgated by the Chief of State with the countersignatures of the Prime Minister and the relevant minister, though any such laws were to be reviewed by the first subsequent Sejm.

Józef Piłsudski, who was chosen as Chief of State, relinquished his powers to the first Sejm on February 20, 1919; however, the Sejm requested that he remain Chief of State, stating the powers of the office (now without the word "Provisional") in the Small Constitution of 1919. The Chief of State remained Commander-in-Chief of the Polish Army, named the government (subject to confirmation by the Sejm) and held the highest executive power. He was a member of the Council of National Defence (Rada Obrony Państwa), created during the Polish–Soviet War which had threatened the survival of the newly recreated Polish state.

Piłsudski relinquished his powers to the newly elected President of Poland, Gabriel Narutowicz, on 14 December 1922.
