= Small Constitution of 1947 =

Constitution issued by polish communist-dominated Sejm

The Small Constitution of 1947 (Polish: Mała Konstytucja z 1947) was a temporary constitution issued by the communist-dominated Sejm (Polish parliament) on 19 February 1947. It confirmed the practice of separation of powers and strengthened the Sejm. It was renewed in 1949, 1950, and 1951. It recognized some articles of the March Constitution of Poland (1921) and the Manifesto of the Polish Committee of National Liberation (1944), whereas the April Constitution of 1935 was not recognized. The Small Constitution was replaced in 1952 by the Constitution of the Polish People's Republic.
