= Manifesto of the Polish Committee of National Liberation =

Political manifesto of the Polish Committee of National Liberation

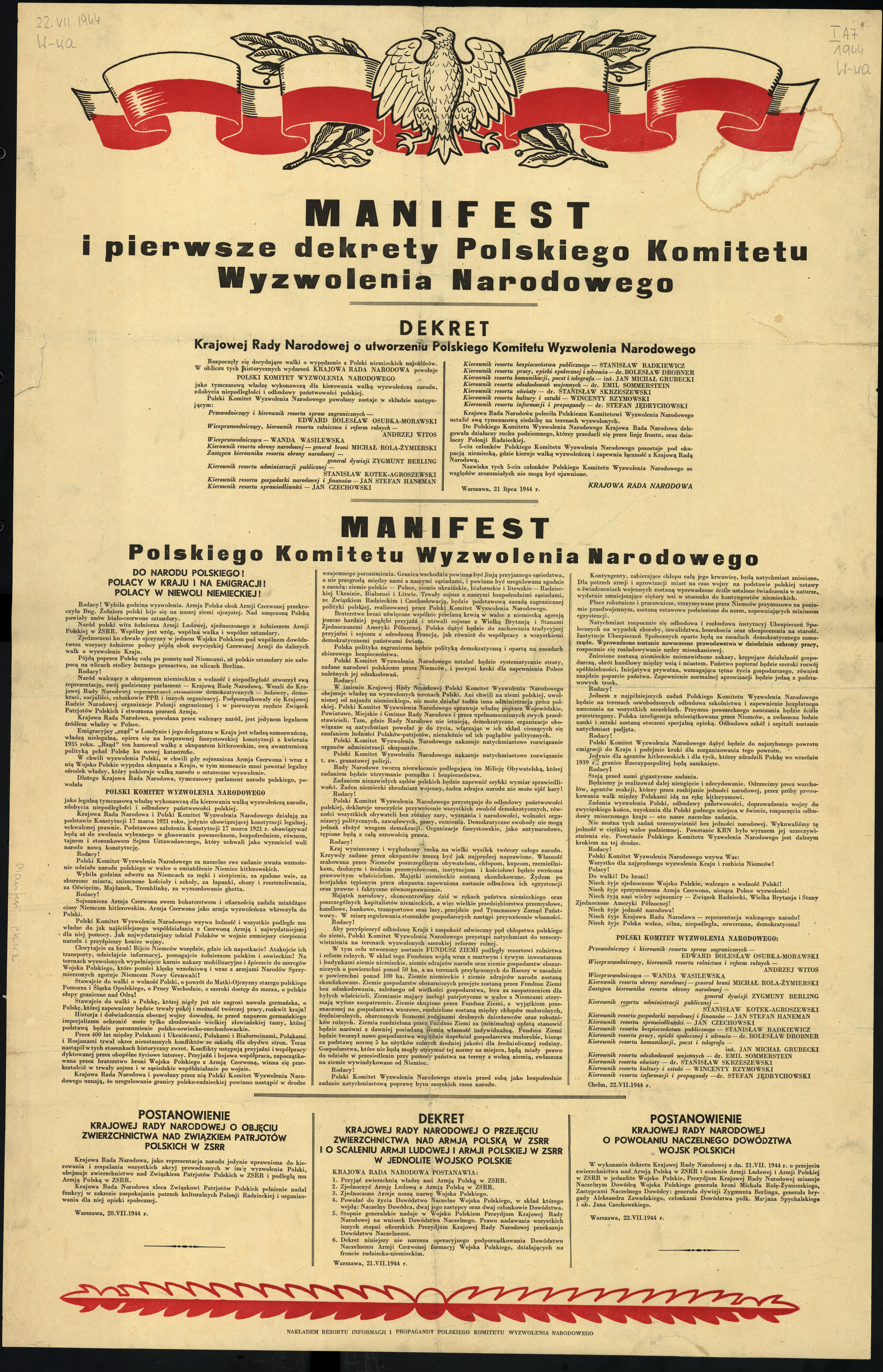
Photo of the PKWN Manifesto

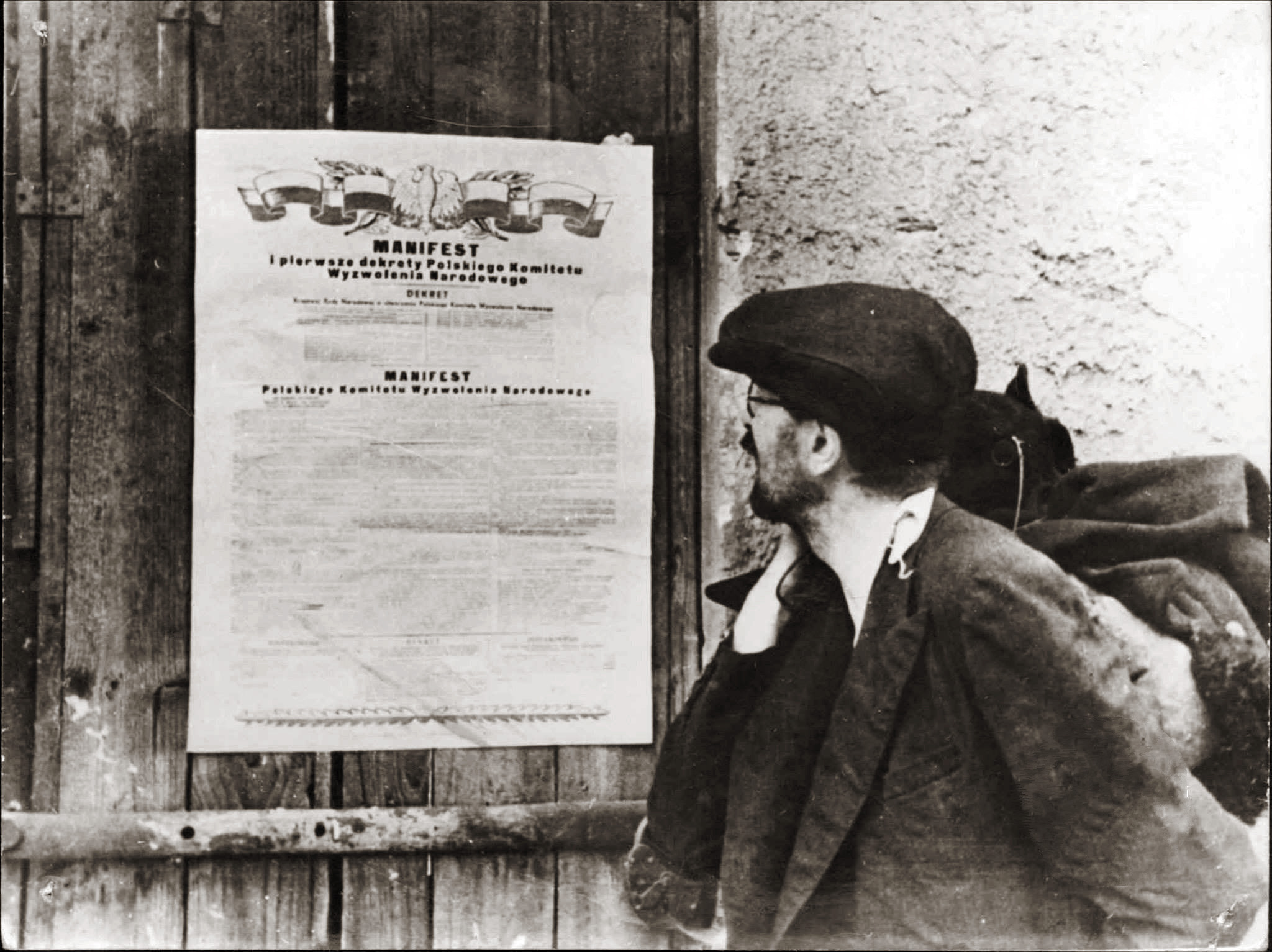
A propaganda photo of a citizen reading the PKWN Manifesto.

The Manifesto of the Polish Committee of National Liberation, also known as the July Manifesto (Polish: Manifest lipcowy) or the PKWN Manifesto (Manifest PKWN), was a political manifesto of the Polish Committee of National Liberation (PKWN), a Soviet-backed administration, which operated in opposition to the London-based Polish government in exile.

It was officially proclaimed in Chełm on 22 July 1944, and shortly after, its text was personally amended by Joseph Stalin in Moscow, before being printed there as well. Printing in Poland was staged for the media by the Soviets.

== Contents ==
The manifesto was addressed to the Polish nation at that time: individuals both within Nazi-occupied Poland, and those in exile abroad due to the ongoing World War II. It was arranged into thirteen main points. Among and within these points:

- It declares the legitimacy of the coming State National Council, a Soviet-backed administration composed of populists, democrats, socialists, communists and other organisations. It then denounces the London-based Polish government in exile, the one ousted by the Nazi-Soviet military takeover at the outbreak of World War II.
- It condemns the Polish Constitution of 1935 which was "unlawful" and "fascist" and claims the Constitution of 1921 is the only current legal constitution. The State National Council will operate on the 1921 Constitution, until a new one can be written by new Sejm legislators in future direct, popular, free, elections by secret ballot.
- It urges support of the Polish people for the People's Army and the Red Army, by capturing and turning in weapons, ammunition and supplies, and providing any intelligence or information, and doing their part in the fight against Germany.
- It acknowledges that for 400 years there has been sustained, mutually-detrimental conflict between Poles and the Ukrainians, Belarusians, and Russians, but their alliance, common cause and side-by-side fighting in the war should solidify a lasting strong, friendly, mutually-beneficial alliance between Poland and the Soviet Union.
- It calls for further fight for return to Poland of the Upper Silesia, East Prussia and Pomerania up to the border on the Oder river and for the wide access to the sea.
- It calls for negotiation of the Polish-Soviet and Polish-Czechoslovak borders to be reached by mutual agreement, where Polish land will belong to Poland, but Ukrainian, Belarusian and Lithuanian lands to respective Soviet republics.
- It calls for continued alliance with the United Kingdom and the United States, based on blood shed against a common enemy, and also maintaining Poland's traditional alliance with France and continued co-operation with the democratic countries of the world. It states that going forward, Polish government policy will be democratic and based on collective security.
- Reparations will be demanded from Germany for Polish losses.
- It claims for PKWN authority to extend to all liberated Polish territory, and asks Polish patriots in areas where the PKWN does not exercise authority to democratically elect members to participate in the PKWN.
- It calls for the creation of a new police force, the Citizen's Militia, as a solution to lack of order caused by the removal of the Polish Police of the General Government, the so-called Blue Police.
- It promises that German war criminals and Polish traitors will receive quick justice in independent courts.
- It offers promise of restoration of democratic freedoms, equality of all citizens without distinction of race, religion, or nationality, freedom of political organisations, unions, press and conscience. Fascist organisations will be repressed to fullest extent of the law.
- Property stolen by the Germans will be returned to individual citizens, institutions, and the church. German assets will be confiscated. National assets reclaimed from the German Reich and individual German capitalists will be put under the Interim National Management Board.
- To speed up national reconstruction, broad land reform will be enacted in liberated territories.
- Minimum wages will be raised, and a social security will be instituted, based on the principal of democratic self-government
- Free, universal, compulsory education, and the Polish intelligentsia will be rebuilt.
- Steps will be taken to encourage and organise immigration of Poles back to Poland, but the borders will be closed to National Socialist agents and organisers of the Invasion of Poland (1939).
- It places an appeal to national unity, without which it would be impossible to accomplish the monumental task of liberating Poland, winning the war, acquiring a dignified place for Poland among the nations of the world and rebuilding a destroyed country.
- It urges the Polish people to do everything possible to liberate the country and defeat the Germans.

The manifesto ends with a call to arms:

"To the fight! To arms!
Long live the united Polish Army, fighting for the freedom of Poland!
Long live the allied Red Army, carrying out the liberation of Poland!
Long live our great allies - the Soviet Union, Great Britain and the United States of America!
Long live national unity!
Long live the State National Council - the representation of the fighting people!
Long live free, strong, independent, sovereign and democratic Poland!"

== See also ==
- Soviet invasion of Poland
- History of Poland (1945–1989)
