= April Constitution of Poland =

2nd constitution of the Second Polish Republic, adopted in 1935

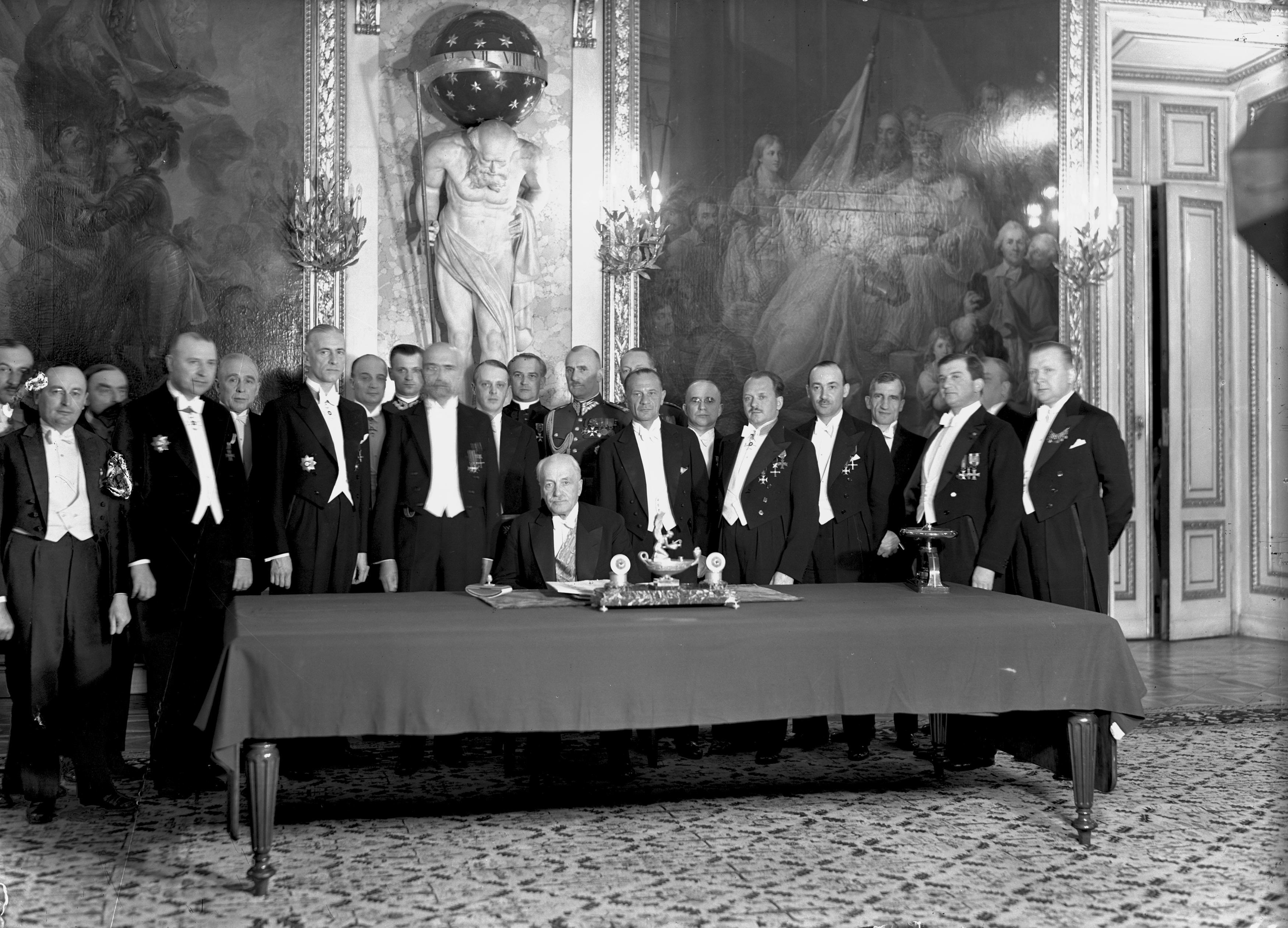

The April Constitution of Poland (Polish: Ustawa konstytucyjna 23 IV 1935 or Konstytucja kwietniowa) was the general law passed by the act of the Polish Sejm on 23 April 1935. It introduced in the Second Polish Republic an authoritarian presidential system that no longer operated on the basis of the functional separation of powers. The constitution was adopted in violation of the previous March Constitution of 1921 as well as the rules of procedure of parliament, which is why it was questioned by a significant part of the opposition to the Sanacja government.

== Summary ==
The act introduced the idea that the state is a common good of all the citizens. It also limited the powers of the Sejm and Senate while strengthening the authority of the President of Poland. The President concentrated "single and indivisible state power" in his hands, was responsible "only to God and history", and the government, parliament, armed forces, courts and control bodies were subordinated to him. The election of the President took place at a special Assembly of Electors, attended by 80 people, including five highest state officials, as well as 50 electors chosen from among members of the Sejm and 25 from ones of the Senate. The President had the right to propose his own candidate for the highest office. His term of office lasted seven years. The President appointed and dismissed the members of the government, which, in turn, was responsible both to him and to the parliament. He also had the right to dismiss the parliament before the end of term and named a third of the senators, the commander-in-chief of the Polish Army, and the General Inspector of the Armed Forces.

He also had the right to issue decrees and veto acts passed by the Sejm.

Among the most notable features of the new constitution was the president's right to name his successor in the case of war. That was used as the legal base for the existence of the Polish Government in Exile during and after World War II. The constitution was officially abolished on 22 July 1944 by the Polish Committee of National Liberation in their manifesto, which temporarily returned to the March Constitution prior to adopting the socialist constitution in 1952. The government-in-exile operated under the April Constitution until December 1990, when it transferred its authority to Lech Wałęsa after his election as Poland's first noncommunist president in 46 years.

== See also ==
- Electoral districts of Poland (1935–1939)
