= Small Constitution of 1992 =

The Small Constitution of 1992 (Polish: Mała Konstytucja z 1992) was a constitution regulating relations between the legislative and executive branches of the government of Poland, and local self-government. It was voted after the fall of communism, by Poland's first freely-elected Sejm (parliament).

It annulled some of the most outdated parts of the communist 1952 Constitution of the Polish People's Republic, in particular replacing statements about Poland being a socialist state with those appropriate for a liberal democracy and market economy.

The previous adjustment of the 1952 constitution was the April Novelization of 1989.

The reformed 1952 constitution was completely replaced in 1997 by the current Constitution of Poland.
