= Small Constitution of 1919 =

The Small Constitution of 1919 was the first constitution of the Second Polish Republic. It was formally called the "Legislative Sejm's ordinance of 20 February 1919, entrusting Józef Piłsudski with the further execution of the office of Chief of State" (Polish: "Uchwała Sejmu Ustawodawczego z dnia 20 lutego 1919 r. w sprawie powierzenia Józefowi Piłsudskiemu dalszego sprawowania urzędu Naczelnika Państwa"). The legislation was published as Dz. Pr. P.P. Nr 19, poz. 226.

== Provisions ==
The Small Constitution declared that Poland has a parliamentary system, although it did not define Poland as a republic.

Executive powers were held by the Chief of State. He could name the ministers (with the consent of the Sejm); he and the ministers were responsible before the Sejm. The Chief of State (previously the Provisional Chief of State) no longer had legislative initiative and could not dismiss the Sejm; all his acts required the signature of the relevant minister.

The Small Constitution was adopted and published on 20 February 1919 and went into effect a week later, on 27 February 1919. It was amended on 25 February 1920 and was supplanted on 1 June 1921 by the March 1921 Constitution.
