= List of national constitutions =

The following is a list of national constitutions by country, semi-recognized countries, and by codification.

== Codified constitutions (most recent, in use today) ==
A codified constitution is a constitution that is contained in a single document, which is the single source of constitutional law in a state. An uncodified constitution is one that is not contained in a single document, but consists of several different sources, which may be written or unwritten.

=== Sovereign states ===
==== UN member and observer states ====
| State | Date ratified | Word count |
|---|---|---|
| Constitution of Albania | November 28, 1998 | 13,826 |
| Constitution of Algeria | December 30, 2020 | —N/a |
| Constitution of Andorra | April 28, 1993 | 8,740 |
| Constitution of Angola | January 21, 2010 | 27,181 |
| Constitution of Antigua and Barbuda | October 31, 1981 | 38,464 |
| Constitution of Argentina | May 1, 1853 | 12,514 |
| Constitution of Armenia | July 5, 1995 | 13,786 |
| Constitution of Australia | January 1, 1901 | 17,318 |
| Constitution of Austria | October 1, 1920 | 41,366 |
| Constitution of Azerbaijan | November 12, 1995 | 17,354 |
| (The Bahamas) Constitution of the Bahamas | July 10, 1973 | 41,835 |
| Constitution of Bahrain | February 14, 2002 | 10,806 |
| Constitution of Bangladesh | November 4, 1972 | 27,643 |
| Constitution of Barbados | November 30, 1966 | 34,144 |
| Constitution of Belarus | March 15, 1994 | 13,278 |
| Constitution of Belgium | February 7, 1831 | 16,119 |
| Constitution of Belize | September 21, 1981 | 39,629 |
| Constitution of Benin | December 2, 1990 | 11,386 |
| Constitution of Bhutan | July 18, 2008 | 13,632 |
| Constitution of Bolivia | February 7, 2009 | 39,375 |
| Constitution of Bosnia and Herzegovina | December 14, 1995 | 5,454 |
| Constitution of Botswana | September 30, 1966 | 30,713 |
| Constitution of Brazil | October 5, 1988 | 64,488 |
| Constitution of Brunei | September 29, 1959 | 13,869 |
| Constitution of Bulgaria | July 12, 1991 | 13,641 |
| Constitution of Burkina Faso | June 11, 1991 | 10,030 |
| Constitution of Burundi | March 9, 1992 | 17,574 |
| Constitution of Cambodia | September 24, 1993 | 8,936 |
| Constitution of Cameroon | January 18, 1996 | 8,444 |
| Constitution of Cape Verde | September 5, 1980 | 32,132 |
| Constitution of the Central African Republic | March 27, 2016 | 9,767 |
| Constitution of Chad | March 31, 1996 | 11,768 |
| Constitution of Chile | September 11, 1980 | 25,821 |
| Constitution of China | December 4, 1982 | 10,960 |
| Constitution of Colombia | July 4, 1991 | 46,902 |
| Constitution of the Comoros | December 23, 2001 | 6,185 |
| Constitution of the Republic of the Congo | October 25, 2015 | 9,970 |
| Constitution of the Democratic Republic of the Congo | February 18, 2006 | 19,285 |
| Constitution of Costa Rica | November 7, 1949 | 16,705 |
| Constitution of Croatia | December 22, 1990 | 10,898 |
| Constitution of Cuba | April 10, 2019 | 12,893 |
| Constitution of Cyprus | August 16, 1960 | 37,006 |
| Constitution of the Czech Republic | December 16, 1992 | 14,580 |
| Constitution of Denmark | May 25, 1849 | 6,221 |
| Constitution of Djibouti | September 15, 1992 | 6,666 |
| Constitution of Dominica | November 3, 1978 | 36,080 |
| Constitution of the Dominican Republic | January 26, 2010 | 29,710 |
| Constitution of Ecuador | October 20, 2008 | 54,555 |
| Constitution of Egypt | January 18, 2014 | 22,626 |
| Constitution of El Salvador | December 20, 1983 | 22,823 |
| Constitution of Equatorial Guinea | November 17, 1991 | 5,575 |
| Constitution of Eritrea | May 23, 1997 | 6,753 |
| Constitution of Estonia | June 28, 1992 | 11,344 |
| Constitution of Eswatini | July 26, 2005 | 48,604 |
| Constitution of Ethiopia | August 21, 1995 | 13,630 |
| Constitution of Fiji | September 6, 2013 | 40,773 |
| Constitution of Finland | March 1, 2000 | 12,640 |
| Constitution of France | October 4, 1958 | 10,180 |
| Constitution of Gabon | November 16, 2024 | 11,804 |
| (The Gambia) Constitution of the Gambia | January 16, 1997 | 43,465 |
| (Georgia (country)) Constitution of Georgia | August 24, 1995 | 11,490 |
| Basic Law for the Federal Republic of Germany | May 8, 1949 | 27,379 |
| Constitution of Ghana | April 28, 1992 | 53,985 |
| Constitution of Greece | June 11, 1975 | 26,989 |
| Constitution of Grenada | December 19, 1973 | 33,737 |
| Constitution of Guatemala | January 14, 1986 | 28,692 |
| Constitution of Guinea | May 7, 2010 | 12,707 |
| Constitution of Guinea-Bissau | May 6, 1984 | 7,820 |
| Constitution of Guyana | October 6, 1980 | 46,221 |
| Constitution of Haiti | June 20, 2012 | 18,488 |
| Constitution of Honduras | January 20, 1982 | 23,434 |
| Fundamental Law of Hungary | April 18, 2011 | 15,247 |
| Constitution of Iceland | June 17, 1944 | 4,089 |
| Constitution of India | November 26, 1949 | 146,385 |
| Constitution of Indonesia | August 18, 1945 | 5,915 |
| Constitution of Iran | December 3, 1979 | 16,179 |
| Constitution of Iraq | October 15, 2005 | 11,550 |
| (Republic of Ireland) Constitution of Ireland | December 29, 1937 | 16,007 |
| Constitution of Italy | December 22, 1947 | 11,708 |
| Constitution of Ivory Coast | November 8, 2016 | 7,897 |
| Constitution of Jamaica | January 1, 1962 | 38,048 |
| Constitution of Japan | May 3, 1947 | 4,998 |
| Constitution of Jordan | January 11, 1952 | 10,239 |
| Constitution of Kazakhstan | July 1, 2026 | 13,482 |
| Constitution of Kenya | August 27, 2010 | 48,818 |
| Constitution of Kiribati | July 12, 1979 | 26,080 |
| Constitution of North Korea | December 25, 1972 | 7,364 |
| Constitution of South Korea | July 17, 1948 | 9,059 |
| Constitution of Kuwait | November 11, 1962 | 8,197 |
| Constitution of Kyrgyzstan | June 27, 2010 | 14,327 |
| Constitution of Laos | August 14, 1991 | 4,820 |
| Constitution of Latvia | November 7, 1922 | 4,917 |
| Constitution of Lebanon | May 23, 1926 | 6,296 |
| Constitution of Lesotho | April 2, 1993 | 45,532 |
| Constitution of Liberia | January 6, 1986 | 11,667 |
| Constitution of Liechtenstein | October 5, 1921 | 9,513 |
| Constitution of Lithuania | October 25, 1992 | 12,214 |
| Constitution of Luxembourg | October 17, 1868 | 5,601 |
| (Libya) Libyan interim Constitutional Declaration | August 3, 2011 | —N/a |
| Constitution of Malawi | May 16, 1994 | 33,422 |
| Constitution of Malaysia | August 27, 1957 | 64,080 |
| Constitution of the Maldives | August 7, 2008 | 23,991 |
| Constitution of Mali | January 12, 1992 | 7,503 |
| Constitution of Malta | September 21, 1964 | 31,820 |
| Constitution of the Marshall Islands | March 1, 1979 | 21,429 |
| Constitution of Mauritania | July 12, 1991 | 6,997 |
| Constitution of Mauritius | March 12, 1968 | 37,320 |
| Constitution of Mexico | February 5, 1917 | 57,087 |
| Constitution of the Federated States of Micronesia | October 1, 1978 | 5,271 |
| Constitution of Moldova | July 29, 1994 | 12,818 |
| Constitution of Monaco | December 17, 1962 | 3,814 |
| Constitution of Mongolia | January 13, 1992 | 8,250 |
| Constitution of Montenegro | October 19, 2007 | 11,572 |
| Constitution of Morocco | December 14, 1962 | 15,897 |
| Constitution of Mozambique | December 21, 2004 | 24,171 |
| Constitution of Myanmar | May 29, 2008 | 40,492 |
| Constitution of Namibia | February 9, 1990 | 24,198 |
| Constitution of Nauru | January 31, 1968 | 13,714 |
| Constitution of Nepal | September 20, 2015 | 32,753 |
| Constitution of the Netherlands | August 24, 1815 (Note: almost entirely rewritten in 1983) | 8,739 |
| Constitution of Nicaragua | January 1, 1987 | 20,535 |
| Constitution of Niger | November 25, 2010 | 14,806 |
| Constitution of Nigeria | May 29, 1999 | 66,263 |
| Constitution of North Macedonia | November 17, 1991 | 13,486 |
| Constitution of Norway | May 17, 1814 | 7,307 |
| Basic Statute of Oman | November 6, 1996 | 7,233 |
| Constitution of Pakistan | August 14, 1973 | 56,240 |
| Constitution of Palau | July 9, 1980 | —N/a |
| (Palestine) Palestinian National Covenant | May 28, 1964 | —N/a |
| Constitution of Panama | October 11, 1972 | 26,097 |
| Law of Papua New Guinea | September 16, 1975 | 58,490 |
| Constitution of Paraguay | June 20, 1992 | 25,461 |
| Constitution of Peru | December 31, 1993 | 19,216 |
| Constitution of the Philippines | February 2, 1987 | 21,954 |
| Constitution of Poland | April 2, 1997 | 19,602 |
| Constitution of Portugal | April 25, 1976 | 35,219 |
| Constitution of Qatar | April 9, 2004 | 6,848 |
| Constitution of Romania | November 21, 1991 | 14,663 |
| Constitution of Russia | December 12, 1993 | 12,908 |
| Constitution of Rwanda | May 26, 2003 | 16,940 |
| (Saint Kitts and Nevis) Constitution of Saint Kitts and Nevis | June 23, 1983 | 49,643 |
| Constitution of Saint Lucia | December 20, 1978 | 38,271 |
| Constitution of Saint Vincent and the Grenadines | July 26, 1979 | —N/a |
| Constitution of Samoa | October 28, 1960 | 19,611 |
| Constitution of São Tomé and Príncipe | November 5, 1975 | 7,988 |
| Basic Law of Saudi Arabia | March 1, 1992 | 6,335 |
| Constitution of Senegal | January 1, 2001 | 10,866 |
| Constitution of Serbia | November 8, 2006 | 19,891 |
| Constitution of Seychelles | June 18, 1993 | 39,729 |
| Constitution of Sierra Leone | March 29, 1996 | 44,636 |
| Constitution of Singapore | August 9, 1965 | 40,076 |
| Constitution of Slovakia | October 1, 1992 | 18,402 |
| Constitution of Slovenia | December 23, 1991 | 11,406 |
| Constitution of Solomon Islands | May 31, 1978 | 31,826 |
| Constitution of Somalia | August 1, 2012 | 19,823 |
| Constitution of South Africa | February 4, 1997 | 43,062 |
| Constitution of South Sudan | July 9, 2011 | 27,191 |
| Constitution of Spain | December 6, 1978 | 17,608 |
| Constitution of Sri Lanka | September 7, 1978 | 40,085 |
| Constitution of Sudan | August 4, 2019 | —N/a |
| Constitution of Suriname | September 30, 1987 | 12,488 |
| (Switzerland) Swiss Federal Constitution | April 18, 1999 | 16,484 |
| (Syria) Constitutional Declaration of the Syrian Arab Republic | March 13, 2025 | 6,800 |
| Constitution of Tajikistan | November 6, 1994 | 7,917 |
| Constitution of Tanzania | April 25, 1977 | 35,651 |
| Constitution of Thailand | April 6, 2017 | 7,683 |
| Constitution of Timor-Leste | May 20, 2002 | 15,307 |
| Constitution of Togo | May 6, 2024 | 10,252 |
| Constitution of Tonga | November 4, 1875 | 10,192 |
| Constitution of Trinidad and Tobago | March 29, 1976 | 32,567 |
| Constitution of Tunisia | January 26, 2014 | 9,508 |
| Constitution of Turkey | November 7, 1982 | 29,727 |
| Constitution of Turkmenistan | May 18, 1992 | 5,735 |
| Constitution of Tuvalu | October 1, 2023 | 34,801 |
| Constitution of Uganda | October 8, 1995 | 49,448 |
| Constitution of Ukraine | June 28, 1996 | 19,299 |
| Constitution of the United States | June 21, 1788 | 7,762 |
| Constitution of the United Arab Emirates | December 2, 1971 | 11,557 |
| Constitution of Uruguay | July 18, 1830 | 29,911 |
| Constitution of Uzbekistan | December 8, 1992 | 7,941 |
| Fundamental Law of Vatican City State | November 26, 2000 | —N/a |
| Constitution of Vanuatu | July 30, 1980 | 8,425 |
| Constitution of Venezuela | December 20, 1999 | 37,344 |
| Constitution of Vietnam | November 28, 2013 | 11,344 |
| Constitution of Yemen | May 16, 1991 | —N/a |
| Constitution of Zambia | January 5, 2016 | 30,696 |
| Constitution of Zimbabwe | May 9, 2013 | 55,883 |

==== Other states ====
| Country | Date |
|---|---|
| Constitution of Abkhazia | October 3, 1999 |
| (Taiwan) Constitution of the Republic of China | December 25, 1947 |
| Constitution of the Cook Islands | August 4, 1965 |
| Constitution of Kosovo | June 15, 2008 |
| Niue Constitution Act | October 19, 1974 |
| Constitution of Northern Cyprus | May 5, 1985 |
| Constitution of the Sahrawi Arab Democratic Republic | August 1976 |
| Constitution of Somaliland | May 31, 2001 |
| Constitution of South Ossetia | April 8, 2001 |
| Constitution of Transnistria | January 17, 1996 |

=== Dependent territories ===
| Territory | Date |
|---|---|
| Constitution of American Samoa | October 17, 1960 |
Law of Anguilla
| Constitution of Aruba | January 1, 1986 |
Law of Bermuda
| Constitution of the British Virgin Islands | June 15, 2007 |
| Christmas Island | |
Cocos (Keeling) Islands
| Constitution of Curaçao | October 10, 2010 |
| Constitution of the Falkland Islands | January 1, 2009 |
| Constitution of Gibraltar | January 2, 2007 |
| Guam Organic Act of 1950 | |
| Hong Kong Basic Law | April 4, 1990 |
| Law of the Isle of Man | |
| (Macau) Macao Basic Law | March 31, 1993 |
| Northern Mariana Islands Commonwealth Constitution | January 1, 1978 |
| Constitution of Puerto Rico | July 25, 1952 |
| Constitution of Sint Maarten | October 10, 2010 |
| Constitution of the Turks and Caicos Islands | October 15, 2012 |
Constitution of the United States Virgin Islands

== Uncodified constitutions ==
An uncodified constitution is one where not all elements are written, typically with strong reliance on oral constitutional convention. A constitution that relies more upon oral convention than written documents is called an oral constitution. Many oral conventions are codified in statutes or regulations, or documented in court decisions, making them undoubtedly enforceable. All constitutions rely to some degree upon oral convention and interpretation because it is not possible to reduce everything to writing. Dates have been listed below are for fundamental founding documents on governance of the respective countries.

- Constitution of Canada (a series of 25 documents dating from 1867 to 1982; constitutional amendments proposed after 1982 were rejected by the provinces)
- Basic Laws of Israel (1950)
- Constitution of New Zealand (1840, 1979–2016)
- Constitution of San Marino (1600, 1974)
- Basic Laws of Sweden (1810, 1974)
- Constitution of the United Kingdom (England: 1215, 1688); (Scotland:1689); Great Britain: 1706; United Kingdom: 1800, 1921)

== Sovereign states without a constitution ==
- Afghanistan has not had a constitution since the Taliban took power in 2021.
- Madagascar's constitution has been suspended since the 2025 coup. A new constitutional document is planned for 2027.

== Former constitutions ==
Afghanistan

- Constitution of the Kingdom of Afghanistan (1964)
- Constitution of the Islamic Republic of Afghanistan (2004)

Brazil

- Constitution of the Empire of Brazil (1824)
- Constitution of the Republic of the United States of Brazil (1891)
- Constitution of the Republic of the United States of Brazil (1934)
- Brazilian Constitution of 1937
- Brazilian Constitution of 1946
- Brazilian Constitution of 1967

Bulgaria

- Constitution of the Principality of Bulgaria (1879)
- Constitution of the People’s Republic of Bulgaria (1947)
- Constitution of the People’s Republic of Bulgaria (1971)

Costa Rica

- Pact of Concord
- First Political Statute of the Province of Costa Rica
- Second Political Statute of the Province of Costa Rica
- Fundamental Law of the State of Costa Rica
- Decree of Basis and Guarantees
- Costa Rican Constitution of 1844
- Costa Rican Constitution of 1847
- Costa Rican Constitution of 1859
- Costa Rican Constitution of 1869
- Costa Rican Constitution of 1871
- Costa Rican Constitution of 1917

China

- Constitution of the Qing Empire 1908
- Constitution of the Republic of China (1912)
- Constitution of the Republic of China (1947) — Suspended 1948, amended 1991
  - Temporary Provisions against the Communist Rebellion
- Common Program (1949)
- Constitution of the People's Republic of China (1954)
- Constitution of the People's Republic of China (1975)
- Constitution of the People's Republic of China (1978)

Colombia

- Act of the Extraordinary Council of Santa Fe de Bogotá (1810)
- Constitution of the Free and Independent State of Cundinamarca (1811)
- Act of Federation of the United Provinces of New Granada (1811)
- Constitution of the Republic of Colombia (1821)
- Constitution of the Republic of Colombia (1830)
- Constitution of the Republic of New Granada (1832)
- Constitution of the Republic of New Granada (1843)
- Constitution of the Republic of New Granada (1853)
- Constitution of the Granadine Confederation (1858)
- Constitution of the United States of Colombia (1863)
- Constitution of the Republic of Colombia (1886)

Cuba

- Constitution of Cuba (1901)
- Constitution of Cuba (1940)
- Constitution of Cuba (1976)

Czechoslovakia

- Constitution of Czechoslovakia (1920)
- Constitution of Czechoslovakia (1948)
- Constitution of Czechoslovakia (1960)
- Constitution of Czechoslovakia (1968)

Denmark

- King's Law

Ecuador

- 1830 Constitution of Ecuador

Egypt

- Constitution of Egypt (1879) (abortive)
- Fundamental Ordinance (1882)
- Constitution of Egypt (1923)
- Constitution of Egypt (1930)
- Provisional constitution of 1953
- Constitution of Egypt (1956)
- Provisional Constitution of the United Arab Republic (1958)
- Constitutional Proclamation (1962)
- Constitution of United Arab Republic (1964)
- Constitution of the Arab Republic of Egypt (1971)
- Provisional Constitution of the Arab Republic of Egypt (2011)
- Constitution of Egypt (2012)

Ethiopia

- 1931 Constitution of Ethiopia
- 1955 Constitution of Ethiopia
- 1987 Constitution of Ethiopia

France

- Constitution of the Kingdom of France (1791)
- Constitution of the First French Republic (1793)
- Constitution of the First French Republic (1795)
- Constitution of the First French Republic (1799)
- Constitution of the First French Republic (1801)
- Constitution of the First French Empire (1804)
- Constitution of the Kingdom of France (1814)
- Constitution of the First French Empire (1815)
- Constitution of the Kingdom of France (1830)
- Constitution of the Second French Republic
- Constitution of the Second French Empire
- Constitution of the Third French Republic
- Constitution of the French State (Vichy Regime)
- Constitution of the Fourth French Republic

Germany

- Constitution of the German Confederation (1815)
  - Constitution of Prussia (1848)
- Frankfurt Constitution (1849)
  - Constitution of Prussia (1850)
- North German Constitution (1867)
- Constitution of the German Confederation (1871)
- Constitution of the German Empire (1871)
- Weimar Constitution (1919)
  - Constitution of Prussia (1920)
  - Reichstag Fire Decree (1933)
  - Enabling Act (1933)
- First Constitution of East Germany (1949)
- Second Constitution of East Germany (1968)

Greece

- Greek Constitution of 1822
- Greek Constitution of 1823
- Greek Constitution of 1827
- Greek Constitution of 1844
- Greek Constitution of 1864
- Greek Constitution of 1911
- Greek Constitution of 1927
- Greek Constitution of 1952
- Greek Constitution of 1968
- Greek Constitution of 1973

Hawaii

- Constitution of the Kingdom of Hawaii (1840)
- Constitution of the Kingdom of Hawaii (1852)
- Constitution of the Kingdom of Hawaii (1864)
- Constitution of the Kingdom of Hawaii (1887)
- Constitution of the Republic of Hawaii

India

- Government of India Act 1919
- Government of India Act 1935

Indonesia

- Federal Constitution of 1949
- Provisional Constitution of 1950

Iran

- Persian Constitution of 1906

Italy

- Corsican Constitution
- Constitution of the Cisalpine Republic (1797)
- Constitution of the Cisalpine Republic (1798)
- Constitution of the Cisalpine Republic (1801)
- Constitution of the Napoleonic Italian Republic
- Constitution of the Napoleonic Italian Kingdom
- Statuto Albertino

Mexico

- Constitution of Apatzingán (Proposed 1814)
- Federal Constitution of the United Mexican States (1824)
- Seven Constitutional Laws (Siete Leyes; 1836)
- Organic Bases of the Mexican Republic (1843)
- Federal Constitution of the United Mexican States (1857)

Pakistan

- Constitution of Pakistan of 1956
- Constitution of Pakistan of 1962

Philippines

- Constitution of the First Philippine Republic (1899)
- Constitution of the Philippine Commonwealth (1935) and the Third Philippine Republic
- Constitution of the Marcos-sponsored Fourth Philippine Republic (1973)

Poland

- Constitution of 3 May (1791)
- Constitution of the Duchy of Warsaw (1807)
- Constitution of the Kingdom of Poland (1815)
- Organic Statute of the Kingdom of Poland (1832)
- Small Constitution (1919)
- March Constitution (1921)
- April Constitution (1935)
- Small Constitution (1947)
- July Constitution (1952)
- Small Constitution (1992)

Portugal

- Portuguese Constitution of 1822
- Portuguese Constitution of 1826
- Portuguese Constitution of 1838
- Portuguese Constitution of 1911
- Portuguese Constitution of 1933

Russia

- Constitution of the Russian Empire
- Constitution of the Russian Republic
- Constitution of the Russian Soviet Federative Socialist Republic (1918)
- Constitution of the Russian Soviet Federative Socialist Republic (1978)
- Constitution of the Soviet Union (1924)
- Constitution of the Soviet Union (1936)
- Constitution of the Soviet Union (1977)

Syria

- Syrian Constitution of 1930
- 1973 Constitution of Ba'athist Syria
- 2012 Constitution of Ba'athist Syria

South Africa

- South Africa Act 1909
- South African Constitution of 1961
- South African Constitution of 1983
- Interim Constitution (1993)

Turkey

- Constitution of Turkey (1921)
- Constitution of Turkey (1924)
- Constitution of Turkey (1961)

Ukraine

- Constitution of Pylyp Orlyk (1710)
- Constitution of the Ukrainian People's Republic (1918)

United States

- Articles of Confederation (1781)

Yugoslavia

- Constitution of the Kingdom of Yugoslavia (1921)
- Constitution of the Kingdom of Yugoslavia (1931)
- Constitution of Yugoslavia (1946)
- Constitution of Yugoslavia (1963)
- Constitution of Yugoslavia (1974)
- Constitution of Yugoslavia (1992)
  - Constitutional Charter of Serbia and Montenegro

Other States

- Constitution of Artsakh
- Constitution of the Irish Free State
- Constitution of Japan (1889)
- Constitution of Poland-Lithuania (1791)
- Constitution of the Kingdom of Poland
- Constitution of the Principality of Serbia (1835)
- Constitution of the Confederate States
- Ottoman constitution of 1876
- Constitution of Vermont Republic
- Constitution of the Republic of Texas
- Malolos Constitution
- Constitution of the Mali Empire (1235)

== See also ==
- Constitution Day
- Constitutional documents
- Constitutional law
- List of U.S. state constitutions
