= List of non-communist socialist states =

List of self-declared socialist states

This is a list of non-communist states that self-identify as socialist states. That means this list includes African socialist states, Arab socialist states, Ba'athist states, and other unique socialist state formations.

== Socialist states ==
=== Current ===
| Country | Full name | From | Until | Duration | Constitutional statement |
|---|---|---|---|---|---|
| Sahrawi Arab Democratic Republic | Sahrawi Arab Democratic Republic | 27 February 1976 | – | 50 years, 202 days | The SADR is a partially recognized state but does not control all of Western Sahara which mostly remains under Moroccan occupation. The original constitution mentioned "realization of socialism" as its goal which was removed from the 1991 constitution but it remains a one-party state under the Arab socialist Polisario Front. |
| Eritrea | State of Eritrea | 24 May 1991 | – | 35 years, 116 days | The socialist People's Front for Democracy and Justice is the sole legal political party in Eritrea. PFDJ was originally Maoist and is still described as "ontologically Marxist". |
| Nicaragua | Republic of Nicaragua | 18 July 1979 (Note: The first officially Socialist constitution was adopted on 1 January 1987 (39 years, 259 days ago) but the references to socialism in the constitution were removed between 1 February 1995 and 29 January 2014, before being re-added in 2014 and expanded in 2025.)/30 January 2025 | – | 47 years, 61 days/1 year, 230 days | Since a 2025 constitutional amendment, Nicaragua has defined itself as a revolutionary socialist state based on Christian values, socialist ideals, and solidarity. |

=== Former ===
| Country | Full name | From | Until | Duration | Constitutional statement |
|---|---|---|---|---|---|
| Algeria | People's Democratic Republic of Algeria | 10 September 1963 | 23 February 1989 | 25 years, 166 days | Preamble: "The harmonious and efficient functioning of the political institutions provided for by the Constitution is ensured by the National Liberation Front which: Mobilizes, supervises and educates the popular masses for the achievement of socialism;" The National Liberation Front is a political party based on Arab socialism. |
| /Burma | Union of Burma | 2 March 1962 | 3 January 1974 | 11 years, 307 days | Chapter XVI General Provisions: "In order to overcome this deterioration and to build Socialism, the Revolutionary Council of the Union of Burma assumed responsibility as a historical mission, adopted the Burmese Way to Socialism and also formed the Burma Socialist Programme Party". |
| /Burma | Socialist Republic of the Union of Burma | 3 January 1974 | 18 September 1988 | 14 years, 259 days | Chapter XVI General Provisions: "In order to overcome this deterioration and to build Socialism, the Revolutionary Council of the Union of Burma assumed responsibility as a historical mission, adopted the Burmese Way to Socialism and also formed the Burma Socialist Programme Party". |
| /Burma | Total | 2 March 1962 | 18 September 1988 | 26 years, 200 days | Chapter XVI General Provisions: "In order to overcome this deterioration and to build Socialism, the Revolutionary Council of the Union of Burma assumed responsibility as a historical mission, adopted the Burmese Way to Socialism and also formed the Burma Socialist Programme Party". |
| Cape Verde | Republic of Cape Verde | 5 July 1975 | 22 September 1992 | 17 years, 79 days | Chapter 1, Article 1: "Cape Verde is a sovereign, democratic, laic, unitary, anti-colonialist and anti-imperialist state". It was a one-party state ruled by the African Party for the Independence of Cape Verde, whose goal was the construction of a socialist society and which received support from other socialist states. |
| Chad | Republic of Chad | 16 April 1962 | 13 April 1975 | 12 years, 362 days | From 1962 to 1975, the African socialist Chadian Progressive Party was the sole legal political party in Chad. |
| Djibouti | Republic of Djibouti | 24 October 1981 | 3 October 1992 | 10 years, 345 days | Law on National Mobilization Part 2, Article 4: "During the National Mobilization the People's Rally for Progress guarantees the formation and expression of popular consensus and the national will for economic and social transformation. It brings to the President of the Republic, guarantor of national unity, the support of its organization and the action of its activists. It ensures within it the democratic debate between the various social, cultural, economic and regional components of the national community as well as their equitable representation, their free expression and right of proposal. Its statutes must promote a broad development of internal democracy as well as broad popular support for the various institutions of the Republic". The People's Rally for Progress is a socialist party. |
| Egypt | Republic of Egypt | 18 June 1953 | 22 February 1958 | 4 years, 249 days | Neither 1953 constitutional declaration, 1956 Egyptian Constitution nor the Provisional Constitution of the United Arab Republic used the word 'socialist' or 'socialism', but the sole legal parties – the Liberation Rally and the National Union – were socialist. |
| Egypt | United Arab Republic | 22 February 1958 | 28 September 1961 | 3 years, 218 days | Neither 1953 constitutional declaration, 1956 Egyptian Constitution nor the Provisional Constitution of the United Arab Republic used the word 'socialist' or 'socialism', but the sole legal parties – the Liberation Rally and the National Union – were socialist. |
| Egypt | Arab Republic of Egypt | 28 September 1961 | 26 March 2007 | 45 years, 179 days | Article One of 1964 constitution of Egypt, then known as the United Arab Republic, directly mentioned socialism: "The United Arab Republic is a democratic, socialist State based on the alliance of the working powers of the people" Article One of the Egyptian Constitution of 1971: "The Arab Republic of Egypt is a Socialist Democratic State based on the alliance of the working forces of the people." The 2007 Amendments removed the mention of Egypt as a socialist state from Article One. Socialism was still mentioned in the preamble and other sections, but fully removed following the 2011 revolution. |
| Egypt | Total | 18 June 1953 | 26 March 2007 | 53 years, 281 days (Note: The ruling National Democratic Party was deposed on 11 February 2011 (after 57 years, 238 days) and the Egyptian Constitutional Declaration of 30 March 2011 (after 57 years, 285 days) fully removed any references to socialism.) | |
| Equatorial Guinea | Republic of Equatorial Guinea | 7 July 1970 | 3 August 1979 | 9 years, 27 days | See the 1973 Equatorial Guinean constitutional referendum. Preamble: "The United National Workers' Party of Equatorial Guinea (PUNT), draws up the general policy of the nation, and coordinates and controls it through the State organs". The United National Workers' Party was a political party based on African socialism. |
| Ghana | Republic of Ghana | 1 July 1960 | 24 February 1966 | 5 years, 238 days | Part 1, Article 2: "In the confident expectation of an early surrender of sovereignty to a union of African states and territories, the people now confer on Parliament the power to provide for the surrender of the whole or any part of the sovereignty of Ghana". See the 1960 Ghanaian constitutional referendum. Kwame Nkrumah, the first President of Ghana, is mentioned in the 1960 constitution. Nkrumah and his party, the Convention People's Party, were African socialists, whose party constitution stated: "To establish a socialist state in which all men and women shall have equal opportunity and where there shall be no capital[ist] exploitation". Ghana's Seven Year Development plan included the task to "[e]mbark upon the socialist transformation of the economy through the rapid development of state and co-operative sectors". |
| Guinea | People's Revolutionary Republic of Guinea | 2 October 1958 | 3 April 1984 | 25 years, 184 days | From 1958 to 1984, the African socialist Democratic Party of Guinea – African Democratic Rally was the sole legal political party in Guinea. |
| Guinea-Bissau | Republic of Guinea-Bissau | 10 September 1974 | 9 May 1991 | 16 years, 241 days | Chapter 1, Article 1: "Guinea-Bissau is a sovereign, democratic, laic, unitary, anti-colonialist and anti-imperialist state". It was a one-party state ruled by the African Party for the Independence of Guinea and Cape Verde, whose goal was the construction of a socialist society and which received support from other socialist states. |
| /Iraq | Iraqi Republic | 14 July 1958 | 8 February 1963 | 4 years, 209 days | From 1958 to 1963, the Iraqi Communist Party held significant power within the progressive military government of General Abd al-Karim Qasim. See the 14 July Revolution. |
| /Iraq | Iraqi Republic | 8 February 1963 | 17 July 1968 | 5 years, 160 days | Part 1, Article 1: "The Republic of Iraq is a democratic, socialist state, deriving the principles of her democracy and socialism from the Arab Heritage and the Islamic spirit." From 1963 to 1968, the Arab Socialist Union was the sole legal political party in Iraq. |
| /Iraq | Iraqi Republic | 17 July 1968 | 7 April 2005 | 36 years, 264 days | Chapter 1, Article 1: "Its [the country's] basic objective is the realization of one Arab State and the build-up of the socialist system". |
| /Iraq | Total | 14 July 1958 | 7 April 2005 | 46 years, 267 days | Chapter 1, Article 1: "Its [the country's] basic objective is the realization of one Arab State and the build-up of the socialist system". |
| /Libya | Libyan Arab Republic | 1 September 1969 | 2 March 1977 | 7 years, 182 days | Section 1, Article 6: "The aim of the state is the realization of socialism through the application of social justice which forbids any form of exploitation". |
| /Libya | Socialist People's Libyan Arab Jamahiriya | 2 March 1977 | 15 April 1986 | 9 years, 44 days | Section 1, Article 6: "The aim of the state is the realization of socialism through the application of social justice which forbids any form of exploitation". |
| /Libya | Great Socialist People's Libyan Arab Jamahiriya | 15 April 1986 | 20 October 2011 | 25 years, 188 days | Section 1, Article 6: "The aim of the state is the realization of socialism through the application of social justice which forbids any form of exploitation". |
| /Libya | Total | 1 September 1969 | 20 October 2011 | 42 years, 49 days | Section 1, Article 6: "The aim of the state is the realization of socialism through the application of social justice which forbids any form of exploitation". |
| Madagascar | Democratic Republic of Madagascar | 30 December 1975 | 12 September 1992 | 16 years, 257 days | Preamble: "The Malagasy people,[...] — Determined to build a State of a new type, expression of the interests of the working masses, and to build a society in conformity with the socialist principles set out in the 'Charter of the Malagasy Socialist Revolution'，" |
| Mali | Republic of Mali | 20 June 1960 | 26 March 1991 | 30 years, 251 days | From 1960 to 1968, the African socialist Sudanese Union – African Democratic Rally was the sole legal political party in Mali. The 1974 Malian constitution provided for a one-party system which was ruled by the socialist Democratic Union of the Malian People. |
| Mauritania | Islamic Republic of Mauritania | 25 December 1961 | 10 December 1984 | 16 years, 197 days | Chapter 1, Article 9: "The popular will is expressed through the democratically organized State Party. The Mauritanian People's Party, born from the merger of the national parties existing on December 25, 1961, is recognized as the only party of the State". The Mauritanian People's Party was a political party based on Islamic socialism. |
| São Tomé and Príncipe | Democratic Republic of São Tomé and Príncipe | 12 July 1975 | 20 September 1990 | 15 years, 70 days | Preamble: "[…], the people of São Tomé and Príncipe continue their irreversible march on the path of democratic and popular revolution with the aim of achieving the economic, social and cultural objectives defined in the M.L.S.T.P. program, aiming at the construction of a society free from the exploitation of man by man, the consolidation of the unity of the African peoples and the strengthening of friendship and solidarity with all the peoples of the world." The M.L.S.T.P. is a political party based on African socialism. |
| Senegal | Republic of Senegal | 20 August 1960 | 24 April 1981 | 20 years, 247 days | From 1960 to 1975, the African socialist Senegalese Progressive Union (UPS) was the sole legal political party in Senegal and until 1981 constitutionally only three parties were allowed: a socialist party (UPS), a liberal party and a Marxist–Leninist communist party. |
| Seychelles | Republic of Seychelles | 5 June 1977 | 27 December 1991 | 14 years, 205 days | Preamble: "Seychelles is declared to be a sovereign socialist republic". |
| Sierra Leone | Republic of Sierra Leone | 12 July 1978 | 1 October 1991 | 13 years, 81 days | Chapter X, Article 176: "The All People's Congress established and in being immediately prior to the commencement of this Constitution shall continue in being thereafter and be deemed to be the One Party officially recognised in Sierra Leone". The All People's Congress is a political party based on African socialism. |
| Sudan | Democratic Republic of the Sudan | 25 May 1969 | 10 October 1985 | 16 years, 138 days | Preamble: "In the belief of our pursuit of freedom, socialism and democracy to achieve the society of sufficiency, justice and equality". |
| /Syria | Syrian Arab Republic | 8 March 1963 | 27 February 2012 | 48 years, 356 days (Note: Syria remained under Ba'athist rule until its collapse on 8 December 2024 (61 years, 275 days).) | Section 1, Article 8: "The leading party in the society and the state is the Socialist Arab Ba'ath Party. It leads a patriotic and progressive front seeking to unify the resources of the people's masses and place them at the service of the Arab nation's goals". |
| Tanzania | United Republic of Tanzania | 26 April 1964 | 1 July 1992 | 28 years, 66 days | Part 1, Article 3 (2): "Until the union of the Tanganyika African National Union with the Afro-Shirazi Party (which United Party shall constitute the one political Party), the Party shall, in and for Tanganyika, be the, Tanganyika African National Union and, in and for Zanzibar, be the Afro-Shirazi Party." The Tanganyika African National Union was a populist socialist party based on the Ujamaa ideology. Article 3 of the Constitution of Tanzania of 1977: "The Union Republic is a democratic and socialist nation with one political party." |
| Tunisia | Republic of Tunisia | 22 October 1964 | 27 February 1988 | 23 years, 128 days | From 1964 to 1988, the Socialist Destourian Party was the sole legal political party in Tunisia. |
| Zambia | Republic of Zambia | 25 August 1973 | 24 August 1991 | 17 years, 364 days | Section 1, Article 4: "There shall be one and only one political party or organization in Zambia, namely, the United National Independence Party". The United National Independence Party is a political party based on African socialism. |

== Socialist autonomous regions ==
These are territories that have claimed autonomy and declared themselves as socialist under some interpretation of the term. While these regions have created stable institutions of governance that have existed for a considerable period of time, they are not widely recognized as autonomous by the international community and officially are parts of other sovereign states under international law.

| Territory | Since | Until | Duration | Form of government | Notes |
|---|---|---|---|---|---|
| Wa State | 17 April 1989 | – | 37 years, 5 months | One-party socialist state | Founded in 1989, Wa State is governed by the United Wa State Party, a Maoist and Wa nationalist party, reported to have good relations and a close connection with the Chinese Communist Party. |
| Eastern Shan State Special Region 4 | 30 June 1989 | – | 37 years, 1 month | One-party socialist state | Founded in 1989 after the collapse of the Communist Party of Burma, Eastern Shan State Special Region 4, which is commonly known as Mong La, or the Special Zone, is governed by the Peace and Solidarity Committee, a socialist and Shan nationalist party and the political wing of the NDAA, reported to have good relations and a close connection with the other groups that split from the Communist Party of Burma, namely the United Wa State Army and the similarly named Myanmar National Democratic Alliance Army. |
| Zapatista autonomous territory | 1 January 1994 | – | 32 years, 8 months | Libertarian socialist confederal semi-direct democracy | Founded as the Zapatista territories; the municipalities dissolved in 2023 and were restructured into the Zapatista Autonomous Government Collectives. This autonomous region's governance is inspired by the neozapatista ideology of the Zapatista Army of National Liberation. Zapatista autonomy began with the Zapatista uprising in 1994. |
| Autonomous Administration of North and East Syria | 19 July 2012 | 20 August 2026 | 14 years, 1 month | Libertarian socialist federal semi-direct democracy | Commonly called Rojava, the Autonomous Administration of North and East Syria's governance is inspired by democratic confederalism. Its autonomy began with the Rojava Revolution in 2012. |
| Kokang | 5 January 2024 | – | 2 years, 8 months | One-party socialist state | Founded in 1990, following the collapse of the Communist Party of Burma insurgency, Kokang is governed by the Myanmar National Democratic Alliance Army, a Maoist and Kokang nationalist party, that split from the Communist Party of Burma. They are reported to have good relations and a close connection with the Chinese Communist Party along with the other groups that split from the Communist Party of Burma, such as the United Wa State Party and the National Democratic Alliance Army. The MNDAA lost control over Kokang in 2009 after the 2009 Kokang incident. The MNDAA regained power following the start of the Myanmar civil war (2021–present). |

== Ephemeral socialist states and polities ==
These are short-lived political entities that emerged during revolutions, wars, or unrest that declared themselves as having followed socialist ideologies, including anarchism and communism, but did not survive long enough to create a stable government or achieve international recognition. Many were short-lived political entities which were established locally during the Revolutions of 1917–1923 uprisings or by World War II partisans. While some were founded by communists as soviet republics they were not considered part of actually existing socialism in Soviet historiography and usually did not have a clearly defined claimed territory nor a proper constitution.

=== Pre-Cold War ===
- Lyon Commune (4 September 1870 – 28 September 1870; 22 March 1871 – 25 March 1871)
- Paris Commune (18 March 1871 – 28 May 1871)
- Committee of Public Health (8 July 1873 – 13 July 1873)
- Republic of Guria (May 1902 – 10 January 1906)
- Strandzha Commune (18 August 1903 – 8 September 1903)
- Markovo Republic (31 October 1905 – 18 July 1906)
- Stary Buyan Republic (12 November 1905 – 26 November 1905)
- Chita Republic (22 November 1905 – 22 January 1906)
- Novorossiysk Republic (12 December 1905 – 25 December 1905)
- Shuliavka Republic (12 December 1905 – 16 December 1906)
- Comrat Republic (6 January 1906 – 12 January 1906)
- Socialist Republic of Baja California (January 1911 – June 1911)
- Ukrainian People's Republic (23 June 1917 – 18 March 1921)
- Harbin Soviet (September 1917 – December 1918)
- Executive Committee of the Soviet of Workers, Soldiers, and the Landless in Latvia (21 November 1917 – 3 March 1918)
- Soviet Republic of Soldiers and Fortress-Builders of Naissaar (December 1917 – February 1918)
- Baku Commune (13 April 1918 – 25 July 1918)
- (China) Constitution Protection Region of Southern Fujian (1 September 1918 – 12 August 1920)
- Banat Republic (31 October 1918 – 20 February 1919)
- Republic of Tarnobrzeg (6 November 1918 – Spring 1919)
- Free Socialist Republic of Germany (9 November 1918 – 11 August 1919)
  - People's State of Bavaria (8 November 1918 – 6 April 1919)
  - Mainz Workers' and Soldiers' Council (9 November 1918 – 9 December 1918)
  - Alsace-Lorraine Soviet Republic (10 November 1918 – 22 November 1918)
  - Soviet Republic of Saxony (13 November 1918 – 11 May 1919)
  - Würzburg Soviet Republic (7 April 1919 – 9 April 1919)
- Transcaucasian Democratic Federative Republic (22 April 1918 – 28 May 1918)
- Belarusian People's Republic (6 March 1918 – 28 April 1919)
- Democratic Republic of Georgia (26 May 1918 – 25 February 1921)
- Hungarian People's Republic (16 November 1918 – 21 March 1919)
- Makhnovshchina (27 November 1918 – 28 August 1921)
- Brussels Soldiers' Council (10-16 November 1918)
- Limerick Soviet (14 April 1919 – 17 April 1919)
- Bessarabian Soviet Socialist Republic (May 1919 – September 1919; 15 September 1924 – 18 September 1924)
- Zemstvo of Maritime Territory (January 31, 1920 – October 28, 1920)
- Provisional Polish Revolutionary Committee (23 July 1920 – Late August 1920)
- Labin Republic (2 March 1921 – 8 April 1921)
- Provisional People's Government of Mongolia (11 July 1921 – 26 November 1924)
- Serbian–Hungarian Baranya–Baja Republic (14 August 1921 – 20 August 1921)
- Soviet Zone (1927–1937)
  - Hunan Soviet (September 1927 – October 1927)
  - Guangzhou Soviet Government (12 December 1927 – 13 December 1927)
- Korean People's Association in Manchuria (1929–1931)
- Nghệ-Tĩnh Soviet (1930–1931)
  - Central Revolutionary Base Area (1931–1934)
- Xinjiang Clique (14 April 1933 – 1941/44) (Note: Distanced itself from the Soviet Union in 1941 but Sheng Shicai tried to reestablish ties in 1944 before resigning on 29 August 1944 to become minister of the Nationalist government.)
- People's Revolutionary Government of the Republic of China (22 November 1933 – 13 January 1934)
- Asturian Commune (October 1934)
- Regional Defence Council of Aragon (1936–1937)
- Revolutionary Catalonia (1936–1939)
- Sovereign Council of Asturias and León (6 September 1936 – 21 October 1937)
- Shaan-Gan-Ning Border Region (1937–1946)
- Republic of Užice (28 July 1941 – 1 December 1941)
- Bihać Republic (4 November 1942 – 29 January 1943)
- Political Committee of National Liberation (10 March 1944 – 9 October 1944)
- Red Republic of Caulonia (6 March 1945 – 9 March 1945)
- Inner Mongolian People's Republic (9 September 1945 – 6 November 1945)
- Soviet Civil Administration (24 August 1945 – 9 September 1948)
- Liberated Zone (3 May 1946 – 1 October 1949)
- Provisional People's Committee for North Korea (8 February 1946 – 21 February 1947)
- People's Committee of North Korea (22 February 1947 – 9 September 1948)

=== Cold War ===
- Provisional Democratic Government (23 December 1947 – 28 August 1949)
- Union of Burma (4 January 1948 – 2 March 1962)
- Government of the National Front of Madiun (18 September 1948 – 19 December 1948)
- Marquetalia Republic (1948–1964)
- Free Republic of the Congo (12 December 1960 – 16 January 1962)
- Republic of Tanganyika (9 December 1962 – 26 April 1964)
- Republic of the Congo (16 August 1963 – 4 September 1968)
- People's Republic of Zanzibar (12 January 1964 – 26 April 1964)
- People's Republic of the Congo (5 September 1964 – 1965)
- Yemen Arab Republic (26 September 1962 – 5 November 1967)
- (First) Republic of Uganda (24 February 1966 – 25 January 1971)
- (First) Republic of Burundi (28 November 1966 – 1 November 1976)
- Maquis of Fizi (24 October 1967 – 1 July 1986)
- Revolutionary Government of the Armed Forces of Peru (3 October 1968 – 29 August 1975)
- Provisional Revolutionary Government of the Republic of South Vietnam (8 June 1969 – 30 April 1975)
- Military Command Council (13 June 1974 – 24 June 1978)
- Democratic Republic of East Timor (28 November 1975 – 7 December 1975)
- State of the Comoros (3 August 1975 – 13 May 1978)
- Vanuaaku People's Provisional Government (29 November 1977 – 21 December 1978)
- Junta of National Reconstruction (18 July 1979 – 10 January 1985)
- Democratic People's Republic of Angola (11 November 1975 – 1992/2002) (Note: The RDPA was a rival government against the communist People's Republic of Angola ruled by the MPLA. It was ruled by the UNITA which founded as Maoist liberation movement but gained support from the West and South Africa against the Communist bloc and the Frontline States. Eventually UNITA abandoned socialism all together.)
- National Military Council (25 February 1980 – 25 November 1987)
- New Democratic Republic (17 May 1980 – 12 September 1992)
- National Revolutionary Council (30 July 1981 – 5 August 1981)
- Coalition Government of Democratic Kampuchea (22 June 1982 – 24 September 1993)
- National Council for the Revolution (2 August 1984 – 15 October 1987/2 June 1991) (Note: Thomas Sankara was deposed in 1987 by Blaise Compaoré who continued to claim to be Sankarist. Orthodox socialism was abandoned by the introduction of the 1991 constitution but Compaoré's left-leaning Congress for Democracy and Progress continued to rule to his deposition in 2014.)
- Republic of Kuwait (4 August 1990 – 28 August 1990)

=== Post-Cold War ===
- Democratic Republic of Yemen (21 May 1994 – 7 July 1994)
- Provisional Government of National Union and National Salvation of Cambodia (11 July 1994 – 22 June 1998)
- Capitol Hill Autonomous Zone (8 June 2020 – 1 July 2020)

== See also ==
- Liberal democratic constitutions with references to socialism
- Communist state
- Second World
- People's republic
- Socialism in one country
- State of socialist orientation
- State socialism
