= Egyptian Fundamental Ordinance =

The Fundamental Ordinance of 1882 was a constitution of the Khedivate of Egypt, an autonomous tributary state of the Ottoman Empire. It followed an abortive attempt to promulgate a constitution in 1879. The document was limited in scope and was effectively more of an organic law of the Consultative Council to the khedive than an actual constitution.

== See also ==
- History of the Egyptian Constitution
- Egyptian Constitution of 1879 (abortive)
- Egyptian Constitution of 1923
- Egyptian Constitution of 1930
- Egyptian Constitution of 1956
- Provisional Constitution of the United Arab Republic of 1958
- Egyptian Constitution of 1964 ("Constitution of the United Arab Republic", provisional)
- Egyptian Constitution of 1971
- Egyptian Constitutional Declaration of 2011 (provisional)
- Egyptian Constitution of 2012
- Egyptian Constitution of 2014
