= Egyptian Constitution of 1879 =

The Constitution of 1879 was an abortive attempt by the prime minister to promulgate a constitution for Egypt in 1879. It failed when the khedive, Isma'il Pasha, was toppled by the British that year.

== See also ==
- History of the Egyptian Constitution
- Egyptian Fundamental Ordinance of 1882
- Egyptian Constitution of 1923
- Egyptian Constitution of 1930
- Egyptian Constitution of 1956
- Provisional Constitution of the United Arab Republic of 1958
- Egyptian Constitution of 1964 ("Constitution of the United Arab Republic", provisional)
- Egyptian Constitution of 1971
- Egyptian Constitutional Declaration of 2011 (provisional)
- Egyptian Constitution of 2012
- Egyptian Constitution of 2014
