= Egyptian Constitution of 1930 =

The Constitution of 1930 was the constitution of Egypt from October 1930 to December 1935. The 1930 constitution saw a large erosion of the liberal and democratic systems put in place by the previous constitution of 1923 after the 1919 Egyptian revolution. It was only after major backlash from the Egyptian people led by the Wafd party, the major liberal party that initially emerged from the 1919 revolution, that the 1923 system was restored in 1935.

== History ==
After the 1919 revolution, the High Commissioner in Egypt Edmund Allenby noted that Egyptian politics was divided between three main forces: the palace led by King Fu'ad, the aristocrats led by the Liberal Constitutional Party and the democrats led by the Wafd. The 1923 constitution framed Egypt as a bicameral parliamentary kingdom; the Chamber of Deputies was democratically elected while two-fifths of the senate and its president was chosen by the king. The king also had the right to choose and appoint the prime minister, as well as the right to postpone parliamentary sessions. The Wafd reluctantly accepted the document, as they had boycotted the constitutional committee, while the King used every power he had to undermine the new system. For this goal, he had many monarchist allies among the conservative elite; the Ittihad party was formed in 1925 to fight against the Wafd's "veiled Republicanism".

After dismissing the Wafdist government led by Mustafa al-Nahhas, King Fu'ad appointed Ismail Sidqi as prime minister. He had previously served as the Minister of the Interior in 1925, where he tried to rig the 1925 elections by censoring the press, gerrymandering districts and changing the electoral law to create a two-stage process for indirect voting. Sidqi was a Liberal Constitutionalist, but after agreeing to form a cabinet he resigned from the party. His first act was to postpone the parliamentary session for one month, later ordering the gates of parliament locked and chained and the building surrounded by police. In response, the Wafd organized meetings with their members and leaders in support of the constitution. Wafdist deputies smashed the chains surrounding parliament, after which they held a session where they announced their support for the constitution. With the support from land-owners out of fear from "the wrath of the peasantry" after the start of the Great Depression, the Sidqi government moved to rewrite the constitution.

The 1930 constitution increased the number of king-appointed senators from two-fifths to three-fifths, while the absolute number of senators decreased from 150 to 100, and the number of deputies decreased from 235 to 150. The minimum duration of a parliamentary session was decreased from six months to five. Furthermore, a new electoral law increased the age of voters of 21 to 25, with stricter property and education requirements for delegates in a two-tiered electoral system where voters voted for delegates who in turn cast a vote for members of parliament.

In response, the Liberal Constitutionalists withdrew their support of the government. Sidqi formed a new political party, the "People's Party", on November 17th 1930 to prepare for the upcoming new elections. On the 31st of March 1931, the Wafd and the Liberals formed a coalition agreement, where they agreed to fight for the return of the 1923 system. Wafdist leaders toured the country where they ignited the masses to protest the regime. In one incident in Mansura, 145 people were wounded by the police. People shouted in the street “Down with the King" and "Fuad is the enemy of the constitution".

The Liberals and Wafdists agreed to boycott the 1931 elections. Sidqi was convinced that a parliament, even a rigged one, was needed to give his government some legitimacy. Sidqi's cabinet was also plagued by corruption scandals, leading to the resignation of Ali Maher and Abdel Fattah Yahya; Sidqi himself resigned over health considerations after suffering a stroke. A series of governments was formed while negotiations continued between the Wafd, the British and the King. By November 1935, protesters were shouting "Down with Britain! Down with Hoare! Down with Premier Nessim Pasha! We want the 1923 Constitution!", as well as demanding that the Wafd form a national front with the other parties. On the 12th of December 1935, the government of Mohamed Tawfik Naseem reinstated the 1923 Constitution, just before the 1936 elections, which saw the Wafd win a decisive majority.

== See also ==
- History of the Egyptian Constitution
- Egyptian Constitution of 1879 (abortive)
- Egyptian Fundamental Ordinance of 1882
- Egyptian Constitution of 1923
- Egyptian Constitution of 1956
- Provisional Constitution of the United Arab Republic of 1958
- Egyptian Constitution of 1964 ("Constitution of the United Arab Republic", provisional)
- Egyptian Constitution of 1971
- Egyptian Constitutional Declaration of 2011 (provisional)
- Egyptian Constitution of 2012
- Egyptian Constitution of 2014

== Sources ==
- Whidden, James (2013). Monarchy and Modernity in Egypt: Politics, Islam and Neo-Colonialism Between the Wars. I.B. Tauris. ISBN 9781848857063.
- Deeb, Marius (1979). Party Politics in Egypt: the Wafd & its Rivals 1919–1939. Ithaca Press. ISBN 9780903729406.
- Khatib, M.F (1954). The working of parliamentary institutions in Egypt, 1924-1952 (Thesis). University of Edinburgh.
- Marsot, Afaf Lutfi Al-Sayyid (1977). Egypt’s Liberal Experiment: 1922–1936. University of California Press. ISBN 9780520031098.
- Quraishi, Zaheer M. (1967). Liberal Nationalism in Egypt; Rise and Fall of the Wafd Party. Jamal Printing Press. ISBN 9780861990009.
- Terry, Janice J. (1982). The Wafd: Cornerstone of Egyptian Political Power. Publisher: Third World Centre for Research and Publishing. ISBN 9780861990009.

=== Primary Sources ===
- Khalil, Muhammad (1962). "Royal Order No. 70, Establishing a Constitutional Regime for Egypt The Constitution of October 22, 1930". The Arab States and the Arab League: A Documentary Record. Vol. 1. Khayats. pp. 475–492.
