= History of the Egyptian Constitution =

Aspect of modern Egyptian history

The Constitution of Egypt has evolved over a long period of time, from the liberal constitution of 1923 to the modern constitution.

== Ancient Egypt ==
Egypt is known for having one of the earliest administrative and legislative codes in history. Pharaonic civilization laid the groundwork there in terms of governance and management. The king, or Pharaoh, at the top of the state hierarchy and appointed high-ranking government officials.

== Early Islamic era ==
During the Islamic era, governance and legislation were principally drawn from the Qur'an and the Sunnah (Traditions of the Prophet). This was based on the formula of consultation as one of the fundamental principles of Islamic law.

When Egypt became the centre of the Shi'ite Fatimid Caliphate (969-1171), the state reformed its administrative laws and centralised its government. Furthermore, the city of Cairo was built to become the capital of Egypt.

During the Ayyubid Sultanate (1171–1250), the Cairo Citadel became the headquarters of the government and centre of power. Legislative and judicial councils diversified, with a specialised justice council and another to address complaints lodged by the public. Their duties involved both domestic laws as well as the ratification of treaties with foreign countries.

In Mamluk Egypt (1250–1517), Sultan Al-Zaher Baybars built the Court of Justice within the Saladin Citadel to serve as the seat of government. Its jurisdiction covered the enforcement of laws, the settling of disputes, and negotiations with nearby countries.

== Ottoman Empire ==
During the Ottoman era (1517–1805), Islamic courts constituted the judicial system. Judges based their verdicts directly based on Islamic jurisprudence (Sharia) for civil and criminal disputes. This system remained in effect until the end of the 18th century, in which Egypt had been the scene of crucial political and social developments.

In 1795, almost six years after the French Revolution, a major political uprising demanding rights, freedoms and justice erupted. It brought together national forces and popular leadership in support of national demands for justice, equality, and freedom.

As a result of the mounting resistance against the Ottoman ruler, the Wali, and Mamluks, Egypt was on the verge of a massive revolt. This led to the 'Ulama writing a written document which outlined the relationship between the ruler and the subject, successfully averting a tax increase without the consent of the people's representatives.

== 20th century ==
Egypt's first 20th-century constitution was enacted in 1923, the country's first modern codified national constitution. It established for monarchical dominance with the king as head of state with power to influence the legislature. The 1923 Constitution remained in effect throughout the remainder of the monarchy except for the period from 1930 to 1935 when the Constitution of 1930 was in effect.

Second constitutional declaration, 10 February 1953

Following the Egyptian revolution of 1952 that led to the overthrow of King Farouk and eventually the monarchy, the Constitution of 1923 was abolished by decree in December 1952. In 1953, a provisional constitution was proclaimed on 10 February, and Egypt was declared a republic on 18 June. The republic was governed under martial law until mid-1956.

The Constitution of 1956 adopted by President Gamal Abdel Nasser was the first republican constitution and it stipulated the formation of the National Assembly on 22 July 1957. The assembly was made up of 350 elected members and remained effective until 10 February 1958, when the Egyptian-Syrian merger into the United Arab Republic was enforced and the 1956 Constitution was revoked.

The Provisional Constitution of the United Arab Republic was formulated in March 1958, and a joint National Assembly was established. It first met on 21 July 1960 and lasted to 22 June 1961.

Following the 1961 secession of the Syrian Arab Republic from the UAR on 21 May 1962, Nasser issued a National Charter that was approved by a 1,750-member National Congress of Popular Powers on 30 June. Though not a constitution, this charter was a distillation of Nasser's Arab socialist ideology and the basis for future constitutional efforts in the 1960s. On 27 September 1962, a presidential Constitutional Proclamation was made, which stipulated that the Provisional Constitution of 1958 should remain in force insofar as it did not contradict the Proclamation.

In March 1964, another provisional Constitution was declared, titled the "Constitution of the United Arab Republic", leading to a 350-elected member National Assembly. This Assembly lasted from 26 March 1964 to 12 November 1968. New elections were held on 20 January 1969, and the Assembly was valid until 30 August 1971. Egypt continued to officially be known as the United Arab Republic during this period.

In 1971, when President Anwar Sadat took office, he moved towards the adoption of a new democratic constitution that would allow for greater freedoms; the return to a more sound parliamentary life, correct democratic practice and made Sharia a "source of legislation" (Article II), amended in 1980 to read "the principal source of legislation." With the 1971 constitution, the country was renamed the Arab Republic of Egypt.

== 21st century ==
In 2005, President Hosni Mubarak asked the parliament to amend Article 76 of the constitution that defines how the President of Egypt is elected.

=== 2011 Egyptian revolution ===
During the 2011 Egyptian revolution, opponents to President Mubarak's rule demanded modifications to or a rewrite of the constitution. On 10 February 2011, Mubarak stated that he had requested that Articles 76, 77, 88, 93 and 181 be amended and that Article 179 be removed. Following Mubarak's resignation, the military government appointed the Egyptian constitutional review committee of 2011 and proposed that Articles 76, 77, 88, 93, 139, 148 and 189 be amended and Article 179 removed. On 30 March, a new provisional constitution was adopted based on the amended articles in addition to other aimed at steering through the transition period of constitutional reform. A new constitution was approved in 2012.

=== 2013–2014 ===
President Mohamed Morsi was removed from office in July 2013, and the 2012 constitution was suspended. A roadmap was put in place by the interim government, which included drafting a new constitution. A constitutional referendum took place from 14–15 January 2014, with the overwhelming majority of voters approving the revised constitution.

== List of written constitutions ==
- Monarchy
  - Constitution of 1879: 1879 (abortive)
  - Fundamental Ordinance of 1882: 1882
  - Constitution of 1923: 1923–1930, 1935–1952
  - Constitution of 1930: 1930–1935
- Republic, following the abolition of the monarchy
  - Provisional constitution of 1953: 10 February – 1956
  - Constitution of 1956: 23 June 1956 – 1958
  - Constitution of 1958 (provisional, United Arab Republic): 10 February 1958 – 1962
  - Constitutional Proclamation of 1962: 27 September 1962 – 1964
  - Constitution of 1964 ("Constitution of the United Arab Republic", provisional): 1964–1971
  - Constitution of 1971: 11 September 1971 – 2011; adopted by President Anwar Sadat
  - Constitutional Declaration of 2011 (provisional): 2011–2012; following the Egyptian Revolution of 2011
  - Constitution of 2012: 2012–2014; approved by a referendum on 15 and 22 December 2012
  - Constitution of 2014: 2014–present; revision of the 2012 Constitution approved by a referendum on 14–15 January 2014
