= Egyptian Constitution of 1956 =

The Constitution of 1956 was the constitution of Egypt from 1956 to 1958. It was promulgated on 19 January 1956 was implemented by referendum on 23 June, with Gamal Abdel Nasser being elected president simultaneously. It replaced a 1953 provisional constitution which in turn had replaced the Constitution of 1923 following the revolution of 1952. With the 1958 political union of Egypt and the Syrian Republic as the United Arab Republic, the 1956 Constitution was superseded by the Provisional Constitution of the United Arab Republic.

== See also ==
- History of the Egyptian Constitution
- Egyptian Constitution of 1879 (abortive)
- Egyptian Fundamental Ordinance of 1882
- Egyptian Constitution of 1923
- Egyptian Constitution of 1930
- Provisional Constitution of the United Arab Republic of 1958
- Egyptian Constitution of 1964 ("Constitution of the United Arab Republic", provisional)
- Egyptian Constitution of 1971
- Egyptian Constitutional Declaration of 2011 (provisional)
- Egyptian Constitution of 2012
- Egyptian Constitution of 2014
