= Constitution of the United Arab Republic =

The Constitution of the United Arab Republic may refer to:

- The Provisional Constitution of the United Arab Republic of the 1958–61 union of Egypt and Syria, the United Arab Republic
- The Egyptian Constitution of 1964, officially the "Constitution of the United Arab Republic", in effect from 1964 to 1971
