= 1961 Syrian constitutional referendum =

- 1 December 1961

Results
Choice	Votes	%
Yes	617,880	97.06%
No	18,706	2.94%

A constitutional referendum was held in Syria on 1 December 1961. Voters had the choice of submitting a green ballot marked "I am in favour of the Provisional Constitution" or a red one marked "I am against the Provisional Constitution". However, the ballot was not secret, and votes were made in the presence of an official. The Provisional Constitution was approved by 97% of voters.

== Results ==
Choice	Votes	%
For	617,880	97.06
Against	18,706	2.94
Total	636,586	100.00
Registered voters/turnout	636,586	–
Source: Nohlen et al.

== See also ==
- Provisional Syrian Constitution of 1961
