= Egyptian Constitution of 1964 =

The Constitution of the United Arab Republic or the Constitution of 1964 was the provisional constitution of Egypt from 1964 to 1971. It replaced the Provisional Constitution of the United Arab Republic of 1958 following the dissolution of the union of Egypt and Syria as the United Arab Republic. It was in turn replaced by the Constitution of 1971.

President Gamal Abdel Nasser had intended the constitution, which replaced a presidential Constitutional Proclamation of 27 September 1962, to be a "final constitution", but the result ended up being only an "interim document". On 23 March 1964, Nasser published a draft of the constitution and the recently elected new National Assembly approved the document on 25 March. The text was called the Constitution of the United Arab Republic although it only applied to Egypt. (Note: Egypt was officially called the United Arab Republic following the dissolution of the union with Syria until 1971.) After the death of Nasser, the Constitution of 1964 was superseded by the permanent Constitution of 1971 adopted under President Anwar Sadat on 11 September 1971.

== See also ==
- History of the Egyptian Constitution
- Egyptian Constitution of 1879 (abortive)
- Egyptian Fundamental Ordinance of 1882
- Egyptian Constitution of 1923
- Egyptian Constitution of 1930
- Egyptian Constitution of 1956
- Provisional Constitution of the United Arab Republic of 1958
- Egyptian Constitution of 1971
- Egyptian Constitutional Declaration of 2011 (provisional)
- Egyptian Constitution of 2012
- Egyptian Constitution of 2014
