= Provisional Constitution of the United Arab Republic =

Overview
- Original title: دستور الجمهورية العربية المتحدة
- Jurisdiction: United Arab Republic
- Date effective: 5 March 1958
- System: Unitary presidential republic

Government structure
- Branches: Three (executive, legislative and judiciary)
- Head of state: President
- Chambers: Unicameral (National Assembly)
- Executive: President as head of government
- Judiciary: Independent (no court specifically named)
- Federalism: Unitary
- Repealed: 28 September 1961 (in Syria); March 25, 1964 (in Egypt)
- Signatories: Gamal Abdel Nasser
- Supersedes: Constitution of 1956 (Egypt); Constitution of 1950 (Syria)
- Superseded by: Constitution of 1964 (Egypt); Provisional Constitution of 1961 (Syria)

Full text
- Provisional Constitution of the United Arab Republic (1958) at Wikisource
- دستور الجمهورية العربية المتحدة at Arabic Wikisource

The Provisional Constitution of the United Arab Republic or the Constitution of 1958 was the constitution for the short-lived political union between Egypt and Syria known as the United Arab Republic (UAR). This 74-article provisional constitution was formulated on 5 March 1958 and lasted until the Syrian coup d'état of 28 September 1961.

The provisional constitution established unitary (rather than federal) state from what had been the Republic of Egypt and the Syrian Republic, although the two parts retained a degree of their own identity de facto. The UAR was simultaneously in loose confederation with (North) Yemen as the United Arab States, as set out in the Charter of the United Arab States.

The provisional constitution distributed power accordingly to the legislative authority (the National Assembly), the executive authority (represented in the Council of Ministers in addition to the President of the Republic) and the judicial authority. A joint National Assembly was established; its members were appointed (400 from Egypt and 200 from Syria). It first met on 21 July 1960 and lasted until 22 June 1961.

Following the dissolution of the UAR, the constitution was superseded in Egypt first by a presidential 1962 Constitutional Proclamation, and then by a new "Constitution of the United Arab Republic" (Egypt retained the official name of United Arab Republic until 1971) which was also considered provisional. In Syria, the Provisional Constitution of 1961 was adopted until the promulgation of a new permanent constitution in 1962.

== See also ==
- History of the Egyptian Constitution
- Egyptian Constitution of 1879 (abortive)
- Egyptian Fundamental Ordinance of 1882
- Egyptian Constitution of 1923
- Egyptian Constitution of 1930
- Egyptian Constitution of 1956
- Egyptian Constitution of 1964 ("Constitution of the United Arab Republic", provisional)
- Egyptian Constitution of 1971
- Egyptian Constitutional Declaration of 2011 (provisional)
- Egyptian Constitution of 2012
- Egyptian Constitution of 2014
