= Constitution of 1958 =

Constitution of 1958 may refer to:

- French Constitution of 1958
- United Arab Republic 1958 Constitution
