= Constitution of 1956 =

Constitution of 1956 may refer to:

- Egyptian Constitution of 1956
- Constitution of Pakistan of 1956
- Constitution of Guatemala of 1956
