= Constitution of 1923 =

Constitution of 1923 may refer to:

- 1923 Constitution of Afghanistan
- Egyptian Constitution of 1923
- 1923 Constitution of Romania
