= President of Egypt =

Head of state and government

President of the Arab Republic of Egypt
- رئيس جمهورية مصر العربية
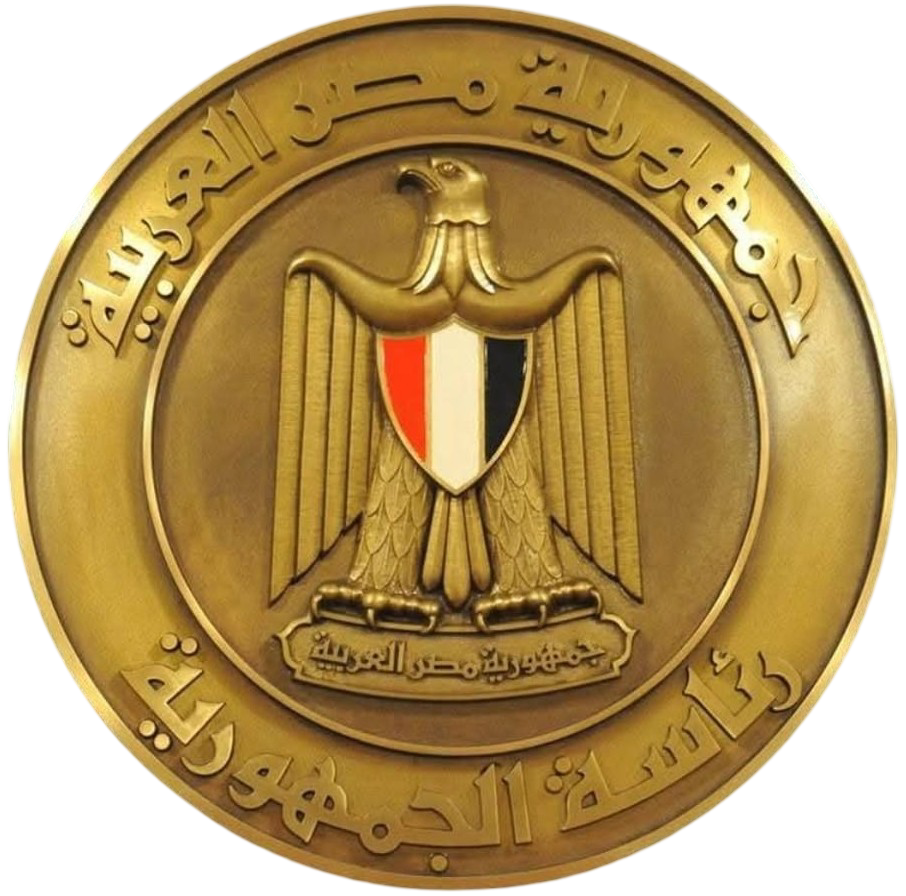
- Presidential emblem

- Presidential Standard

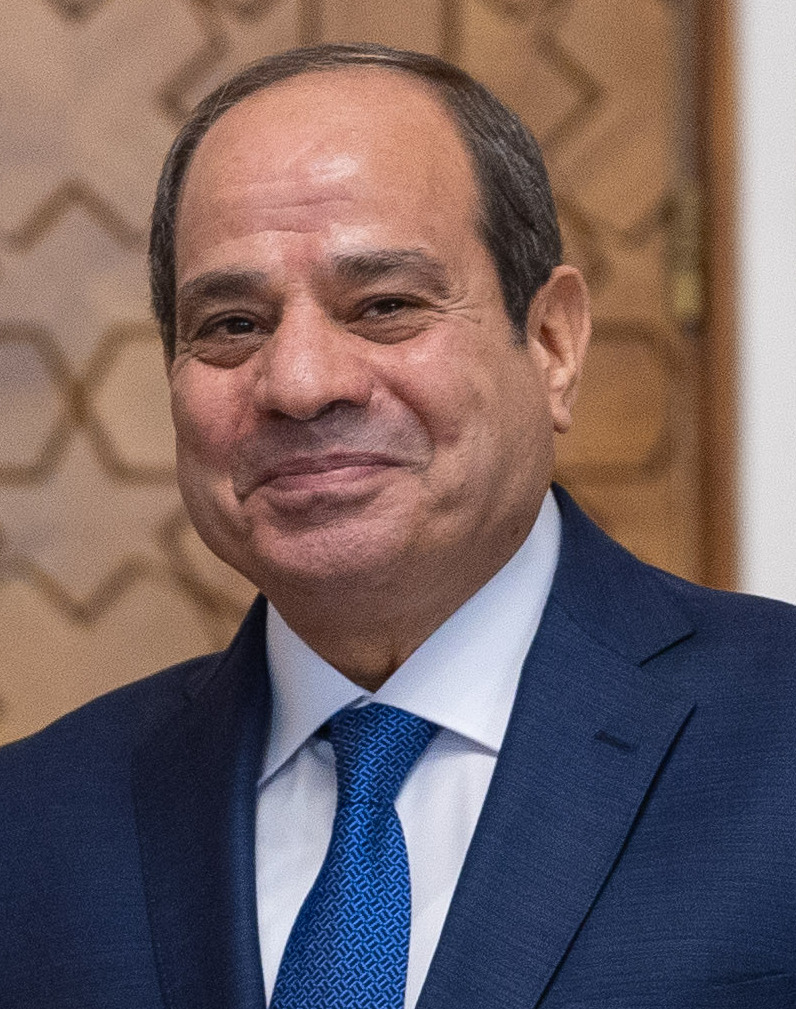
- Incumbent; Abdel Fattah el-Sisi since 8 June 2014
- Style: Mr. President (informal); His Excellency (formal, diplomatic)
- Status: Head of state Supreme commander of the Armed Forces
- Residence: Heliopolis Palace
- Seat: Cairo
- Appointer: Direct popular vote
- Term length: Six years, renewable once
- Constituting instrument: Constitution of Egypt (2014)
- Precursor: King of Egypt
- Formation: 18 June 1953; 73 years ago
- First holder: Mohamed Naguib
- Succession: Line of succession
- Deputy: Vice President
- Salary: E£2,224,548 (approx. US$72,000) annually
- Website: www.presidency.eg/EN

The president of the Arab Republic of Egypt (Egyptian Arabic: رئيس جمهورية مصر العربية, romanized: Ra'īs gumhūriyyat Miṣr al-ʻArabiyyah) is the head of state of Egypt. Under the various iterations of the Constitution of Egypt following the Egyptian revolution of 1952, the president is also the Supreme Commander of the Armed Forces and head of the executive branch of the Egyptian government.

As it is the supreme magistracy of the country, the presidency is the highest office in Egypt. The powers, functions and duties of prior presidential offices, in addition to their relation with the prime minister and government of Egypt, have varied over time across different constitutional documents.

Six presidents have assumed the presidency of Egypt after the abolition of the monarchy in 1953, with several short transitional periods. The first was Mohamed Naguib, followed by Gamal Abdel Nasser and Anwar Sadat. Following Sadat's assassination came Hosni Mubarak, and then Mohamed Morsi. The current president is Abdel Fattah el-Sisi, who has been in office since June 8, 2014.

== History ==
The first president of Egypt was Mohamed Naguib, who, along with Gamal Abdel Nasser, led the Egyptian Revolution of 1952 that overthrew King Farouk and marked the end of British colonial rule. Though Farouk's infant son was formally declared by the revolutionaries as King Fuad II, all effective executive power was vested in Naguib and the Revolutionary Command Council. On 18 June 1953, just under a year after the coup d'état, the Council abolished the monarchy of Egypt and Sudan, and declared Egypt a republic, with Mohamed Naguib as its president.

Naguib resigned as president in November 1954, following a severe rift with the younger military officers who had participated with him in the revolution. Thereafter, the office of president remained vacant until January 1956, when Gamal Abdel Nasser was elected as president via a plebiscite. Nasser would remain as president of Egypt, as well as president of the United Arab Republic, which lasted from 1958 to 1971, until his sudden death in September 1970 at the age of 52.

Nasser was succeeded by his vice president, Anwar Sadat, who was elected by plebiscite in October 1970. Sadat served as president until his assassination in October 1981, and shared the Nobel Peace Prize with Israeli prime minister Menachem Begin in 1978 for initiating peace talks between the two countries. He was succeeded by his vice president, Hosni Mubarak, who was elected president by plebiscite and remained so for nearly 30 years.

In the Egyptian Revolution of 2011, Mubarak, who held office from 14 October 1981 until 11 February 2011, was forced to resign following mass nationwide protests demanding his removal from office. On 10 February 2011 Mubarak transferred presidential powers to his recently appointed vice president, Omar Suleiman. Suleiman's wielding of presidential powers was a momentary formality, as the position of president of Egypt was then officially vacated, and the Supreme Council of the Armed Forces, led by Field Marshal Mohamed Hussein Tantawi, assumed executive control of the state.

On 30 June 2012, the Muslim Brotherhood-affiliated Mohamed Morsi was sworn in as President of Egypt, having won the 2012 Egyptian presidential election on 24 June; he was the first president to gain power solely through an election via popular vote. However, Morsi's presidency was short-lived, and slightly more than a year later on 3 July 2013 he was removed from office following mass protests against his rule.

Abdel Fattah el-Sisi, who served as Defense Minister under Morsi's presidency and retained his post after Morsi's removal from office, permanently retired from the Egyptian Armed Forces in 2014 and then went on to win the 2014 presidential election, being sworn in as president on 8 June 2014. He was later re-elected to a second term in 2018 after winning the 2018 presidential election. In April 2019, Egypt's parliament extended presidential terms from four to six years. President Abdel Fattah al-Sisi was also allowed to run for third term in next election in 2024. In December 2023, President al-Sisi won the 2023 presidential election for a third term in office. He was inaugurated in April 2024.

=== Old electoral system ===
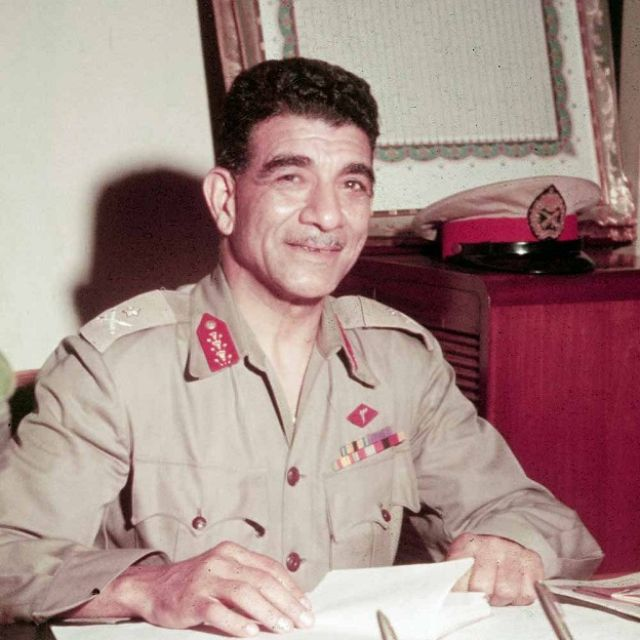
Mohamed Naguib, the first president of Egypt

The Egyptian Constitution has had various forms since the establishment of the republic in 1953. In all iterations of the republican constitution until 2005, the method of electing the president is based on that of the French Fifth Republic. Both the pre-revolution Egyptian Civil Code, and the semi-presidential system of government adopted after the revolution were strongly influenced by the legal and political tradition of France. In this two-stage system, the Egyptian legislature, the National Assembly (a name also inspired by its French counterpart), nominates one of a number of candidates for the presidency.

A candidate needs at least a two-thirds majority in the Assembly in order to win the nomination. In the second stage, the candidate is confirmed in office by popular plebiscite of all eligible voters in the country. Egypt maintained this system even after it was abandoned by France in 1962 in Favour of direct presidential elections, eliminating the role of the legislature in the election of the French president. In the Egyptian Constitution of 1971, the name of the National Assembly was changed to the People's Assembly.

=== 2005 and 2007 constitutional amendments ===
In 2005 and 2007, constitutional amendments were made. Principles in the amended constitution include:

- Election of the president of the republic by direct secret ballot by citizens who have the right to vote.
- Ensuring that multiple candidates be put forward for the people to choose from.
- Ensuring the credibility of the nomination process.
- Providing the opportunity for political parties to put forward one of their leaders to contest the first presidential elections to be held in light of the amendment.
- The establishment of a presidential election commission that would enjoy complete independence to supervise the election process.
- Ensuring judicial supervision over the voting process.

The following provisions regarding the election process are stipulated in Article 76 as amended:

- A successful candidate must be elected by the majority of the votes. If no candidate attains such a majority, elections will be repeated after at least seven days between the two candidates having the highest votes. In case of a tie between the candidate who attained the second highest votes and a third candidate, the third candidate shall participate in the second round. The candidate who receives the highest votes in the second round shall be declared president.
- The amendment also provides that a law will be passed to regulate the relevant election procedures. This law is expected to regulate the various aspects of the election process itself, including campaign funding, equal access to the media, and guarantees of fair competition.
- As required by the amendment, the law will be submitted to the Supreme Constitutional Court to opine on its constitutionality. This establishes an important precedent in Egypt's legal tradition, by which the Supreme Constitutional Court shall have the right of prior review of national legislation to decide on its compatibility with the Constitution. This differs from the practice thus far by which the review process undertaken by the Court on national legislation was done by judicial review subsequent to the passage of legislation.

== Presidential powers ==
Under the system created by the 1980, 2003 and 2007 constitutional amendments to the 1971 Constitution, the President is the pre-eminent executive figure, who names the Prime Minister of Egypt as well as appoints the Cabinet per the latter's recommendation, while in reality, he was the head of both the state and of the government, as well as being the top foreign policy maker and holding supreme command over the military. During martial law, the President also appoints deans of faculties and majors, and can also enlist or oust people in the private sector. The President then also has the power to issue regulations for the enforcement of laws, ensuring proper public services, etc., which have been transferred to the Prime Minister under the 2012 and 2014 Constitutions. Egypt had been under martial law since 1981. After the Egyptian revolution in 2011 that ousted the 30-year regime of then President Hosni Mubarak, the martial law was temporarily suspended.

The 2012 Constitution provided for a semi-presidential form of government in which the president shares executive powers with the prime minister, until it was suspended following Morsi's removal from office. This structure was retained by the 2014 Constitution, which was drafted following Morsi's ousting and came into effect after a referendum in 2014.

Under the present 2014 Constitution, the president is the head of state as well as that of the executive. The president lays down, along with the prime minister and the cabinet, the state's general policy and oversees its implementation. The president represents Egypt in foreign relations and has the power to ratify treaties, can issue decrees having the force of law when the House of Representatives is in recess, and such decrees are subject to approval by the House after resuming its sessions at the end of the recess, and acts as the supreme commander of the armed forces. The president also has the power of pardon and can exercise necessary powers in times of emergency.

== Presidential Councils ==
The following is a list of presidential councils under the auspices of the President of Egypt:

- National Defense Council
- National Payments Council
- National Security Council
- Supreme Council for Peaceful Uses of Nuclear Energy
- Advisory Council of Egyptian Scientists and Expert
- Egyptian Health Council
- Supreme Council for Combating Terrorism
- Supreme Council for Investment
- Grand Egyptian Museum Board of Trustees
- Economic Development Council
- Education and Scientific Research Council
- Foreign Policy and National Security Council
- Community Development Council
- Supreme Council for Exports

== Election ==
Election procedures are taken within sixty days before the end of the incumbent president's term.

=== Requirements and candidacy ===
Article 141 of the Egyptian Constitution establishes the requirements one must meet in order to become president. They must be an Egyptian citizen, be born to Egyptian parents (never having dual nationality), have participated in the military or been exempted from it, and cannot be less than forty years old.

Additional requirements were provisioned in Article 142 of the Egyptian constitution concerning candidates for the president's office. Candidates must have the recommendation of 20 members of the House of Representatives or the endorsement of 25,000 people across 15 governorates, with at least 1,000 signatures from each.

=== Presidential Election Commission ===
The amendment to Article 76 of the constitution provides for the establishment of a "Presidential Election Commission" that would have complete independence and would be charged with the supervision of the presidential election process.

The commission is composed of ten members, presided by the chief justice of the Supreme Constitutional Court and four other ex officio members of the judiciary who are the most senior serving deputy president of each of the Supreme Constitutional, the Court of Cassation, and the High Administrative Court, and the president of the Cairo Court of Appeal.

The rest of the commission is made up from five independent and neutral public figures: three to be selected by the People's Assembly and two to be selected by the Shoura Council.

Decisions of this Committee shall be passed by a majority of seven votes. This commission has a term of five years and is exclusively competent to supervise the presidential election process, including accepting nominations, announcing the names of accepted candidates, supervision of election procedures, vote counting and announcement of the results.

It also has final judicial competence to rule on any contesting or challenge submitted in relation to the presidential elections, and its decisions are final and subject to no appeal. The committee may issue its own regulations and shall be competent to establish general sub-committees from among members of the judiciary, to monitor the various phases of the election process, under its supervision. The election process shall be completed in one day.

== Inauguration and oath of office ==
In accordance with Article 79 of the constitution, the president must take the following oath or affirmation before exercising his functions:

"I swear by God the Almighty to sincerely maintain the Republican system, to respect the Constitution and law, to fully care about the interests of the people, and to maintain the independence and territorial integrity of the Homeland."

== Term(s) of office ==
Under the previous Constitution, the president served for a term of four years. The president is limited to two terms, whether the terms are successive or separated.

On 14 February 2019, the Egyptian parliament voted overwhelmingly to approve draft amendments to the country's 2014 constitution; among other things, these amendments extend the duration of presidential terms from four years to six years, and allow incumbent president Abdel Fattah el-Sisi to extend his current term to the 6 year length, as well as serve a third and final term, exempting him from the two-term limit that otherwise applies to the office of president. These amendments were subsequently ratified in the 2019 Egyptian constitutional referendum.

During their tenure in office, the president is not allowed to be a formal member of a political party.

If the president-elect is announced before the end of the incumbent president's term, the incumbent president continues in office until the end of their term.

== Succession ==
In the case of temporary incapacitation of the president, the constitution provides the president to relinquish his powers to the vice president or the prime minister. However, the person who takes office is limited in power as the new president cannot dissolve the parliament, propose constitutional amendments or remove the cabinet from office.

In case of the vacancy of the presidential office or the permanent incapacitation of the President, the Speaker of the People's Assembly shall temporarily assume the presidency. In case the People's Assembly is dissolved at such a time, the President of the Supreme Constitutional Court shall take over the presidency on condition that neither shall nominate themselves for the presidency. Both are also limited in power as in they cannot dissolve the parliament, remove the cabinet, or propose constitutional amendments.

The People's Assembly shall then proclaim the vacancy of the office of president, and a new president shall be chosen within a maximum period of sixty days from the date of the vacancy of the office.

Although, the constitution does not directly stipulate any role for the vice president in the process of presidential succession, it had become a tradition for the People's Assembly to nominate a vice president for the vacant office of the president. Both Anwar Sadat and Hosni Mubarak served as vice-presidents at the time the presidential office became vacant; however, on Mubarak's succession in 1981 as president, he did not appoint a vice-president until 29 January 2011, when during substantial protests demanding reforms, he appointed Omar Suleiman to the role.

=== Resignation ===
The president may resign by delivering their resignation to the People's Assembly under the 2012 and 2014 Constitutions.

Gamal Abdel Nasser submitted his resignation after the overwhelming Egyptian defeat in the Six-Day War, before retracting it following mass demonstrations from the Egyptian public. President Mubarak also resigned on 11 February 2011 during mass protests against his regime.

== Official residences ==
The presidency in Egypt operates eight presidential residences in addition to other presidential guest houses. The official residence and office of the president is Heliopolis Palace in Heliopolis, Cairo. Other presidential palaces include:

- Abdeen Palace, in Old Cairo;
- Koubbeh Palace, in Cairo;
- Ras Al-Teen Palace, in Alexandria;
- Montaza Palace, in Montaza, Alexandria;
- Al-Tahra Palace, in Cairo;
- Al-Oroba Palace, in Cairo.

== See also ==
- List of heads of state of Egypt
- Prime Minister of Egypt
