= Khedivate of Egypt =

1867–1914 monarchy of Egypt

Coordinates: 30°03′N 31°13′E

Khedivate of Egypt الخديوية المصرية (Arabic) Hıdiviyet-i Mısır (Ottoman Turkish)
- 1867–1914
- Flag (1867–1914) Coat of arms
- Anthem: (1871–1914) سلام أفندينا; Salam Affandina "Salute of Our Lord"
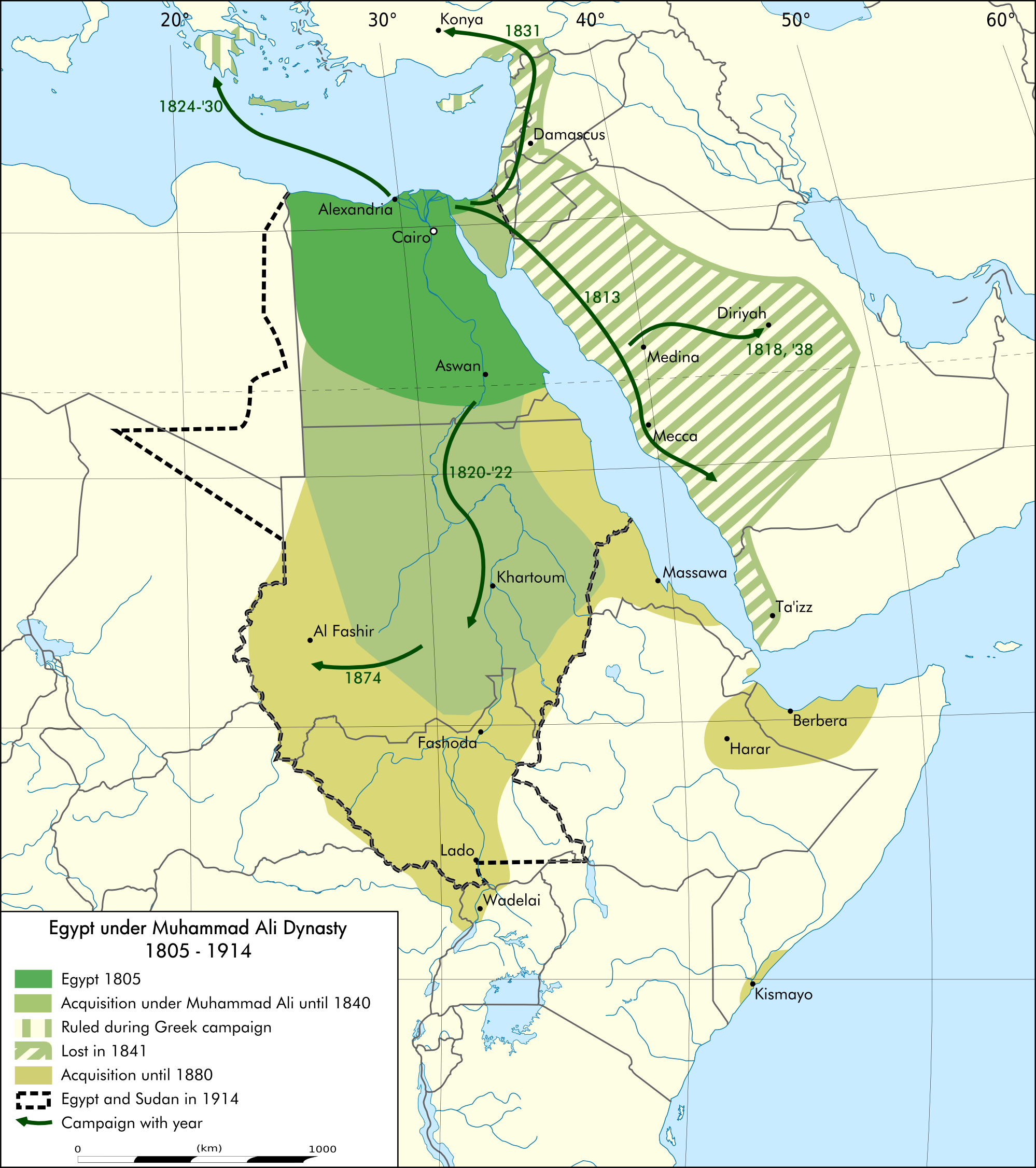
- Egypt and its expansion in the 19th century.
- Status: Largely independent vassal state of the Ottoman Empire: under British occupation from 1882 onwards
- Capital: Cairo
- Common languages: Arabic, Ottoman Turkish, Albanian, Greek, French, English^{[a]}
- Religion: Sunni Islam (official), Coptic Christianity (minority)
- Government: Constitutional monarchy
- Khedive
  - 1867–1879: Isma'il Pasha
  - 1879–1892: Tewfik Pasha
  - 1892–1914: Abbas II
- British Consul-General
  - 1883–1907: Evelyn Baring
  - 1907–1911: Eldon Gorst
  - 1911–1914: Herbert Kitchener
- Prime Minister
  - 1878–1879 (first): Nubar Pasha
  - 1914 (last): Hussein Roshdy Pasha
- Historical era: Scramble for Africa
  - Established: 8 June 1867
  - Suez Canal opened: 17 November 1869
  - Urabi revolt: 1881–1882
  - British invasion in the Anglo-Egyptian War: July – September 1882
  - Sudan Convention: 18 January 1899
  - Disestablished: 19 December 1914

Area
  - Total: 5,000,000 km^{2} (1,900,000 sq mi)

Population
  - 1882^{[b]}: 6,805,000
  - 1897^{[b]}: 9,715,000
  - 1907^{[b]}: 11,287,000
- Currency: Egyptian pound
Preceded by
Egypt Eyalet
Sultanate of Darfur
Ottoman Empire
Succeeded by
Sultanate of Egypt
Mahdist Sudan
Isaaq Sultanate
- a. English became the sole official language in 1898. b. Area and density include inhabited areas only. The total area of Egypt, including deserts, is 994,000 km^{2}, however, the size of the Khedivate of Egypt consisted many other territories, and was approximately 5,000,000 km^{2}.

The Khedivate of Egypt (Note: Arabic: الخديويه المصريه or خديوية مصر (Egyptian Arabic pronunciation: [xedeˈwejjet mɑsˤɾ]); Ottoman Turkish: Hıdiviyet-i Mısır.) was an Egyptian state established and ruled by members of the dynasty of Muhammad Ali. It was considered an autonomous tributary state of the Ottoman Empire. Following the defeat and expulsion of Napoleon's forces from Egypt in 1801, and then the Oriental Crisis of 1840, Muhammad Ali and his successors had already ruled Ottoman Egypt with a significant degree of autonomy. In 1867, the Ottoman sultan granted Muhammad Ali's grandson, Isma'il Pasha (r. 1863–1879), the title of Khedive along with near-total autonomy over internal affairs, certain diplomatic privileges, and the order of succession.

Isma'il and his successors continued the trend initiated by Muhammad Ali to reform and modernise the Egyptian state, following the example of European nations. Among the major projects of this era was the completion of the Suez Canal, which opened in 1869. Egypt's territorial control and sphere of influence was also expanded along the Red Sea and in northeastern Africa, reaching its limit when Isma'il attempted to take control of Equatoria and suffering reversals in Sudan after the outbreak of the Mahdist revolution in 1881.

The Khedives' reform projects were costly and incurred serious foreign debts, which in turn allowed the European powers to increase their influence over Egyptian affairs. Nationalist Egyptian sentiment developed in opposition to this and led to the Urabi revolution, which occurred between 1879 and 1882 during the reign of Isma'il's successor, Tawfiq Pasha (r. 1879–1892). The revolution was suppressed when the British invaded and took control of Egypt in 1882. In 1914, the formal connection to the Ottoman Empire was ended and Britain unilaterally established a protectorate called the Sultanate of Egypt.

== History ==
=== Background: rule of Muhammad Ali and his successors ===
Ottoman Egypt was invaded by the French army led by Napoleon Bonaparte in 1798. The French army in the region was later defeated and surrendered in 1801. In the chaotic years that followed, an Ottoman officer named Muhammad Ali rose to power and was recognized as Ottoman governor of Egypt from 1805 to 1848. During this time, he eliminated other factions that competed for power in Egypt, most notably with the massacre of the Mamluks in 1811. He established de facto autonomy from the Ottoman sultan and in various campaigns expanded his control to Sudan, the Arabian Peninsula, and Syria By 1841 he was forced to withdraw from Syria and recognize the authority of the Ottoman Empire, but he retained control of his Sudanese territories. The Ottoman sultan also recognized him as viceroy of Egypt and accepted the right of his descendants to retain that office, thus establishing a new dynastic rule over Egypt. During his reign he also embarked on an ambitious program of reforms and modernisation in Egypt, largely by emulating Western Europe, including the enlistment of European advisers.

As old age was overtaking him, Muhammad Ali was succeeded by his son, Ibrahim Pasha, in 1848. Ibrahim died about two months later and was succeeded by a grandson of Muhammad Ali, Abbas I. Abbas I was killed in 1854 and succeeded by another son of Muhammad Ali, Muhammad Sa'id. Upon the latter's death in 1863, a son of Ibrahim Pasha, Isma'il Pasha, took the throne. These successors to Muhammad Ali continued some of his modernisation efforts but also, in the process, opened Egypt to European influence and increased its dependence on foreign loans.

=== Reign of Khedive Isma'il ===
Isma'il had completed some of his education in Paris and had already acquired governing experience in various positions under his predecessors. During his reign, he undertook even more ambitious projects to modernise Egypt along a European model. He also sought to expand Egypt's autonomy from the Ottoman sultan by seeking favor from both the sultan and from European powers.

Isma'il also sought to reform the state to formally resemble a modern constitutional monarchy. On 25 November 1866, he inaugurated the Consultative Chamber of Delegates (Majlis Shūrā al-Nuwwāb) made up of 75 elected members who met once a year.

Isma'il did not obtain independence from the Ottoman Empire but did persuade the Ottoman sultan, Abdulaziz (r. 1861–1876), to grant him the title of khedive (a term of Persian origin), declared by a firman on 8 June 1867. This title distinguished him from other Ottoman governors (walis). The sultan granted him near complete control over Egypt's internal affairs, as well as the right to negotiate international agreements on certain issues. In return for doubling his tributary payments to Istanbul, Isma'il also won the right to change the order of succession to primogeniture. In another firman on 8 June 1873, the sultan further granted him the right to take foreign loans and removed restrictions on the size of Egypt's military.

By Isma'il's reign, the Egyptian government, headed by the minister Nubar Pasha, had become dependent on Britain and France for a healthy economy. Isma'il attempted to end this European dominance, while at the same time pursuing an aggressive domestic policy. Under Isma'il, 112 canals and 400 bridges were built in Egypt.

Because of his efforts to gain economic independence from the European powers, Isma'il became unpopular with many British and French diplomats, including Evelyn Baring and Alfred Milner, who claimed that he was "ruining Egypt."

In 1869, the completion of the Suez Canal gave Britain a faster route to India. This made Egypt increasingly reliant on Britain for both military and economic aid. Isma'il made no effort to reconcile with the European powers, who pressured the Ottoman sultan into removing him from power.

==== War with Ethiopia ====
Isma'il dreamt of expanding his realm across the entire Nile including its diverse sources, and over the whole African coast of the Red Sea. This, together with rumours about rich raw material and fertile soil, led Isma'il to expansionist policies directed against the Ethiopian Empire under Yohannes IV. In 1865, the Ottoman Sublime Porte ceded Habesh Eyalet to Isma'il, with Massawa and Suakin at the Red Sea as the main cities of that province. This province, which neighboured Ethiopia, first consisted of a coastal strip but expanded subsequently inland into territory controlled by the Ethiopian emperor. Here Isma'il occupied regions originally claimed by the Ottomans when they had established the Habesh Eyalet in the 16th century.

New economically promising projects, like huge cotton plantations in the Barka delta, were started. In 1872, Bogos (with the city of Keren) was annexed by the governor of the new "Province of Eastern Sudan and the Red Sea Coast", Werner Munzinger Pasha. In October 1875 Isma'il's army tried to occupy the adjacent highlands of Hamasien, which were then tributary to the Ethiopian Emperor, and suffered defeat at the Battle of Gundet.

In March 1876, Isma'il's army tried again and suffered a second dramatic defeat by Yohannes' army in the Battle of Gura. Isma'il's son Hassan was captured by the Ethiopians and only released after a large ransom. This was followed by a long cold war, only finishing in 1884 with the Anglo-Egyptian-Ethiopian Hewett Treaty, when Bogos was given back to Ethiopia. The Red Sea Province created by Isma'il and his governor Munzinger Pasha was taken over by the Kingdom of Italy shortly thereafter and became the territorial basis for the Colony of Eritrea (proclaimed in 1890).

==== Invasion of East Africa ====
In 1866, the Egyptians occupied the Emirate of Harar. In 1874, Isma'il Pasha ordered the deputation of warships to patrol Tadjoura whereafter for ten years, the Khedivate was established from Zeila to Berbera. The Egyptian control over the region had started to cause concern for the Sultanate of Zanzibar however Egyptians withdrew in April 1884 following their failed attempt to establish themselves beyond Berbera and the eastern littoral of Somalia.

=== Deposition of Isma'il ===
The penetration of European powers in Egypt increased in the 1870s as Isma'il was forced to appoint European ministers in his government. At the same time, public Egyptian sentiment against European influence grew. In April 1879, a coalition of military and civilian factions signed a "statement of national demands" (al-lā'iḥa al-waṭaniyya) which emboldened Isma'il to dismiss the European ministers and appoint a new national government. This provoked a diplomatic crisis that resulted with the Ottoman sultan deposing Isma'il and appointing his son Tawfiq as the new Khedive on 29 June 1879.

Under Tawfiq, foreign influence on the Egyptian state was re-imposed, although without European ministers. A law was passed on 17 July 1880 that determined Egypt's total debt to foreign creditors to be 98,378,000 pounds and diverted half the state's revenues to repaying it. This put further pressure on the state to tax wealthy landowners and enact other reforms.

=== Revolt and British intervention ===
In response to the new government, tensions and opposition rose again from multiple factions. In January 1881, a confrontation escalated between the native Egyptian officers of the army and the Minister of War, who was part of the old Turco-Circassian elite that was still attached to the ruling dynasty. The Khedive was forced to appoint a new Minister of War, but the officers' movement grew stronger under a new leader, Colonel Ahmed Urabi, in alliance with rural elites. The army protested in front of the Khedive's palace in September 1881, forcing the Khedive to dismiss his prime minister, Mustafa Riyad Pasha, and to appoint a new government with Muhammad Sharif Pasha as prime minister. By February 1882, Urabi was also appointed Minister of War.

A new constitution, the Egyptian Fundamental Ordinance of 1882, was proclaimed, following up on the abortive attempt to promulgate a constitution in 1879. The document was limited in scope and was effectively more of an organic law of the Consultative Council to the khedive than an actual constitution.

In April 1882, France and Great Britain sent warships to Alexandria to bolster the Khedive amidst this turbulent climate, spreading fear of invasion throughout the country. British naval forces shelled and captured Alexandria, and an expeditionary force under General Sir Garnet Wolseley was formed in England. The British army landed in Egypt soon afterwards and defeated Urabi's army in the Battle of Tel el-Kebir. Urabi was tried for treason and sentenced to death, but the sentence was commuted to exile. After the revolt, the Egyptian army was reorganized on a British model and commanded by British officers.

By June Egypt was in the hands of nationalists opposed to European domination of the country. A British naval bombardment of Alexandria had little effect on the opposition which led to the landing of a British expeditionary force at both ends of the Suez Canal in August 1882. The British succeeded in defeating the Egyptian Army at Tel El Kebir in September and took control of the country putting Tewfiq back in control. The purpose of the invasion had been to restore political stability to Egypt under a government of the Khedive and international controls which were in place to streamline Egyptian financing since 1876.

=== British occupation ===
==== Loss and reconquest of Sudan ====
Meanwhile, a religious rebellion had broken out in the Sudan, led by Muhammad Ahmed, who proclaimed himself the Mahdi. The Mahdist rebels had seized the regional capital of Kordofan and annihilated two British-led expeditions sent to quell it. The British soldier-adventurer Charles George Gordon, an ex-governor of the Sudan, was sent to the Sudanese capital, Khartoum, with orders to evacuate its minority of European and Egyptian inhabitants. Instead of evacuating the city, Gordon prepared for a siege and held out from 1884 to 1885. However, Khartoum eventually fell, and he was killed.

The British Gordon Relief Expedition was delayed by several battles and was thus unable to reach Khartoum and save Gordon. The fall of Khartoum resulted in the proclamation of an Islamic state, ruled over first by the Mahdi and then by his successor Khalifa Abdullahi.

In 1896, during the reign of Tewfik's son, Abbas II, a massive Anglo-Egyptian force, under the command of General Herbert Kitchener, began the conquest of the Sudan not long after the death of the Mahdi, Muhammad Ahmad, to typhus. The Mahdists were defeated in the battles of Abu Hamed and Atbara. The campaign was concluded with the Anglo-Egyptian victory in the Battle of Omdurman, the Mahdist capital.

Caliph Abdallahi ibn Muhammad was hunted down and killed in 1899 in the Battle of Umm Diwaykarat, and Anglo-Egyptian rule was restored to the Sudan.

==== End of the Khedivate ====
Abbas II became very hostile to the British as his reign drew on, and, by 1911, was considered by Lord Kitchener to be a "wicked little Khedive" worthy of deposition.

In 1914, when World War I broke out, the Ottoman Empire joined the Central Powers against Britain and France. Britain now removed the nominal role of Constantinople, proclaimed a Sultanate of Egypt and abolished the Khedivate on 5 November 1914. Abbas II, who supported the Central Powers and was in Vienna for a state visit, was deposed from the Khedivate throne in his absence by the enforcement of the British military authorities in Cairo and was banned from returning to Egypt. He was succeeded by his uncle Hussein Kamel, who took the title of Sultan on 19 December 1914.

== Economy ==
=== Currency ===
During the Khedivate, the standard form of Egyptian currency was the Egyptian pound. Because of the gradual European domination of the Egyptian economy, the Khedivate adopted the gold standard in 1885.

=== Adoption of European-style industries ===
Although the adoption of modern, Western industrial techniques was begun under Muhammad Ali in the early 19th century, the policy was continued under the Khedives.

Machines were imported into Egypt and by the abolition of the Khedivate in 1914, the textile industry had become the most prominent one in the nation.

== Military ==
In 1877 the Egyptian military contained:

- 58 infantry battalions (organised into 18 regiments and 4 independent battalions)
- 10 independent Nubian Rifle companies
- 24 Cavalry squadrons (organised into 4 regiments)
- 1 Sapper battalion
- 24 field artillery batteries (organised into 2 regiments) with 144 guns primarily of the La Hitte system
- 3 regiments of Fortress artillery with 276 guns

This amounted to 58,000 troops in the regular army; there were also 5,000 military and municipal police and various other irregular formations.

== List of rulers ==
Autonomous governors of Egypt (as wali until 1867):

- Muhammad Ali (1805–1848): first hereditary Ottoman governor of Egypt.
- Ibrahim (1848): Muhammad Ali's son.
- Abbas Hilmi I (1848–1854): Muhammad Ali's grandson.
- Muhammad Sa'id (1854–1863): Muhammad Ali's son.

Khedives of Egypt (title used from 1867 to 1914):

- Isma'il (1863–1879): Son of Ibrahim, first khedive of Egypt in 1867, deposed in 1879.
- Muhammad Tawfiq (1879–1892): Son of Isma'il, second khedive, continued to reign after British invasion of 1882.
- Abbas Hilmi II (1892–1914): Son of Tawfiq, third and last khedive, deposed by the British in 1914.

Subsequent rulers under other titles:

- Husayn Kamil (1914–1917): Son of Isma'il, installed as first "Sultan" of Egypt under British protectorate.
- Ahmad Fu'ad I (1917–1936): Son of Isma'il, first to assume title of "King" in 1922.
- Faruk (1936–1952): Son of Fu'ad I, forced to abdicate in 1952 Revolution.
- Ahmad Fu'ad II (1952–1953): Son of Faruk, last king of Egypt, installed as nominal monarch briefly until abolishment of the monarchy in June 1953.

== See also ==
- Cretan revolt (1866–1869)
- Serbian–Ottoman Wars (1876–1878)
