= Syrian Provisional Constitution of 1961 =

Provisional Constitution of the Syrian Arab Republic

Overview
- Original title: الدستور المؤقت للجمهورية العربية السورية
- Jurisdiction: Second Syrian Republic
- Presented: 12 November 1961
- Ratified: 5 December 1961
- Date effective: 5 December 1961
- System: Transitional

Government structure
- Branches: Three (executive, legislative and judiciary)
- Head of state: President
- Chambers: Unicameral (Constituent and Parliamentary Assembly)
- Executive: President-led Council of Ministers responsible to the Chamber of Deputies; Prime Minister as head of government
- Judiciary: Judiciary of Syria
- Federalism: Unitary
- First legislature: December 12, 1961
- Repealed: 13 September 1962
- Supersedes: Provisional Constitution of the UAR
- Superseded by: Constitution of 1962

Full text
- Provisional Constitution of Syria (1961) at Wikisource
- الدستور المؤقت للجمهورية العربية السورية at Arabic Wikisource

The Syrian Provisional Constitution of 1961 was adopted following the 1961 coup and Syria's secession from the United Arab Republic. Consisting of only eight articles, the provisional constitution sought to temporarily organise the political system in Syria until the adoption a permanent constitution by the Constituent and Parliamentary Assembly. The Provisional Constitution is the first constitutional document to adopt the Syrian Arab Republic as Syria's official name instead of the Syrian Republic, the pre-1958 name.
