= Egyptian Constitution of 1923 =

The Constitution of 1923 was the main constitution of Egypt from 1923–1952. It was replaced by the Constitution of 1930 for a 5-year period from October 1930 before being restored in December 1935. It adopted the parliamentary representative system based on separation of and cooperation among authorities. The Parliament of Egypt was a bicameral system made up of the Senate and the Chamber of Deputies. It was suspended following the 1952 Egyptian Revolution.

== History ==
After World War I, the former deputy speaker of the wartime suspended 1913 Legislative Assembly Sa'ad Zaghloul asked the High Commissioner in Cairo, Reginald Wingate, permission to visit London to negotiate the political status of post-war Egypt. When the British refused, Zaghloul formed a delegation - the Arabic word being Wafd - with other Egyptian nationalists with the hope of securing independence at the Paris Peace Conference. In response, the British arrested Zaghloul and four other Wafdists, and deported them to Malta. This sparked the 1919 Egyptian Revolution, as the Egyptian masses revolted against the British and in favor of the Wafd. This set the stage for negotiations between the Egyptian nationalists and British officials over the status of Egypt. The negotiations between Alfred Milner and Zaghloul began on 9 June 1920. Before negotiations collapsed, Milner proposed a memorandum on 18 August, whereby Britain would respect the independence of Egypt as a constitutional monarchy, with stipulations that safeguarded British interests. While Milner did not believe that Egypt was ready to govern itself, one explanation for why he suggested a constitutional government was to bring Egyptian liberals to the negotiating table. Rounds of negotiations between Egyptian nationalists and British officials, continued until the Unilateral Declaration of Egyptian Independence in 1922. In this period, local Egyptian politics were divided between Wafdists who supported Zaghloul and the Liberal Constitutionalists who supported Adly Yakan.

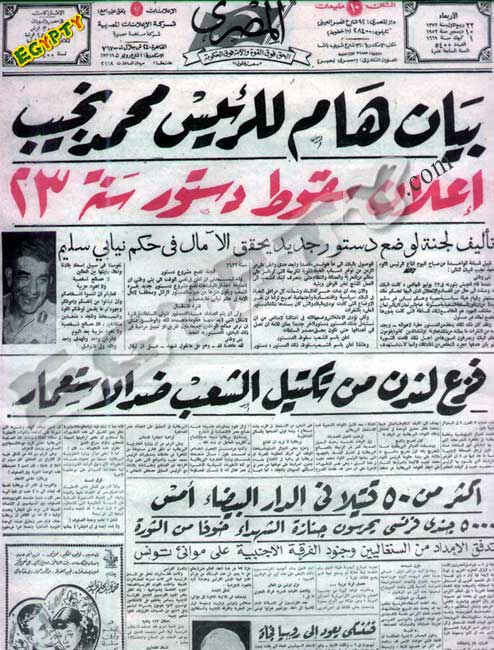
Cancelling of the Egyptian Constitution of 1923 in 1952

Based on its new status, Egypt needed a constitution. King Fuad appointed Abdel Khalek Tharwat prime minister on 1 March 1922 with the goal of writing a new constitution. On 2 April, the council of ministers approved his memorandum to set up a 30-member constitutional committee, presided over by Husayn Rushdi Pasha and included four ex-ministers, nine members of the former legislative assembly, the head of the sufi orders, an ex-mufti of Egypt. five Copts including the bishop of Alexandria, one Jew, as well as other politicians such as Muhammad Ali Alluba, Mohammed Hussein Heikal and Aly Maher. The Wafd, the most popular political movement in the country refused to participate in the commission. (Note: For two announced reasons: it was not offered enough seats on the committee and it preferred that the constitution be drafted by an elected constituent Assembly.) The draft constitution was a comprise between King Fuad's power for a strong monarchy and members of the commission who preferred a more limited constitutional monarchy with a strong assembly. The draft stated that the king, who was the head of the executive, had a limited veto over parliament, as well as the right to dissolve parliament and appointed and dismiss ministers. Despite Allenby's misgivings, the document also referred to King Fuad as "king of Egypt and the Sudan". However, following Tharwat's resignation, Allenby was able to secure a declaration by King Fuad to give up this title, causing Tharwat's successor, Mohamed Tawfik Naseem, to resign and succeeded by Yahya Ibrahim. After heavy discussions on the constitution, until the King promulgated it on 19 April 1923. However, this document differed from the draft, such as giving the king the power to confer civil and military rank, decorations and titles, to appoint and dismiss military officers and diplomats, as well as increasing the proportion of monarch appointed senators and give the king to power to appoint the president of senate. The structure and contents of the constitution were heavily inspired by the Belgian constitution of 1831. However, there are major differences. For example, the Egyptian constitution that the king can veto bills that parliament passes and can pass laws, royal decrees, when parliament in on recess.

== Characteristics ==
The parliamentary representative system that was adopted ensured that the relationship between the executive and the legislature was based on the principle of control and balance of powers. It made the Cabinet accountable to the parliament, which had the right to move no confidence vote, while giving the King the right to dissolve parliament. However, it gave the parliament the right to convene in case it was not called to sit according to the scheduled date.

As for the Chamber of Deputies, the constitution stated that all its members were to be elected for a 5-year term. On the other hand, three fifths of the Senate members were elected, and the rest were appointed. The constitution also adopted the principle of equal competences for the two branches, with some exceptions.

The number of members was increased from time to time. The Chamber of Deputies, for example, had 214 members from 1924–1930, then it increased to 235. The number decreased under the 1930 Constitution which continued in effect from 1931–1934 to become 150. It increased once again under the 1923 Constitution to become 232 for the period from 1936–1938. Then the number of members became 264 from 1938–1949. Then it was increased to 319 in 1950 and continued as such up until the Egyptian Revolution of 1952.

The parliament established by the Constitution of 1923 was an advanced step along the course of democracy and representation in Egypt. However, in practice it was mixed with numerous negative aspects. Political life from 1923–1952 varied between tides of limited popular democracy and ebbs due to intervention by occupation forces and the palace, which led to the dissolution of parliament ten times. Moreover, a new constitution was issued in 1930 which lasted for five years. This was a setback to democratic life until the Constitution of 1923 was restored in 1935.

Thus, constitutional conditions deteriorated due to both internal and external reasons. This deterioration was reflected in a state of political and governmental instability to the extent that Egypt had 40 cabinets in the period 1923–1952.

== Sources ==
- Al-Sayyid-Marsot, Afaf Lutfi (1977). Egypt's Liberal Experiment: 1922–1936. University of California Press. ISBN 9780520031098.
- Barker, Carol Mae (1964). The Egyptian Constitution of 1923: A Case Study of Constitutionalism in Developing Nations (Thesis). Radcliffe College.
- Bentwich, Norman (1924). "The Constitution of Egypt". Journal of Comparative Legislation and International Law. 6 (1): 41–49. ISSN 1479-5949. JSTOR 753079.
- Deeb, Marius (1979). Party Politics in Egypt: the Wafd & its rivals 1919–1939. Ithaca Press. ISBN 9780903729406.
- Gifford, Jayne (2020). Britain in Egypt: Egyptian Nationalism and Imperial Strategy, 1919-1931. Bloomsbury Publishing. ISBN 9781838604950.
- Hiroshi, Marsumoto (2009). "The Introduction of Democracy and Conflict in Modern Egypt: The Constitution of 1923" (PDF). In Tsugitaka, Sato (ed.). Development of Parliamentarism in the Modern Islamic World. Toyo Bunko. ISBN 9784809702273.
- Kedourie, Elie (1968). "The genesis of the Egyptian constitution of 1923". In Holt, P. M. (ed.). Political and Social Change in Egypt in Modern Egypt. Oxford University Press.
- Ikeda, Misako (2022). "Independence and constitutionalism in Egypt 1919–1922". International Journal of Asian Studies. 20 (2): 385–401. doi:10.1017/s1479591422000213.
- Landau, Jacob (1948). "The New Constitution and the 1924 Parilament". Parliamentary institutions and political parties in Egypt, 1866-1924 (Thesis). SOAS University of London. doi:10.25501/SOAS.00029089.
- Long, C. W. R. (2004). British Pro-Consuls in Egypt, 1914-1929: The Challenge of Nationalism. Routledge. ISBN 9781134268344.
- Maghraoui, Abdeslam M. (2006). Liberalism without Democracy: Nationhood and Citizenship in Egypt, 1922–1936. Duke University Press.
- Maghraoui, Abdeslam (1991). The Dilemma of Liberalism in the Middle East: A Reading of the Liberal Experiment in Egypt 1920's-1930's (Thesis). Princeton.
- Shechter, Relli (2019). "The 1923 Egyptian Constitution – vision and ambivalence in the future of education in Egypt". History of Education. 48 (5): 630–645. doi:10.1080/0046760x.2019.1628312.
- Sivak-Reid, Kayla (2016). "Tracing a State and its Language from Province to Republic: Translations of Modern Egypt's Constitutions" Classical Mediterranean and Middle East Honors Projects. 22.

=== Primary Sources ===
- Khalil, Muhammad (1962). "Royal Order No. 42, of 1923, Establishing a Constitutional Regime for Egypt: The Egyptian Constitution of April 19, 1923". The Arab States and the Arab League: A Documentary Record. Vol. 1. Khayats. pp. 460–475.
