= Egyptian Constitution of 1971 =

Fundamental law of Egypt from 1971-2011

The Constitution of the Arab Republic of Egypt was the former constitution of Egypt. It was adopted on 11 September 1971 through a public referendum. It was later amended in 1980, 2005, and 2007. It was proclaimed to update the democratic representative system in assertion of the rule of law, independence of the judiciary, and party plurality. On 13 February 2011, the Constitution was suspended following the resignation of President Hosni Mubarak as a result of the 2011 Egyptian Revolution. On 30 March 2011, it was "effectively voided" after a new provisional constitution was passed by the country's ruling Supreme Council of the Armed Forces. It has since been superseded by the Egyptian Constitution of 2012 and the current Egyptian Constitution of 2014.

== History ==
In 1963, following the 1961 dissolution of the United Arab Republic of Egypt and Syria, President Gamal Abdel Nasser adopted another constitution for Egypt which continued to be known officially as the United Arab Republic. In 1971, when President Anwar Sadat took office, he moved for the adoption of a new democratic constitution that would allow more freedoms, a return of a more sound parliamentary life and correct democratic practice with the return of political parties and a bicameral parliamentary system.

The 1971 constitution was the fourth adopted constitution since the declaration of the republic and the country became known officially as the Arab Republic of Egypt. During its existence, the 1971 constitution was known as "The Permanent Egyptian Constitution", although after its ratification, it was amended three times by two presidents; the first being in 1980 by Sadat at the end of his presidency and the two other times by President Hosni Mubarak in both 2005 and early 2007. The last amendments were the most comprehensive with 34 articles of the constitution changed. These amendments were mainly proposed by the National Democratic Party to move the country's political and economic tendencies further away from socialism and more towards capitalism. Nonetheless, these amendments represented a clear response to opposition to the government in light of the 2005 elections with articles 5, 88 and 179 adding constitutional permanence to the emergency law in place since 1981.

In 2011, various political powers in Egypt asked for yet more reforms. Proponents of a more complete constitution intended to shape a more robust, variegated political and economic landscape in hopes of diversifying Egyptian political life, whether through more comprehensive amendments or through the adoption of a new constitution. On 10 February 2011, during the 2011 Egyptian revolution, Mubarak requested the amendment of Articles 76, 77, 88, 93 and 189, and the removal of Article 179. However, Mubarak's resignation was announced the following day with the Supreme Council of Egyptian Armed Forces assuming control.

On 13 February 2011, the armed forces suspended the constitution. It appointed the Egyptian constitutional review committee of 2011, and on 26 February 2011, the committee published a proposal to amend Articles 76, 77, 88, 93, 139, 148, and 189, as well as to remove Article 179. A referendum to accept or reject the changes was passed on 19 March 2011.

Within days the constitution was reinstated with the amendments in the Egyptian Constitutional Declaration of 2011 that "effectively voided" the 1971 Constitution. This paved the way for the 2011 parliamentary elections and the 2012 presidential election. It required that the newly elected parliament form a new constitutional drafting committee—the Constituent Assembly of Egypt—to write a permanent constitution for Egypt. On 30 November 2012, a draft constitution was approved by the Assembly, and on 26 December 2012, President Mohamed Morsi signed the new constitution into law.

== Overview ==
The Constitutional Proclamation of the constitution declares the main principles of the Egyptian Political system which are:

- Peace through Freedom
- Arab Unity
- National Development
- Freedom

The constitution establishes Egypt as a "Democratic State", deriving its sovereignty from the people, and as part of the Arab World. It proclaims the system of government as a multi-party Semi-presidential system within the framework of the basic principles and components of the Egyptian society. The Constitution upholds the concept of separation of powers; hence balances the powers of the three main authorities (Executive, Parliament, and the Judiciary). Within this scheme, the Parliament monitors the actions of Executive Authority through many mechanisms and instruments, and in order to fulfill such monitoring role, members of the People's Assembly enjoy parliamentary immunity.

The Constitution establishes party plurality as the foundation of the political system (Article 5) and so allows the formation of different political parties, but political parties are not allowed to be established based on any discriminatory basis such as religion, race, or sex.

The Constitution also sets out methods for its own amendment by the request of either the People's Assembly or the President, both of which have to be subjected to a public referendum, after being voted for by at least two-thirds of the Assembly.

== Freedoms ==
An entire chapter of the constitutional document is dedicated to defining the basic rights and freedoms to its citizens that is to be provided by the state.

The Constitution upholds that "Individual freedom is a natural right" and regards all citizens as equals. It guarantees a set of freedoms including: The "right to protect the private life of citizens"(Article 45), "Freedom of belief and the freedom of practising religious rights" (Article 46), "Freedom of expression" (Article 47), Freedom of Press and other publications (Article 48), Freedom of Artistic and literary creations and scientific research (Article 49), Freedom of peaceful and unarmed private assembly, without the need for prior notice (Article 54), Universal suffrage, as well as the right to form civil societies (Article 55).

However, the practice of such freedoms is usually hindered by the emergency laws that have been in effect for the past 3 decades.

In order to elevate pressures from its 2-decade long usage of such laws and with the government's plans of stopping the use of the emergency laws, a new Anti-Terrorism amendment was added to allow the provisioning of new laws that would help fight terrorism, given that these laws would not affect the basic rights of citizens especially those in Articles (41), (44), (45). This amendment in particular has been feared to be abused in the future by passing laws firmer than the emergency laws.

== Delegations and exercise of sovereignty ==
=== Executive ===
The executive branch is made up of the President, the Prime Minister, the cabinet of ministers, and the local administration. The President occupies the most powerful office in the government. Under Article 76, he had to be nominated by two thirds of the representatives in the People's Assembly, and later confirmed by a popular plebiscite. He appoints the Prime Minister from the party winning the majority of seats in parliament. However, the President has the power to relieve the Prime Minister from office without the parliament's approval and may also remove the cabinet of ministers but only after consulting with the prime minister. The President under this Constitution was the Supreme Commander of the Armed Forces of Egypt.

Customarily, the president is concerned with foreign policy and international relations while the Prime minister is concerned with domestic politics, economy and day-to-day operation of the government.

The President may dissolve the parliament for extraordinary reasons and must then call for new elections within 60 days.

The local Administration is made up of the governors of the 27 governorates and the local councils.

The President under this Constitution was elected to a 6-year term and could be renewed unlimited number of times.

=== Presidential order of succession ===
According to Article 84 of the constitution, the speaker of the People's Assembly is first in the order of succession to become acting President of Egypt if the president dies, becomes incapacitated or resigns. If the People's Assembly is dissolved at the time of a vacancy the President of the Supreme Constitutional Court shall take over the Presidential duties. Within 60 days after a vacancy of the post presidential elections should be held.

=== Legislature ===
According to the constitution, the parliament is made up of two chambers: The People's Assembly, the lower house; and the Shura Council, the upper house.

The People's Assembly may present the president for impeachment on the ground of grand treason or criminal conviction, by the agreement of one third of the People's Assembly seats. The President is impeached by the agreement of two-thirds of the People's Assembly. Upon the issuing of the impeachment decision, the president is relieved temporarily of his position and the prime minister takes office.

The People's Assembly may ask the withdrawal of confidence from the Prime minister by the request of One-tenth of the total seats (46 members). The People's Assembly may move to a vote of confidence from the government by a simply majority vote after at least 3 days from the request and a “istegwab” of the government. After the decision of withdrawing the confidence from the government has been made, the decision is moved to the president who may accept it and the government is then asked to resign or the president may re-present the case to the assembly once again, if the same decision was taken, the president is then forced to accept the decision. If the assembly reverts its decision, then this motion cannot be opened to the floor in the same parliamentary session.

=== Judiciary ===
According to the constitution, the Judiciary is an independent body and is vested with powers to oversee the practices of both the executive and legislative branches. Judges are independent and can not be taken out of office.

== Criticisms ==
=== Secular versus Islamic ===
The tradition of Egyptian constitutions has been secular in nature since the first modern constitution was founded in 1923. However, an amendment that differs from this tradition was passed in 1980.

According to the 1980 amendment of the Constitution, Islamic law (Sharia) became the principal source of legislative rules. Such wording simply implies that any new law that is being enacted or considered for enactment should not be in contravention of any prevailing principles of Islamic law (Sharia). It is worth noting that laws regulating personal status issues (marriage, divorce, inheritance, etc.) are derived from Islamic norms, but penal law rules as codified in the Penal Code are entirely non-religious rules, whether they were ratified before or after the 1980 amendment. Egypt has also enacted a number of new laws to respond to contemporary standards of global economic and business reform including laws on investment, anti-money laundering, intellectual property rights, competition, consumer protection, electronic signatures, banking, and taxation law.

With the apparent growing popularity of the Muslim Brotherhood after the 2005 parliamentary elections, the debate arose again discussing whether the state is secular or religious. The legitimacy of a religious political party is also in debate among intellectuals and politicians.

=== Integrity of the democratic process ===
One of the Egyptian long-standing traditions is the judicial monitoring of the elections. The amendments passed in 2007 would allow non-judiciary body members to perform the official monitoring and counting of the elections. This has sparked fears that the reason behind these amendments is the rigging of the elections which is something that had become popular in the last years.

=== Presidential elections ===
After the amendment of Article 76 in 2005 and its perceived draconian restrictions imposed on both partisan and independent presidential candidates, it was announced for reconsideration by the People's Assembly's chairman in November 2006 and was once again amended in 2007 to remove many of the restrictions.

In addition, the amendments did not include a ceiling for the number of terms a president is to serve in office.

== Timeline ==
The current constitution has had a number of amendments and phases.

- 1971 – President Sadat passed a new constitution named “The Permanent Constitution of Egypt.” The country still preserved its socialist tendency in Politics and economic system.
- 1980 – President Sadat passed a few amendments; most notably passing the Islamic Law (Sharia) became the principal source of legislative rules.
- 2005 – President Mubarak asked the parliament to amend Article 76 to allow multi-candidate presidential elections. However it was seen to have imposed draconian restrictions on both partisan and independent presidential candidates.
- 2007 – President Mubarak submitted a petition to the parliament to amend a total of 34 articles as part of his party's policies towards the democratization of the country's politics. Other notable amendments include the move towards capitalism, the adoption of an election system combining both Party list and Single Candidate List as well as the abolishment of the country's socialist institutions. The Egyptian parliament started the discussion on amending the bulk of proposed amendments. One-fifth of the parliament members left the parliament hall when the amendments were about to be approved. They eventually were approved in the absence of 110 members of the 454-member parliament in March 2007. On 26 March 2007, a public referendum was held and the new amendments were approved.
- 2011 – On 10 February 2011, during the 2011 Egyptian revolution, Former President Mubarak stated that he had requested that Articles 76, 77, 88, 93 and 189 be amended and that Article 179 be removed. Mubarak resigned the following day.
  - On 13 February 2011, the military suspended the constitution.
  - On 26 February 2011, the military government of Egypt published a proposal that would to amend Articles 76, 77, 88, 93, 139, 148 and 189 and to remove Article 179. The amendments passed with 77.2% in favor of them.
  - On 30 March 2011, the constitution was effectively voided as a new provisional constitution was passed by the custodian military council in power. The new provisional constitution was drafted to operate as a working constitution in the transitional period following the revolution, until a new one is drafted and approved.

The new provisional constitution included the most recent amendments, provisional articles defining the powers of the executive and judicial branches and paved the way for parliamentary elections in September and presidential elections in November. Additionally it directly stipulated that the formation of a new constitutional drafting committee to write a new constitution.
