= Constitution of Egypt =

Fundamental law of Egypt since 2014

Constitution of the Arab Republic of Egypt
- Coat of arms of Egypt

Overview
- Jurisdiction: Egypt
- Presented: 14 – 15 January 2014
- Ratified: 18 January 2014
- Date effective: 18 January 2014
- System: Unitary semi-presidential republic

Government structure
- Branches: Three (Legislative, Executive, Judiciary)
- Head of state: President of Egypt
- Chambers: Senate; House of Representatives
- Executive: Cabinet of Egypt
- Federalism: No
- Electoral college: No

History
- Amendments: 1
- Last amended: 2019 Egyptian constitutional referendum
- Signatories: Egyptian constitutional referendum, 2014
- Supersedes: Egyptian Constitution of 2012

Full text
- Constitution of Egypt at Wikisource

The Constitution of the Arab Republic of Egypt (Arabic: دستور مصر, romanized: Dustūr Miṣr) is the fundamental law of Egypt. The Egyptian Constitution of 2014 was passed in a referendum in January 2014. The constitution took effect after the results were announced on 18 January 2014. A constitutional amendments referendum was held from 20 to 22 April 2019.

== Background ==
In July 2013, after the ousting of former President Mohammed Morsi, the military announced the schedule for the development of the constitution, with the vote to occur around the end of November 2013. Two different committees were involved in amending the 2012 constitution. The constitution replaces the Egyptian Constitution of 2012 which came into effect under Morsi.

== Contents ==
The constitution adopted in 2014, like the constitution drafted under Morsi, is based on the Egyptian Constitution of 1971.

The 2014 constitution sets up a president and parliament. The president is elected to a six-year term and may serve one term. The parliament may impeach the president. Under the constitution, there is a guarantee of equality between the sexes and an absolute freedom of belief, but Islam is the state religion. The military retains the ability to appoint the national Minister of Defense for the next 8 years. Under the constitution, political parties may not be based on "religion, race, gender or geography"; the law regarding Egyptian political parties that regulated the 2011–2012 parliamentary elections included a similar clause prohibiting religious parties, though it was not enforced. The document, whilst it does proclaim an absolute freedom of expression, that freedom is often subject to exceptions leading to legal consequences often targeting public supporters of the LGBTQ community. The constitution protects texts pertaining to presidency terms, freedoms and equality from being amended in an entrenched clause in article 226, except with more guarantees.

== Reception ==
In 2014, the constitution was criticized by the Revolutionary Socialists and the Road of the Revolution Front, who perceived it as leaving too much power in the hands of the military.

== See also ==
- History of the Egyptian Constitution
