= Egyptian Constitution of 2012 =

Fundamental law of Egypt from 2012 to 2014

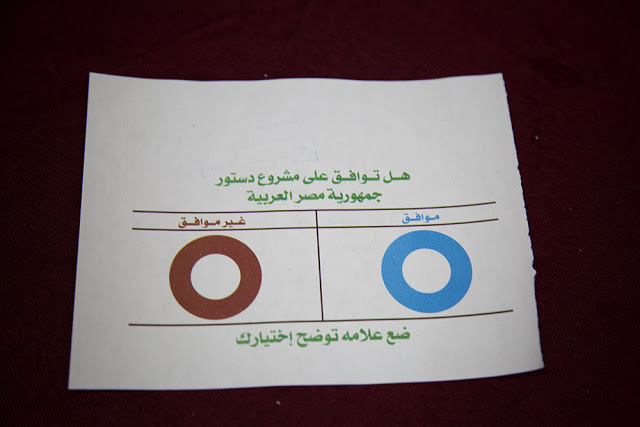
Ballot of Egyptian voters used in the constitutional referendum on 22-Dec-2012

The Constitution of the Arab Republic of Egypt was the former fundamental law of Egypt. It was signed into law by President Mohamed Morsi on 26 December 2012, after it was approved by the Constituent Assembly on 30 November 2012 and passed in a referendum held 15–22 December 2012 with 64% support, and a turnout of 33%. It replaced the 2011 Provisional Constitution of Egypt, adopted in 2011 following the Egyptian revolution. On 3 July 2013, the constitution was suspended by order of the Egyptian army. On 8 July 2013, acting President Adly Mansour issued a decree that envisaged the introduction of amendments to the constitution and put them to a referendum; if approved, the suspended-constitution would be restored into law. The current constitutional declaration has the power of a constitution; it outlines the authorities of the president and establishes many rights.

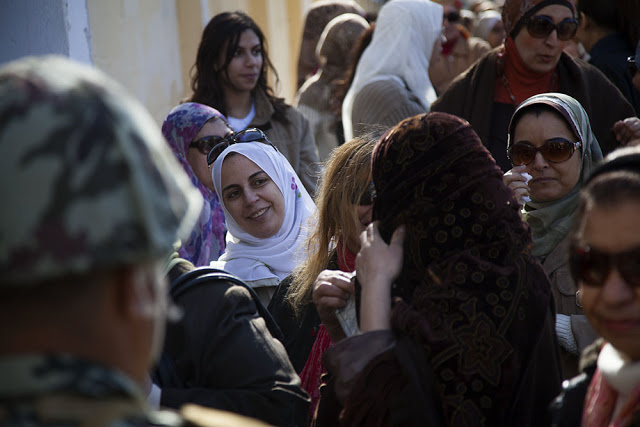
Women in Giza wait to vote in Egypt's constitutional referendum on 22-Dec-2012

The constitution and the manner in which it was adopted have been one focus of the 2012–13 Egyptian protests. Zaghoul el-Balshi, the general secretary of the commission overseeing the planned constitutional referendum, resigned in the wake of the protests.

The 2012 Constitution was superseded by the Egyptian Constitution of 2014.

== Background ==
The Constituent Assembly was originally elected by Parliament in March 2012, before being dissolved by a court in April after it was deemed unconstitutional. A second Assembly was elected by Parliament during the summer. The Assembly produced a 234 article draft constitution, and approved each article individually during a 19-hour meeting starting on 29 November 2012.

== Contents ==
=== General content ===
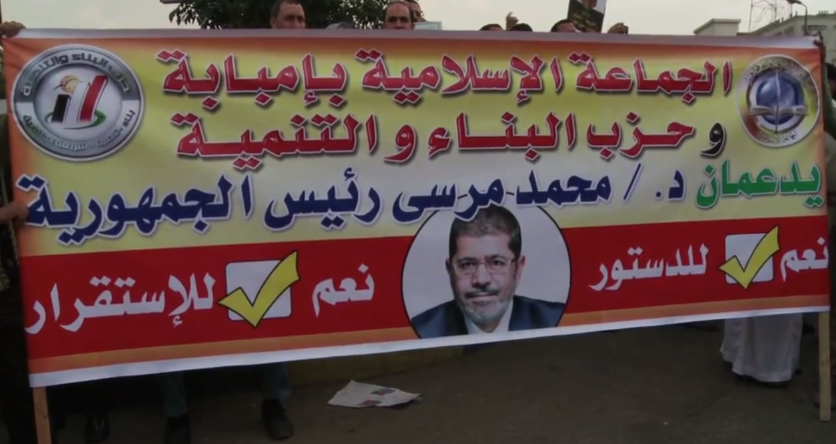
Pro-Morsi sign in 2012 constitutional referendum

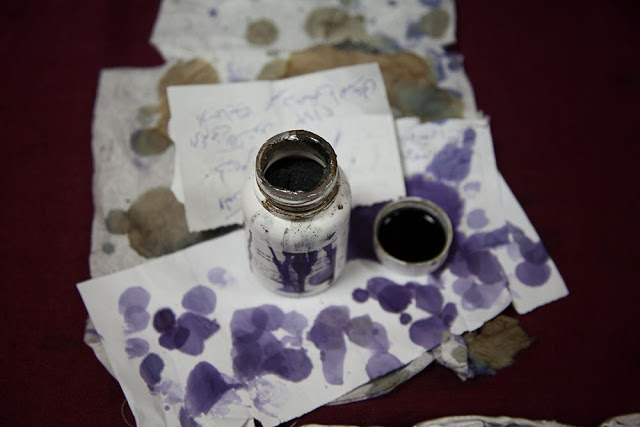
Voters in Cairo stain their fingers with ink after voting to prevent repeat voting on 22-Dec-2012

The constitution ends Egypt's all-powerful presidency, institutes a stronger parliament, and contains provisions against torture or detention without trial. But it also gave Egypt's generals much of the power and privilege they had during the Hosni Mubarak era. Human Rights Watch noted that it provides for basic protections against arbitrary detention and torture and for some economic rights but fails to end military trials of civilians or to protect freedom of expression and religion. The organization also stated that the Chapter II draft, entitled Rights and Freedoms, provides for strong protection against arbitrary detention in article 35 and torture and inhumane treatment in article 36, and for freedom of movement in article 42, privacy of communication in article 38, freedom of assembly in article 50, and of association in article 51, but defers to objections from the country's military leadership and has removed the clear prohibition of trials of civilians before military courts.

Article 2, makes "the principles of Islamic law the main source of legislation," a statement defining the relationship between Islam and Egyptian law, essentially unchanged from Egypt's old constitution. At the urging of Islamists, another article was added to the constitution strengthening the relationship, defining the "principles of Shariah" in the terms of Muslim Sunni jurisprudence i.e. "evidence, rules, jurisprudence and sources" accepted by Sunni Islam. Liberals fear "Islamic punishments for things like theft, adultery, and blasphemy are not far behind".

Article 50 preserves the right to assembly but requires "notification" of such gatherings. The constitution calls for freedom from discrimination, but does not specify whether women or religious minorities are protected. A provision on women's equality was left out to avoid a dispute after ultraconservatives insisted that women's equality should be qualified by compliance with religious laws. One article that passed pertains to arbitrary arrest and detention rights. The article says that no person may be "arrested, searched, incarcerated, deprived of freedom in any way and/or confined" unless it is ordered by a "competent judge". Another article stipulates that anyone jailed must be told why in writing within 12 hours, and the case must go to investigators within 24 hours. Detainees cannot be interrogated without their attorney or one appointed to them being present, the article also states. Phone conversations, electronic correspondence and other communication cannot be listened to without a warrant.

The new constitution limits the President to two four-year terms, marking a clear shift away from the era of Mubarak, who ruled for 30 years. But other checks on presidential power remain ill-defined. The defense minister may be chosen from the military's officers. Insulating the armed forces from parliamentary oversight, a special council that includes military officers oversees military affairs and the defense budget. Mr. Ali of the International Institute for Democratic and Electoral Assistance noted that another article in the document calls for the election of local councils in each province but keeps all the power in the hands of federally appointed governors. And even though Egypt's pervasive public corruption was a major complaint by those who forced Hosni Mubarak from power, the assembly declined to borrow any international models to promote transparency, Ali said. "There won't be a huge improvement in the way government works and the way services are delivered, and that is a setback for democracy."

=== Specific contents ===
==== Protection of rights ====
Article 81 states that no law may limit the essence of the rights and freedoms set out in the constitution but goes on to say that, "These rights and freedoms shall be exercised insofar as they do not contradict the principles set out in the Chapter on State and Society in this constitution." The provisions in that chapter include article 10, which states that, "The state and society shall commit to preserving the true nature of the Egyptian family," and article 11, which states that, "The state shall protect ethics and morals and public order."

==== Freedom of expression ====
Article 45 protects freedom of expression without stating what legitimate limitations are permissible and how to balance this right against article 31, which states that, "The individual person may not be insulted," and article 44 prohibiting "the insulting of prophets."

==== Freedom of religion ====
Believers in any of the three Abrahamic religions – Islam, Christianity and Judaism – are guaranteed the freedom of worship, but only those three. More specifically Article 43 on freedom of religion grants the right to practice religion and to establish places of worship to Muslims, Christians, and Jews, but excludes followers of other religions, including Egyptian Baháʼís, as well as irreligious individuals.

==== Defense of religion ====
Article 44 forbids insulting any Abrahamic prophets, but the constitution offers no guidance about how to balance this article with Article 45 guarantees freedom of expression.

Article 48, which regulates freedom of the press, requires that the press not "contradict the principles on which the state and society are based" – a reference to the principles of Shariah.

==== Family ====
The constitution obligates the state to "preserve" traditional family values based on Islam. Article nine states that "family is the basis of society and is founded on religion, ethics and patriotism. The State and the society have to maintain the authentic character of the Egyptian family, and to work on its cohesion, stability and protection of its traditions and moral values. "

==== Military trials of civilians ====
According to the draft the military retains the ability to try civilians in military courts if they are accused of damaging the armed forces. Article 198 provides that, "Civilians may not be tried before the military justice system except for crimes that harm the armed forces, and this shall be defined by law." This leaves intact the military's discretion to try civilians under the Code of Military Justice.

==== Freedom from discrimination and women's rights ====
The new constitution no longer specifically forbids discrimination on the basis of gender but calls for freedom from discrimination by declaring, under principle number five of the constitution's preamble, "Citizens are equal before the law and are equal in general rights and duties without discrimination between them based on gender, origin, language, religion, belief, opinion, social status or disability." It also explicitly states in article 68 that "The State is committed to taking all measures to establish equality between women and men in political, cultural, economic and social life and all other fields without prejudice to the provisions of Islamic Sharia." The constitution also secures particular care for mothers and children in Article 10 by ensuring that "the State provides mother and child services for free and guarantees for women health, social, and economic care." These provisions are closely related to earlier Egyptian constitutions (1956 and 1971).

==== Status of international obligations ====
Article 145 states that the president shall sign treaties and that they must be ratified by the upper and lower houses of parliament, and goes on to say that, "No international treaty that contradicts the provisions of this constitution shall be signed." Human Rights Watch had urged members of the assembly to include a provision directly incorporating human rights as defined by international treaties ratified by Egypt into Egyptian law to strengthen the basis for amending many domestic laws that restrict rights.
