= Egyptian Constitutional Declaration of 2011 =

Provisional Constitution of Egypt
- Created: March 30, 2011
- Author: Supreme Council of the Armed Forces of Egypt
- Purpose: Fundamental Law of Egypt

The Constitutional Declaration of 2011 (also known as the Provisional Constitution of the Arab Republic of Egypt) was a measure adopted by the Supreme Council of the Armed Forces of Egypt on 30 March 2011. The declaration was intended to serve as the fundamental law of the country pending the enactment of a permanent constitution, following the resignation of President Hosni Mubarak on 11 February.

The provisional declaration consisted of 63 articles, including a number of amendments approved by referendum. It defined the powers of the executive and judiciary, and stipulated presidential and legislative election processes, paving the way for the 2011 parliamentary elections and the 2012 presidential election. It required that the newly elected parliament form a new constitutional drafting committee - the Constituent Assembly of Egypt - to write a permanent constitution for Egypt. On November 30, 2012, a draft constitution was approved by the Assembly.

== Overview ==
The declaration declared Egypt to be a "democratic state", deriving its sovereignty from the people, and a part of the Arab world. It proclaimed the system of government to be a multi-party semi-presidential system within the framework of the basic principles and components of Egyptian society.

The declaration aimed to establish a party plurality as the foundation of the political system (Article 1) and to allow the formation of different political parties; however it declared that parties were not allowed to be established based on any sectarian basis such as religion, race or sex (Article 4).

The declaration stated that "individual freedom is a natural right" and that all citizens are equal. It guaranteed a set of freedoms including the "right to protect the private life of citizens"(Article 8), "freedom of belief and the freedom of practising religious rights" (Article 12), "freedom of expression" (Article 12), freedom of the press and other publications (Article 13), freedom of peaceful and unarmed private assembly, without the need for prior notice (Article 16), universal suffrage, and the right to form civil societies (Article 4).

== Delegations and exercise of sovereignty ==
=== Executive ===
The executive branch is made up of the President, the Prime Minister, the cabinet of ministers and the local administration. The President appoints the Prime Minister from the party winning the majority of seats in parliament. However the President has the power to relieve the Prime Minister from office without the parliament's approval and may also remove the cabinet of ministers but after the consultations of the prime minister. The President serves for a four-year term with a limit of two terms.

A candidate is eligible for office after meeting the following qualifications: The nominee must be an Egyptian citizen of at least 40 years of age, have never held another citizenship, and must not be married to a foreigner. Both of the nominee's parents must be Egyptian citizens, and have never held foreign citizenship. The nominee must not be under a suspension of political and civic rights. (Article 26)

Article 27 defines the different tracks for nomination which candidates may choose in presidential elections: - Nominees must win the endorsement of 30 elected members of Parliament; - Nominees must win the endorsement of 30,000 registered voters from 15 governorates with at least 1000 endorsements from each of those governorates; - Parties with at least one elected seat in parliament may nominate one of their members in presidential elections.

=== Legislative ===
According to the constitution, the parliament is made up of two chambers: The People's Assembly, the lower house, and the Shura Council, the upper house. The parliament will assume its legislative powers from the military council after its elections in November 2011.

=== Judicial ===
According to the constitution, the Judiciary is an independent body and is vested with powers to oversee the practices of both the executive and legislative branches. Judges are independent and can not be taken out of office.
