= Maria Moczydłowska =

Polish educator and politician

Member of the Legislative Sejm
- In office 1919–1922
- Constituency: Częstochowa

Personal details
- Born: 4 October 1886 Łomża, Russian Empire
- Died: 26 April 1969 (aged 82) Sopot, Poland

Maria Moczydłowska (4 October 1886 – 26 April 1969) was a Polish educator and politician. She was one of the first group of women elected to the Legislative Sejm in 1919, serving in parliament until 1922.

== Biography ==
Moczydłowska was born Maria Grzymkowska in Łomża (then part of the Russian Empire) in 1886 to Józef and Feliksa. She became involved in the co-operative movement in 1902 and in 1905 participated in the Russian Revolution and went on strike. She became a teacher, teaching in Kalisz, Łomża and Warsaw. After marrying Mieczysław Moczydłowski, she worked with her husband at an agricultural school at Lisków, where she also worked alongside Wacław Bliziński. In 1913 she published a book, Wieś Lisków.

She was a Polish United Party (PZL) candidate in Częstochowa in the 1919 parliamentary elections and was one of five women elected. Moczydłowska subsequently became the first woman to speak in a debate in the Legislative Sejm. After the PZL split in July 1919, she became a member of the National People's Union (NZL) and served as secretary of the party's parliamentary faction. During the term of the Sejm, she was a member of the Education, Labour Protection and Social Welfare committees. She argued for prohibition and an act restricting the sale of alcoholic drinks became known as 'Lex Moczydłowska'. On several occasions she absented herself from the Sejm to avoid having to vote against measures she supported but the NZL opposed; in July 1919 she 'fainted' during a debate on land reform and left the chamber; the bill passed by one vote. During a 1921 debate on removing virilists from the Senate, she left to 'make a phone call'; the legislation was passed by three votes.

After losing her bid for re-election in 1922 as a Polish Centre candidate, she helped organise Polish schools in France and then joined the Warsaw School Board, where she worked in the adult education department. Mieczysław died in 1925 and Moczydłowska remarried, becoming the wife of Tymoteusz Niekrasz, a tax official. During World War II she taught underground, and after the war, became a kindergarten inspector in Sopot. She also became chair of the local branch of the Społem cooperative and served as vice president of the Rural Housewives Club. She was also a member of the Polish Teachers' Union and the Polish United Workers' Party.

Moczydłowska received several awards, including the Golden Cross of Merit in 1948, the Silver Cross of Merit in 1959, and another Golden Cross of Merit, the Order of Polonia Restituta and the Medal of the Decade of Regained Independence in 1960. She died in Sopot in 1969.
