= Legislative Sejm (Second Polish Republic) =

National parliament (Sejm) of the Second Polish Republic

The Legislative Sejm or Constituent Sejm (Polish: Sejm Ustawodawczy) was the first national parliament (Sejm), and simultaneously Constituent Assembly of the newly independent Poland, sitting from 1919 to 1922. It was elected in the 1919 Polish legislative election.

== Background ==
The Legislative Sejm was formed in the aftermath of World War I on the territories of the newly independent Second Polish Republic. In late 1918 Polish state was governed by Józef Piłsudski, who quickly begun the work to organize election to the first Polish national parliament (Sejm) since the Grodno Sejm of 1793, held two years before partitions of Poland ended the independent existence of the Polish–Lithuanian Commonwealth.

== History ==
The elections to the Sejm took place on January 26, 1919. At that time, Poland did not have fixed boundaries, and was involved in territorial conflicts and disputes. On the territories under the nascent Polish state's control, in the lands of former Congress Kingdom and Podlasie region, and western Lesser Poland, 42 electoral districts returned 302 deputies. In addition, 20 Polish deputies to the German Parliament, 26 Polish deputies to the Austro-Hungarian Parliament, and selected candidates from the Cieszyn region (where elections were disrupted due to hostilities) were added to the Sejm. In the coming months, as the Polish control grew over some disputed territories, more elections were held: on April 25, 1919, in Greater Poland and on June 15, 1919 in the Białystok and Podlasie regions. Some deputies who were provisional representatives yielded their seats to the newly elected ones. On March 24, 1922, the Sejm was joined by 20 deputies from the Republic of Central Lithuania (the dissolved Sejm of Central Lithuania). The Sejm thus had a changing number of deputies, starting at 348 and ending its term with 432 members. About 5 million votes were cast in the election.

Important legislation passed by the Sejm included laws on the military draft, land reform, and the development of a constitution, and the state-sponsored health insurance system. In 1921 the Sejm passed the March Constitution.

== Composition ==
Due to the changing number of deputies, and the ongoing fragmentation and merger of various parties, there is a number of different composition listings for the Legislative Sejm.^{[a]}

The composition of the Legislative Sejm was as follows:

| Party or group (Polish name) | Party or group (Jędruch) | Party or group (Nohlen and Stöver) | Votes (Nohlen and Stöver) | % (Nohlen and Stöver) | Seats (Nohlen and Stöver) | Seats (Jędruch) |
|---|---|---|---|---|---|---|
| Związek Ludowo-Narodowy | not listed | Popular National Union | 1,616,157 | 29.0 | 140 | ? |
| ? | National Democrats | not listed | | | | 72 |
| Polska Partia Socjalistyczna | Socialist | Polish Socialist Party | 515,062 | 9.2 | 35 | 34 |
| Polskie Stronnictwo Ludowe "Wyzwolenie" | Peasant Wyzwolenie | Polish People's Party "Wyzwolenie" | 839,914 | 15.1 | 59 | 24 |
| Polskie Stronnictwo Ludowe "Piast" | Peasant Piast | Polish People's Party "Piast" | 232,983 | 4.2 | 46 | listed with no number |
| Polskie Stronnictwo Ludowe Lewica | not listed | Polish People's Party "Left" | 197,838 | 3.5 | 12 | |
| ? | not listed | Polish United Peasants' Party | 212,097 | 3.8 | 35 | |
| ? | not listed | Peasants' Lists | 234,399 | 4.2 | 0 | |
| ? | Peasants' Total | not listed | | | | 90 |
| ? | Conservative | not listed | | | | 44 |
| Stronnictwo Katolicko-Ludowe | not listed | Catholic People's Party | 102,292 | 1.8 | 18 | |
| ? | Christian Democrats | not listed | | | | 31 |
| ? | National Labor | not listed | | | | 25 |
| ? | Middle Class | not listed | | | | 63 |
| ? | Communist | not listed | | | | 2 |
| ? | Minority (German) | National Minorities | 96,677 | 1.7 | 2 | 2 |
| ? | Minority (Jewish) | Jewish Group | 602,927 | 10.8 | 11 | 16 |
| Narodowa Partia Pracy | not listed | National Workers' Union | 67,285 | 1.2 | 32 | |
| Bezpartyjni; bez przynależności klubowej | Small parties, independents | Local lists and independents | 863,349 | 15.5 | 4 | 29 |
| Total | | | 5,580,980 | 100 | 394 | 432 |

Marshal of the Sejm was Wojciech Trąmpczyński.

== In July 1922 ==
| Party | Seats | % |
|---|---|---|
| Polskie Stronnictwo Ludowe "Piast" Polish Folk | 96 | 22,3 |
| Związek Ludowo-Narodowy | 81 | 18,8 |
| Narodowe Zjednoczenie Ludowe | 45 | 3,9 |
| Polska Partia Socjalistyczna | 34 | 10,4 |
| Narodowo-Chrześcijańskie Stronnictwo Ludowe | 26 | 6,0 |
| Narodowo-Chrześcijański Klub Robotniczy | 26 | 6,0 |
| Klub: Polskie Stronnictwo Ludowe "Wyzwolenie" | 24 | 5,6 |
| Narodowa Partia Robotnicza | 21 | 4,9 |
| Klub Pracy Konstytucyjnej | 16 | 3,7 |
| Klub: Polskie Stronnictwo Ludowe—Lewica | 11 | 2,5 |
| Zjednoczenie Mieszczańskie | 11 | 2,5 |
| Stronnictwo Katolicko-Ludowe | 7 | 1,6 |
| Narodowa Partia Pracy (II RP) | 6 | 1,4 |
| Rady Ludowe | 5 | 1,1 |
| Komunistyczna Frakcja Poselska | 2 | 0,5 |
| Wolne Zjednoczenie Posłów Narodowości Żydowskiej (Jews) | 10 | 2,9 |
| Niemieckie Stronnictwo Ludowe (Germans) | 7 | 1,6 |
| Independent | 4 | 0,9 |
| Totals | 432 | 100 |

== Notes ==
a. Neither Nohlen and Stöver nor Jędruch did retain original for Polish parties and groups; they used their own translations. As such, identification with a particular entity was not always possible.

== See also ==
- Small Constitution (1919)
