= Karol Popiel =

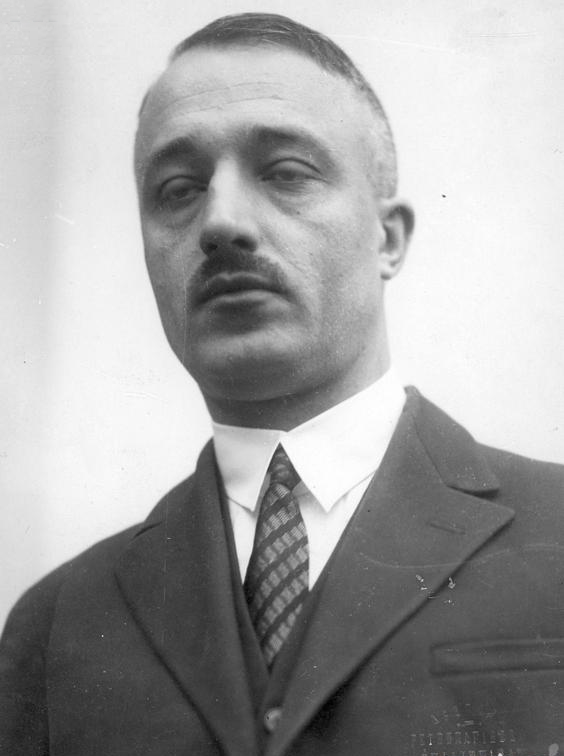

Minister of Justice
- In office 20 October 1941 – 20 January 1942
- Prime Minister: Władysław Sikorski
- Preceded by: Herman Lieberman
- Succeeded by: Wacław Komarnicki

Minister for the reconstruction of public administration
- In office 14 July 1943 – 29 November 1944
- Prime Minister: Stanisław Mikołajczyk
- Succeeded by: Stanisław Sopicki

Leader of Labor Party
- In office 1945–1946
- Succeeded by: Feliks Widy-Wirski

Personal details
- Born: 28 October 1887 Rzochów, Kingdom of Galicia and Lodomeria, Austria-Hungary
- Died: 6 June 1977 (aged 89) Rome, Italy
- Party: National Workers' Party Labor Party

Karol Michał Popiel (28 October 1887 – 6 June 1977) was a Polish politician of the christian democracy tendency and writer. During World War II Popiel served as Minister of Justice from 1941 to 1942 and Minister for the reconstruction of public administration from 1943 to 1944 in the Polish government in exile. After the end of war, he was a leader of the Labor Party from 1945 to 1946.

== Biography ==
He was active in Temporary Commission of Confederated Independence Parties.

During World War I he fought in the Polish Legions. From 1918 to 1921 he worked in Ministers of Internal Affairs. In 1920 he was one of the founders of the National Workers' Party, from 1929 to 1937 he was the president of this party. From 1922 to 1927 he was a member of the Sejm.

From 1930 he was a member of Centrolew and Front Morges alliances. In the period from September to December 1930, he was imprisoned by the Sanation authorities in the Brest Fortress for political reasons. From 1937 to 1939 he was the vice president and in practice leader of the Labor Party.

After German aggression against Poland, he went to France and later to United Kingdom, where he worked in the structures of the Polish government-in-exile. From autumn 1939 to November 1941, he was undersecretary of state in the Ministry of Labor and Social Welfare. He was a supporter of the policy of general Władysław Sikorski. After the German invasion of the Soviet Union, a supporter of the normalization of Polish-Soviet relations. From October 1941 to January 1942, he served as minister of justice. From January 1942 to July 1943, he served as minister without portfolio and from July 1943 to November 1944, he served as minister of reconstruction of public administration.

In the summer of 1945 he returned to Poland. Until 1946, he was a leader of Labor Party. From December 1945 to March 1946, he was a member of the State National Council. In November 1947 he went to the United States. Later he stayed in Paris. From 1962 he lived in Rome. In exile, he sought recognition by Western European countries of the Poland-German border on the Oder and Lusatian Neisse.

He devoted himself to writing books. Publications issued in exile in Polish People's Republic due to censorship were not published until the 1980s.

He was buried at Powązki Cemetery in Warsaw.

== Awards ==
- Commander's Cross with Star of the Order of Polonia Restituta (1946)

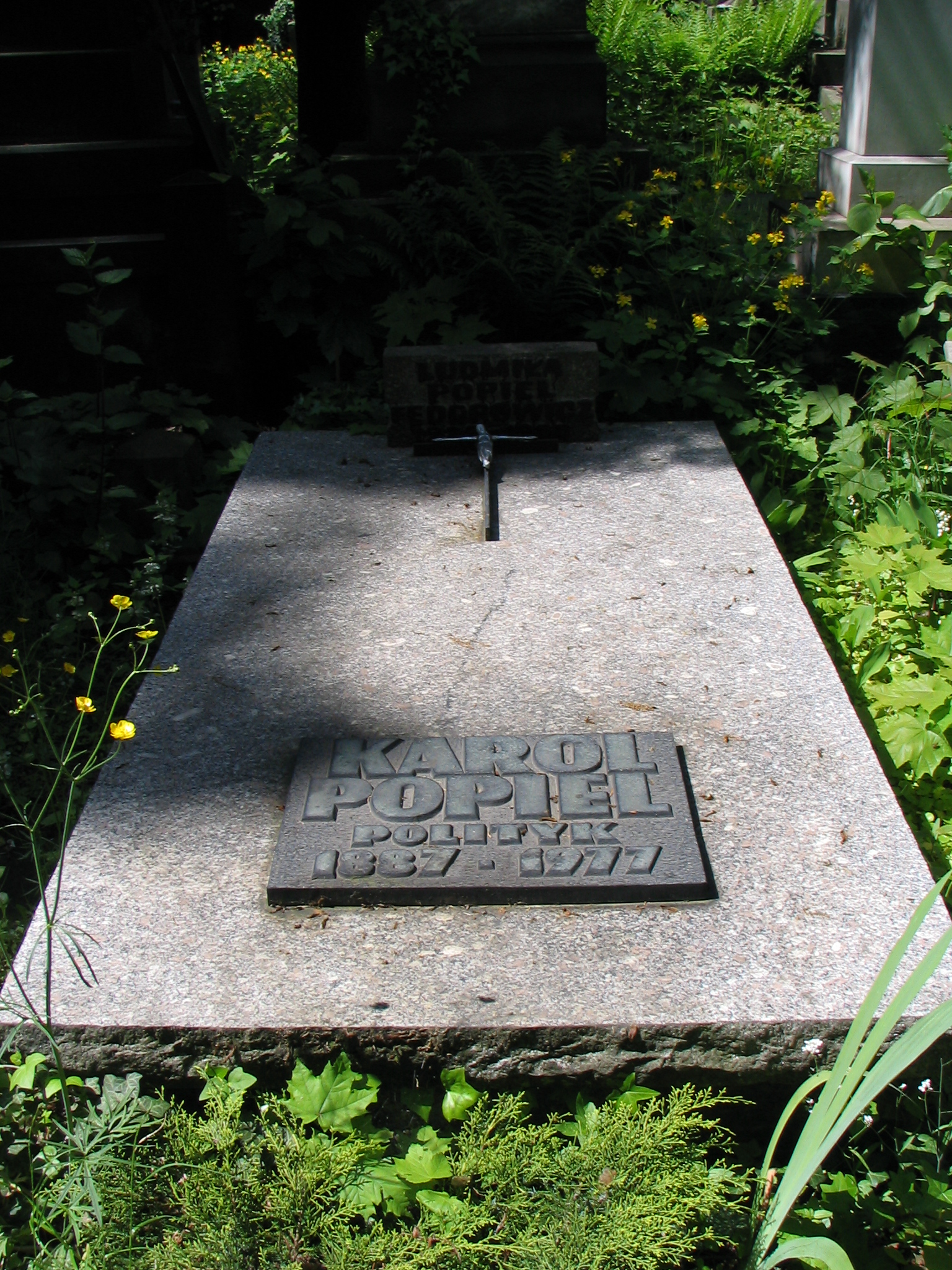
The grave of Karol Popiel at Powązki Cemetery in Warsaw

== In culture ==
In the film Katastrofa w Gibraltarze (1983), he was portrayed by Jerzy Złotnicki.
