= Apolinary Hartglas =

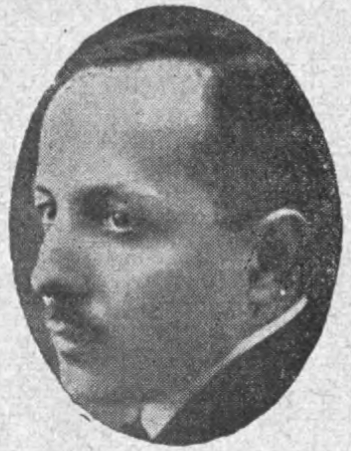
- Apolinary Hartglas
- Born: 7 April 1883; Biała Podlaska, Poland
- Died: 7 March 1953 (aged 69); Tel Aviv, Israel
- Education: University of Warsaw

Maksymilian Apolinary Hartglas (7 April 1883 – 7 March 1953) was a Zionist activist and one of the main political leaders of Polish Jews during the interwar period, a lawyer, a publicist, and a Sejm deputy from 1919 to 1930.

== Biography ==
Maksymilian Apolinary Hartglas was born into a lawyer family from Podlasie. Between 1892 and 1900 he attended a secondary school in Biała Podlaska. Subsequently he earned a law degree from Warsaw University in 1904. Between 1907 and 1919 he practiced law in Siedlce with an additional office in Warsaw. While at the university he became involved with the Zionist movement and in 1906 he participated in a Zionist Helsingfors conference in Helsinki.

After the Nazi invasion of Poland and German occupation he was made a member of the Warsaw Judenrat.

In December 1939, he managed to escape to Trieste, Italy and immigrated to Palestine. He settled in Jerusalem. After the establishment of the State of Israel he served as a high ranking administrator in the Ministry of the Interior.

== Political career ==
In 1919 he was elected by constituents of Biała Podlaska as a deputy to the first Sejm of the newly independent Polish state which was charged with writing a new constitution. In all he served three terms as a delegate. Before the elections of 1922 together with Yitzhak Gruenbaum he was a co-creator of Bloc of National Minorities, a parliamentary organization whose purpose was to represent ethnic minorities in the Polish parliament. One of his first acts as a deputy of the Sejm was to introduce a law which annulled all Russian sponsored laws which discriminated against Jews in the former Congress Poland.

In 1920 he took part in the Polish-Soviet War as a volunteer. Between 1938 and 1939 he was a member of the Warsaw City Council. During this time he published articles in "Głos Żydowski", "Tygodnik Żydowski" and "Życie Żydowskie" newspapers.

== Published works ==
In 1996, his memoirs were published posthumously in Poland under the title At the border of two worlds (Polish: Na pograniczu dwóch światów) (ISBN 978-83-86678-35-8), in which he described the social and political realities of Poland at the turn of the century, during World War I, and the interwar period. In the book he wrote:

I called my memoirs “At the border of two worlds” not because I had in mind the world of today and the eternal ever existing world but for a much more mundane reason. I, myself as a human being found myself at a border of the Jewish world and the Polish world. To elaborate, throughout my whole life, two forces, difficult to reconcile, strove within me: a Polish childhood and upbringing, an attachment to the Polish nation, its culture and its soil together with a self formed love for the Jewish nation, its suffering and troubles and the hope of its rebirth in its own homeland. My whole life I suffered a split within myself since there is no power that could have fused these two different souls. I loved both nations as a man and I was at times critical and angry at both of them: as a Jew I could not forget the wrongs that my people sometimes suffered in Poland (personally I have not suffered these) and as one assimilated into the Polish culture I shared some of the grief that even the best of Poles occasionally had towards the Jews. ^{(Translated from Polish)}

== See also ==
- Ozjasz Thon
