= Noach Pryłucki =

Jewish Polish politician and scholar

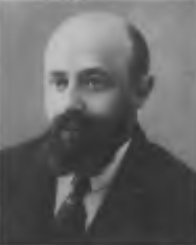
Noach Pryłucki. The photo was probably taken between 1919 and 1927, when he was a member of the Polish Sejm.

Noach (Nojach) Pryłucki or Noach Prilutski (Yiddish: נח פּרילוצקי; 1 October 1882 in Berdichev – 12 August 1941 in Vilnius) was a Jewish Polish politician from the Folkspartei. He was also a Yiddish linguist, philologist, lawyer and scholar of considerable renown. Pryłucki was a respected attorney and was said to have had "leadership over the scattered (non-Zionist) national clubs, societies, and groups".

In 1910–1936, Pryłucki was the editor of the Folkist newspaper Warszawer Togblat (The Warsaw Daily), later renamed as Der Moment. In 1916 he was the founder and then became the leader of the Jewish People's Party in Poland (Folkspartei), and was elected the same year at the municipal elections (under German occupation), where the Folkspartei gained 4 seats in Warsaw. In 1918 he became a member of the Provisional Council of State of the Kingdom of Poland. Elected as a member of the Legislative Sejm in 1919, he had to resign his seat because he was not a Polish citizen. After obtaining Polish citizenship, in 1922–1927 he was reelected to the Sejm on the Bloc of National Minorities list.

Pryłucki authored numerous books on Yiddish folklore, philology, culture and theatre, published in Warsaw. He once said of Yiddish theatre that it did not arise simultaneously with theatre in other European "national" languages; he conjectured that this was at least in part because the Jewish sense of nationality favoured Hebrew over Yiddish as a "national" language, but few Jews of the period were comfortable using Hebrew outside of a religious/liturgical context.

After Soviet forces took Vilna in January 1941, he was appointed the head of the YIVO Institute.

He was murdered by the Gestapo in Vilnius (Wilno) in August 1941.
