= Confederate commission =

Confederate commission may refer to:

- Confederate States peace commission of 1861 in the Confederated States of America
- Commission on the Naming of Items of the Department of Defense that Commemorate the Confederate States of America or Any Person Who Served Voluntarily with the Confederate States of America, mandated in 2021
- Temporary Commission of Confederated Independence Parties in 1912 in the Austrian Partition
