= Sejm =

Lower house of the parliament of Poland

Coordinates: 52.2252°N 21.0280°E

Sejm of the Republic of Poland Sejm Rzeczypospolitej Polskiej
- 10th term

Type
- Type: Lower house of the Polish parliament

History
- Founded: 1493 (historical); 1918 (contemporary)

Leadership
- Marshal of the Sejm: Włodzimierz Czarzasty, NL since 18 November 2025
- Deputy Marshal of the Sejm: Monika Wielichowska, KO; Dorota Niedziela, KO; Piotr Zgorzelski, PSL; Krzysztof Bosak, RN since 13 November 2023 Szymon Hołownia, PL2050 since 18 November 2025; Marcin Horała, R+ since 18 September 2026
- Senior Marshal: Marek Sawicki, PSL since 13 November 2023
- Prime Minister: Donald Tusk, KO since 13 December 2023
- Leader of the Opposition (Note: Though the by-laws of the Sejm do not mention such a position, the leader of the largest opposition party is called leader of the opposition by convention.): Jarosław Kaczyński, PiS since 13 December 2023

Structure
- Seats: 460 deputies (231 majority)
- Political groups: Government (Tusk III) (239): KO (156) (Note: KO (142); Greens (2); AU (1); Forward! (1); Independent (10) (Note: Endorsed by KO: Franciszek Sterczewski, Bogusław Wołoszański, Apoloniusz Tajner, Piotr Adamowicz, Iwona Hartwich, Rafał Siemaszko, Sylwia Bielawska, Alicja Chybicka, Łukasz Ścieborowski, Renata Rak)); KP (32) (Note: PSL (28); CdP (3); Independent (1) (Note: Endorsed by PSL: Marek Biernacki)); The Left (21); Centre (15) (Note: UC (11); Independent (4) (Note: Endorsed by UC: Ryszard Petru, Marcin Skonieczka, Norbert Pietrykowski, Rafał Komarewicz)); PL2050 (15) (Note: PL2050 party (14); PL2050 association (1) (Note: Bożenna Hołownia)); Supported by (4): Non-aligned (4) (Note: elected on Civic Coalition list (PO): Marcin Józefaciuk elected on Third Way list (PL2050): Joanna Mucha, Paweł Zalewski, Tomasz Zimoch); Opposition (217): PiS (147) (Note: PiS (141); ONRP (4); Independent (2) (Note: Endorsed by PiS: Małgorzata Wassermann, Paweł Sałek)); R+ (40); KWiN (17) (Note: NN (8); RN (7); Independent (2) (Note: Endorsed by RN: Andrzej Zapałowski Endorsed by NN: Tomasz Rzymkowski)); Razem (4); DB (3) (Note: K'15 (2); WiD (1)); KKP (3); Non-aligned (3) (Note: elected on The Left list (Razem): Paulina Matysiak elected on United Right list (PiS): Łukasz Mejza, Janusz Kowalski)
- Committees: 31: Administration and Internal Affairs; Agriculture and Rural Development; Children and Youth Affairs; Constitutional Accountability; Culture and Media; Deputies' Ethics; Deregulation Affairs; Digitization, Innovation and Modern Technology; Economy and Development; Education and Science; Energy, Climate and State Assets; Environment Protection, Natural Resources and Forestry; European Union Affairs; Family and Women Rights; Foreign Affairs; Health; Infrastructure; Justice and Human Rights; Legislative; Liaison with Poles Abroad; Local Self-Government and Regional Policy; Maritime Economy and Inland Navigation; National and Ethnic Minorities; National Defense; Physic Education and Sport; Public Finances; Rules and Deputies' Affairs; Senior Policy; Social Policy and Family; Special Services; State Control

Elections
- Voting system: Open-list proportional representation in 41 constituencies (5% national election threshold^{a})
- First election: 26 January 1919 (contemporary)
- Last election: 15 October 2023
- Next election: On or before 11 November 2027

Meeting place
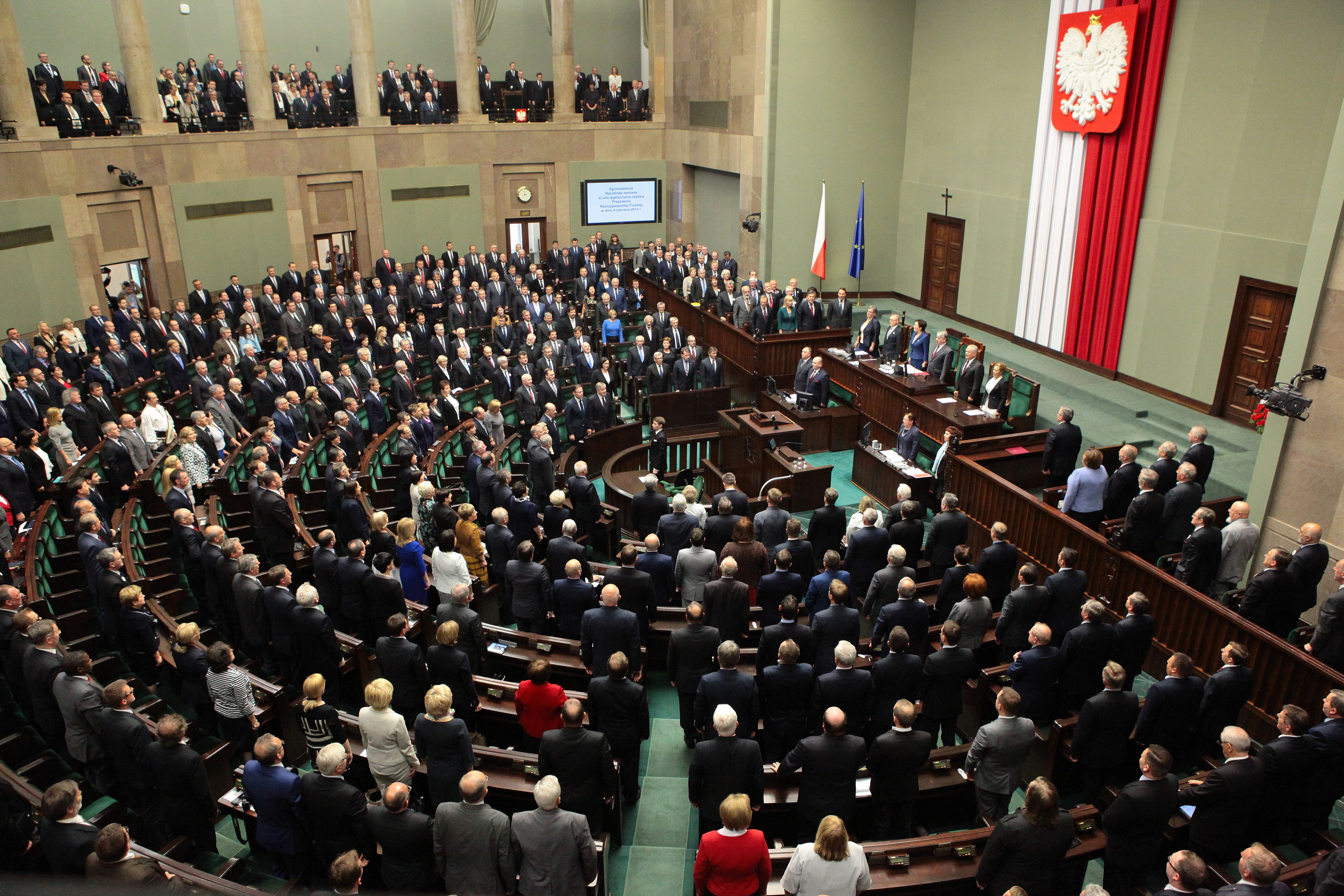
- The Sejm and Senate Complex, Warsaw

Website
- sejm.gov.pl

Constitution
- Constitution of the Republic of Poland

Rules
- Resolution of the Sejm of the Republic of Poland of 30 July 1992. Rules of Procedure of the Sejm of the Republic of Poland with subsequent amendments

Footnotes
- ^{a} 8% for coalitions, 0% for ethnic minority electoral committees

The Sejm (Polish: [sɛjm]), officially known as the Sejm of the Republic of Poland (Polish: Sejm Rzeczypospolitej Polskiej), is the lower house of the bicameral parliament of Poland.

The Sejm has been the highest governing body of the Third Polish Republic since the transition of government in 1989. Along with the upper house of parliament, the Senate, it forms the national legislature in Poland, known as the National Assembly (Polish: Zgromadzenie Narodowe). The Sejm comprises 460 deputies (singular poseł, rarely deputowany), elected every four years by universal ballot. The Sejm is presided over by a speaker, the Marshal of the Sejm (Marszałek Sejmu).

In the Kingdom of Poland, the term Sejm referred to the entire bicameral parliament, comprising the Chamber of Deputies (Izba Poselska) and the Senate, with the King presiding. It was thus a three-estate parliament. The 1573 Henrician Articles strengthened the assembly's jurisdiction, making Poland a constitutional elective monarchy. Since the Second Polish Republic (1918–1939), Sejm has referred only to the lower house of parliament.

During the existence of the Polish People's Republic, the Sejm, then a unicameral parliament, was the nominal supreme organ of state power in the country. However, in practice it was widely considered to be a rubber stamp legislature which existed to approve decisions made by the ruling party, the Polish United Workers' Party (PZPR), as a formality, and which had little or no real power of its own. With the collapse of communism in 1989, the Sejm was restored as the lower house of a bicameral, democratically elected parliament within a system of separation of powers between three branches, under the current Third Polish Republic.

== History ==
=== Kingdom of Poland ===
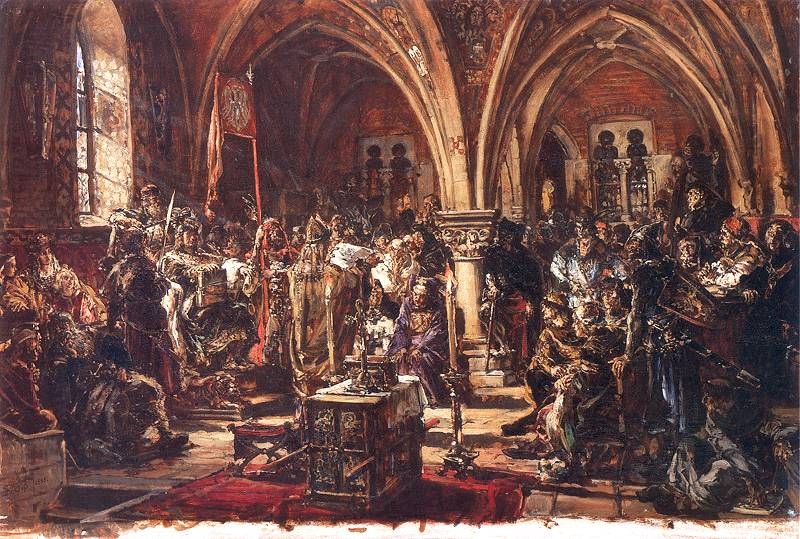
The first Sejm in Łęczyca. Recording of laws. A.D. 1180

Sejm (an ancient Proto-Lechitic word meaning "gathering" or "meeting") traces its roots to the King's Councils – wiece – which gained authority during the time of Poland's fragmentation (1146-1295). The 1180 Sejm in Łęczyca (known as the 'First Polish parliament') was the most notable, in that it established laws constraining the power of the ruler. It forbade arbitrary sequestration of supplies in the countryside and takeover of bishopric lands after the death of a bishop. These early Sejms only convened at the King's behest.

Following the 1493 Sejm in Piotrków, it became a regularly convening body, to which indirect elections were held every two years. The bicameral system was also established; the Sejm then comprised two chambers: the Senat (Senate) of 81 bishops and other dignitaries; and the Chamber of Deputies, made up of 54 envoys elected by smaller local sejmik (assemblies of landed nobility) in each of the Kingdom's provinces. At the time, Poland's nobility, which accounted for around 10% of the state's population (then the highest amount in Europe), was becoming particularly influential, and with the eventual development of the Golden Liberty, the Sejm's powers increased dramatically.

=== Polish–Lithuanian Commonwealth ===
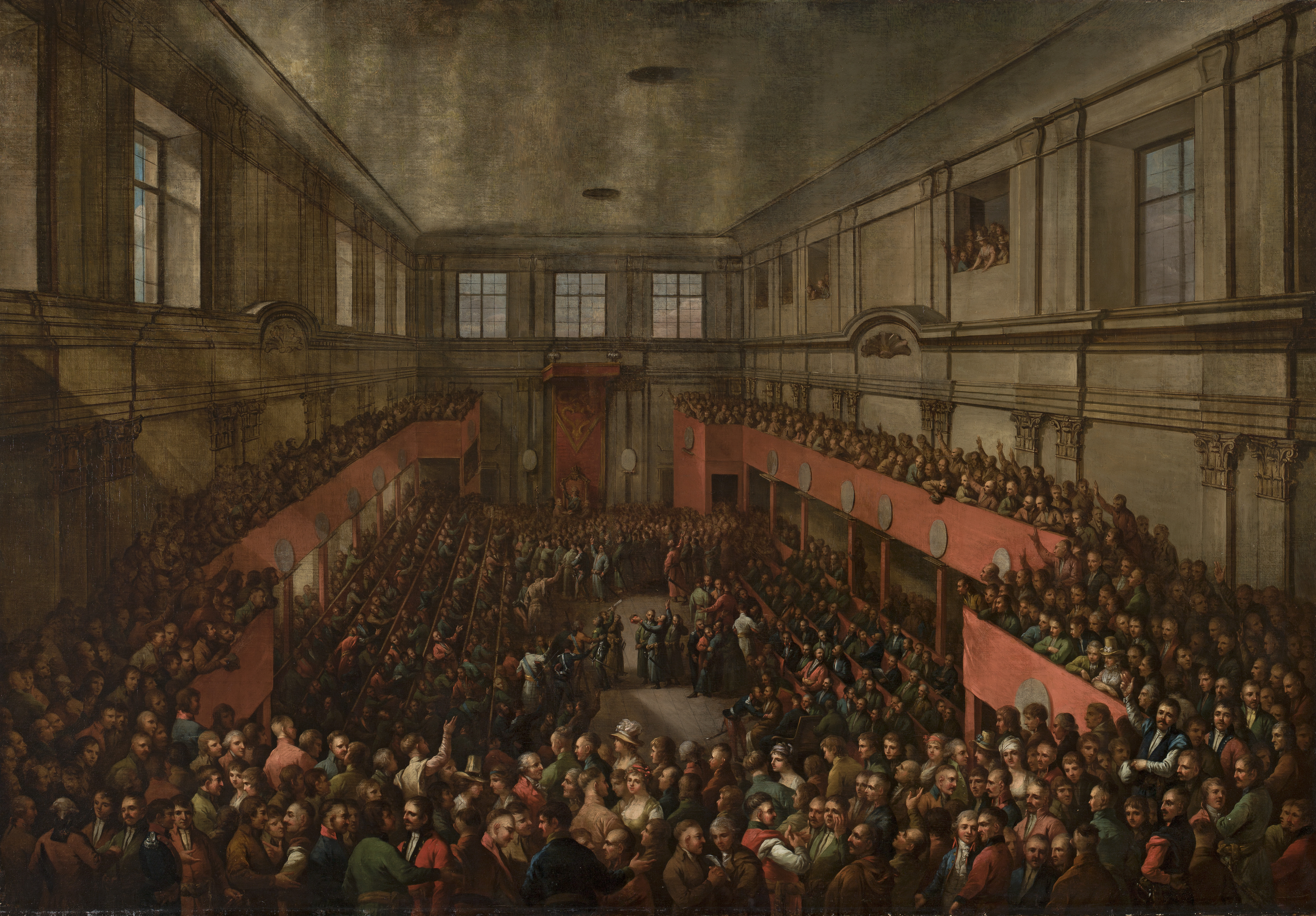
In 1791, the "Great Sejm" or Four-Year Sejm of 1788–1792 and Senate adopted the May 3rd Constitution at the Royal Castle in Warsaw

Over time, the envoys in the lower chamber grew in number and power as they pressed the king for more privileges. The Sejm eventually became even more active in supporting the goals of the privileged classes when the King ordered that the landed nobility and their estates (peasants) be drafted into military service.

The Union of Lublin in 1569, united the Kingdom of Poland and the Grand Duchy of Lithuania as one single state, the Polish–Lithuanian Commonwealth, and thus the Sejm was supplemented with new envoys from among the Lithuanian nobility. The Commonwealth ensured that the state of affairs surrounding the three-estates system continued, with the Sejm, Senate and King forming the estates and supreme deliberating body of the state. In the first few decades of the 16th century, the Senate had established its precedence over the Sejm; however, from the mid-1500s onwards, the Sejm became a very powerful representative body of the szlachta ("middle nobility"). Its chambers reserved the final decisions in legislation, taxation, budget, and treasury matters (including military funding), foreign policy, and the confirment of nobility.

The 1573 Warsaw Confederation saw the nobles of the Sejm officially sanction and guarantee religious tolerance in Commonwealth territory, ensuring a refuge for those fleeing the ongoing Reformation and Counter-Reformation wars in Europe.

Until the end of the 16th century, unanimity was not required, and the majority-voting process was the most commonly used system for voting. Later, with the rise of the Polish magnates and their increasing power, the unanimity principle was re-introduced with the institution of the nobility's right of liberum veto (Latin: "free veto"). Additionally, if the envoys were unable to reach a unanimous decision within six weeks (the time limit of a single session), deliberations were declared void and all previous acts passed by that Sejm were annulled. From the mid-17th century onward, any objection to a Sejm resolution, by either an envoy or a senator, automatically caused the rejection of other, previously approved resolutions. This was because all resolutions passed by a given session of the Sejm formed a whole resolution, and, as such, was published as the annual "constituent act" of the Sejm, e.g. the "Anno Domini 1667" act. In the 16th century, no single person or small group dared to hold up proceedings, but, from the second half of the 17th century, the liberum veto was used to virtually paralyze the Sejm, and brought the Commonwealth to the brink of collapse.

The liberum veto was abolished with the adoption of the Constitution of 3 May 1791, a piece of legislation which was passed as the "Government Act", and for which the Sejm required four years to propagate and adopt. The constitution's acceptance, and the possible long-term consequences it may have had, is arguably the reason that the powers of Habsburg Austria, Russia and Prussia then decided to partition the Polish–Lithuanian Commonwealth, thus putting an end to over 300 years of Polish parliamentary continuity. It is estimated that between 1493 and 1793, a Sejm was held 240 times, the total debate-time sum of which was 44 years.

=== Partitions ===
After the fall of the Duchy of Warsaw, which existed as a Napoleonic client state between 1807 and 1815, and its short-lived Sejm of the Duchy of Warsaw, the Sejm of Congress Poland was established in Congress Poland of the Russian Empire; it was composed of the king (the Russian emperor), the upper house (Senate), and the lower house (Chamber of Deputies). Overall, during the period from 1795 until the re-establishment of Poland's sovereignty in 1918, little power was actually held by any Polish legislative body and the occupying powers of Russia, Prussia (later united Germany) and Austria propagated legislation for their own respective formerly-Polish territories at a national level.

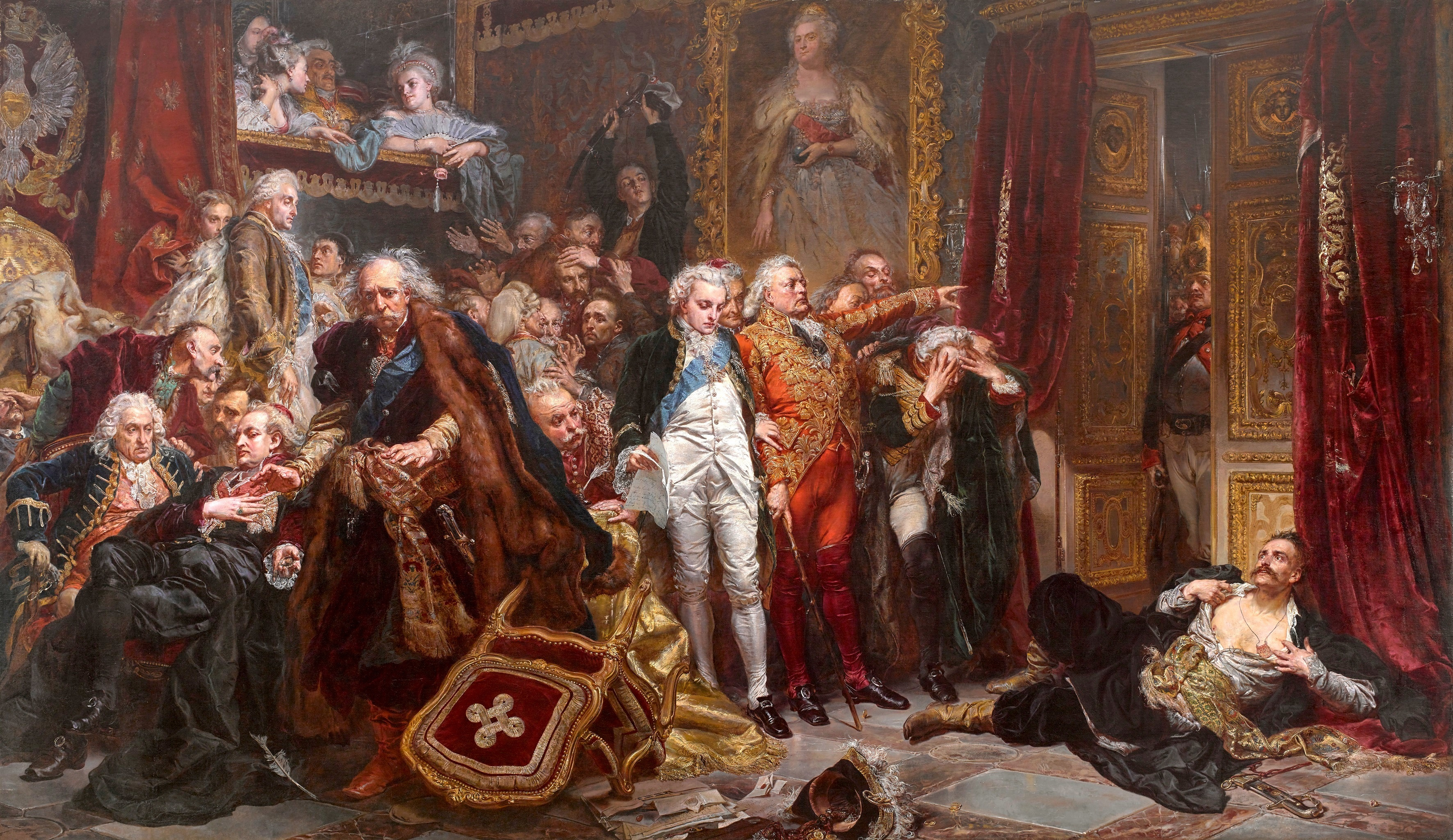
Tadeusz Rejtan tries to prevent the legalisation of the first partition of Poland by preventing the members of the Sejm from leaving the chamber (1773). Painting by Jan Matejko

==== Congress Poland ====
The Chamber of Deputies, despite its name, consisted not only of 77 envoys (sent by local assemblies) from the hereditary nobility, but also of 51 deputies, elected by the non-noble population. All deputies were covered by Parliamentary immunity, with each individual serving for a term of office of six years, with third of the deputies being elected every two years. Candidates for deputy had to be able to read and write, and have a certain amount of wealth. The legal voting age was 21, except for those citizens serving in the military, the personnel of which were not allowed to vote. Parliamentary sessions were initially convened every two years, and lasted for (at least) 30 days. However, after many clashes between liberal deputies and conservative government officials, sessions were later called only four times (1818, 1820, 1826, and 1830, with the last two sessions being secret). The Sejm had the right to call for votes on civil and administrative legal issues, and, with permission from the king, it could also vote on matters related to the fiscal policy and the military. It had the right to exercise control over government officials, and to file petitions. The 64-member Senate on the other hand, was composed of voivodes and kasztelans (both types of provincial governors), Russian envoys, diplomats or princes, and nine bishops. It acted as the Parliamentary Court, had the right to control "citizens' books", and had similar legislative rights as did the Chamber of Deputies.

==== Germany and Austria-Hungary ====
In the Free City of Cracow (1815–1846), a unicameral Assembly of Representatives was established, and from 1827, a unicameral provincial sejm existed in the Grand Duchy of Poznań. Poles were elected to and represented the majority in both of these legislatures; however, they were largely powerless institutions and exercised only very limited power. After numerous failures in securing legislative sovereignty in the early 19th century, many Poles simply gave up trying to attain a degree of independence from their foreign master-states. In the Austrian partition, a relatively powerless Sejm of the Estates operated until the time of the Spring of Nations. After this, in the mid to late 19th century, only in autonomous Galicia (1861–1914) was there a unicameral and functional National Sejm, the Sejm of the Land. It is recognised today as having played a major and overwhelming positive role in the development of Polish national institutions.

In the second half of the 19th century, Poles were able to become members of the parliaments of Austria, Prussia and Russia, where they formed Polish Clubs. Deputies of Polish nationality were elected to the Prussian Landtag from 1848, and then to the German Empire's Reichstag from 1871. Polish Deputies were members of the Austrian State Council (from 1867), and from 1906 were also elected to the Russian Imperial State Duma (lower chamber) and to the State Council (upper chamber).

=== Second Polish Republic ===
After the First World War and re-establishment of Polish independence, the convocation of parliament, under the democratic electoral law of 1918, became an enduring symbol of the new state's wish to demonstrate and establish continuity with the 300-year Polish parliamentary traditions established before the time of the partitions. Maciej Rataj emphatically paid tribute to this with the phrase: "There is Poland there, and so is the Sejm".

During the interwar period of Poland's independence, the first Legislative Sejm of 1919, a Constituent Assembly, passed the Small Constitution of 1919, which introduced a parliamentary republic and proclaimed the principle of the Sejm's sovereignty. This was then strengthened, in 1921, by the March Constitution, one of the most democratic European constitutions enacted after the end of World War I. The constitution established a political system which was based on Montesquieu's doctrine of separation of powers, and which restored the bicameral Sejm consisting of a chamber of deputies (to which alone the name of "Sejm" was from then on applied) and the Senate. In 1919 Jadwiga Dziubińska became the first woman ever to become elected to the Sejm.

The legal content of the March Constitution allowed for Sejm supremacy in the system of state institutions at the expense of the executive powers, thus creating a parliamentary republic out of the Polish state. An attempt to strengthen executive powers in 1926 (through the August Amendment) proved too limited and largely failed in helping avoid legislative grid-lock which had ensued as a result of too-great parliamentary power in a state which had numerous diametrically-opposed political parties sitting in its legislature. In 1935, the parliamentary republic was weakened further when, by way of, Józef Piłsudski's May Coup, the president was forced to sign the April Constitution of 1935, an act through which the head of state assumed the dominant position in legislating for the state and the Senate increased its power at the expense of the Sejm.

On 2 September 1939, the Sejm held its final pre-war session, during which it declared Poland's readiness to defend itself against invading German forces. On 2 November 1939, the President dissolved the Sejm and the Senate, which were then, according to plan, to resume their activity within two months after the end of the Second World War; this, however, never happened. During wartime, the National Council (1939–1945) was established to represent the legislature as part of the Polish Government in Exile. Meanwhile, in Nazi-occupied Poland, the Council of National Unity was set up; this body functioned from 1944 to 1945 as the parliament of the Polish Underground State. With the cessation of hostilities in 1945, and subsequent rise to power of the Communist-backed Provisional Government of National Unity, the Second Polish Republic legally ceased to exist.

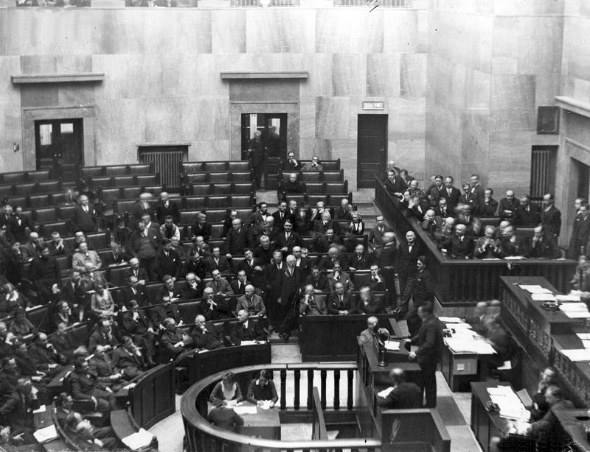
Stanisław Dubois speaking to envoys and diplomats in the Sejm, 1931

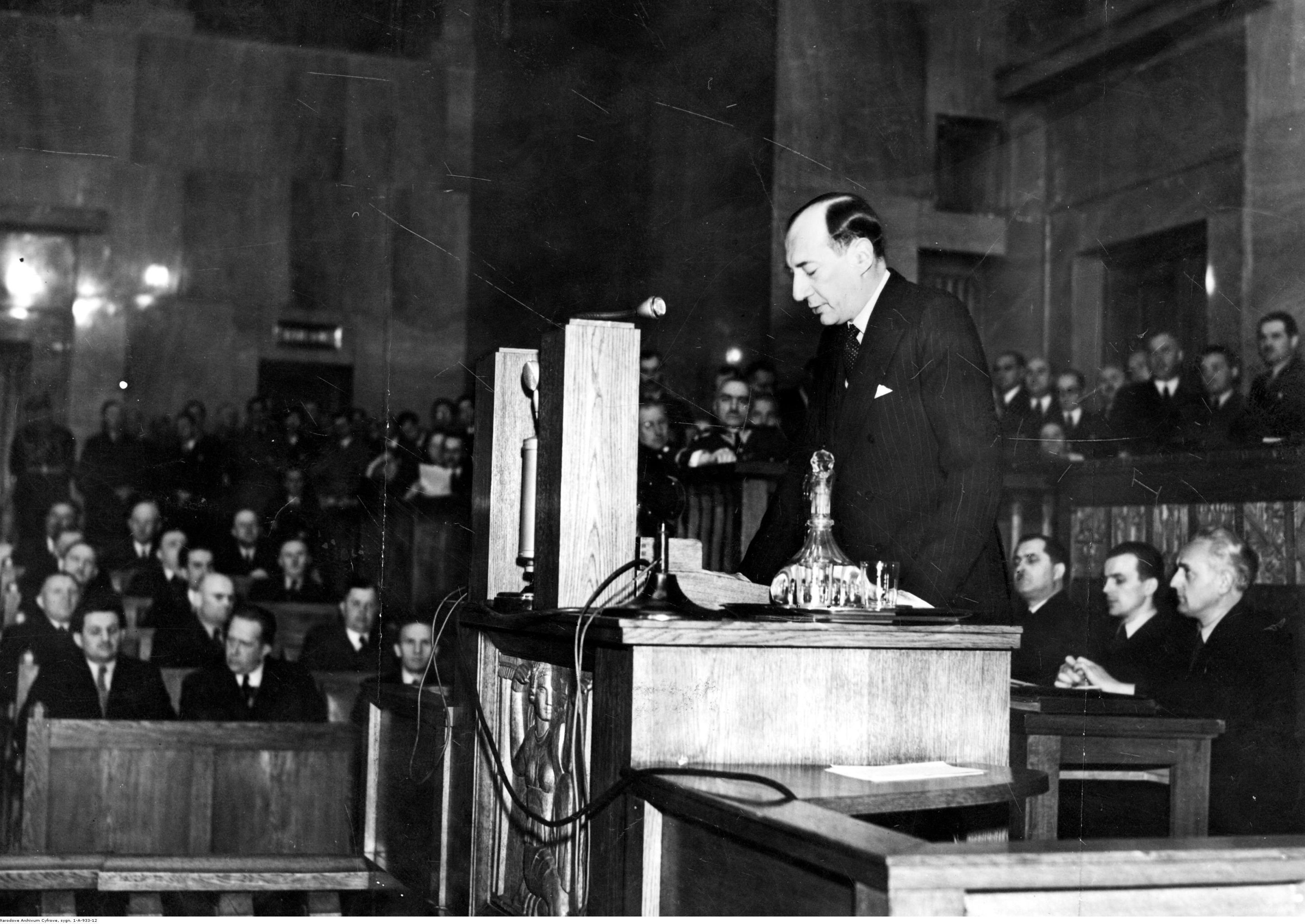
Józef Beck, Minister of Foreign Affairs, delivers his famous Honour Speech in the Sejm, 5 May 1939.

=== Polish People's Republic ===
The Sejm in the Polish People's Republic had 460 deputies throughout most of its history. At first, this number was declared to represent one deputy per 60,000 citizens (425 were elected in 1952), but, in 1960, as the population grew, the declaration was changed: The constitution then stated that the deputies were representative of the people and could be recalled by the people, but this article was never used, and, instead of the "five-point electoral law", a non-proportional, "four-point" version was used. Legislation was passed with majority voting.

Under the 1952 Constitution, the Sejm, defined as "the highest organ of State authority" in Poland as well as "the highest spokesman of the will of the people in town and country", was the only government branch in the state, and all state organs were subservient to it. On paper, it was vested with great lawmaking and oversight powers. For instance, it was empowered with control over "the functioning of other organs of State authority and administration," and ministers were required to answer questions posed by deputies within seven days. In practice, it did little more than rubber-stamp decisions already made by the Communist Polish United Workers' Party and its executive bodies. This was standard practice in nearly all Communist regimes due to the principled of unified power and democratic centralism.

The Sejm voted on the budget and on the periodic national plans that were a fixture of communist economies. The Sejm deliberated in sessions that were ordered to convene by the State Council.

The Sejm also chose a Prezydium ("presiding body") from among its members. The Prezydium was headed by the speaker, or Marshal, who was always a member of the United People's Party. In its preliminary session, the Sejm also nominated the Prime Minister, the Council of Ministers of Poland, and members of the State Council. It also chose many other government officials, including the head of the Supreme Chamber of Control and members of the State Tribunal and the Constitutional Tribunal, as well as the Ombudsman (the last three bodies of which were created in the 1980s).

When the Sejm was not in session, the State Council had the power to issue decrees that had the force of law. However, those decrees had to be approved by the Sejm at its next session. In practice, the principles of democratic centralism meant that such approval was only a formality.

The Senate was abolished by the referendum in 1946, after which the Sejm became the sole legislative body in Poland. Even though the Sejm was largely subservient to the Communist party, one deputy, Romuald Bukowski (an independent) voted against the imposition of martial law in 1982.

=== Third Polish Republic ===
After the end of communism in 1989, the Senate was reinstated as the second house of a bicameral national assembly, while the Sejm remained the first house. The Sejm is now composed of 460 deputies elected by proportional representation every four years.

Between 7 and 20 deputies are elected from each constituency using the d'Hondt method (with one exception, in 2001, when the Sainte-Laguë method was used), their number being proportional to their constituency's population. Additionally, a threshold is used, so that candidates are chosen only from parties that gained at least 5% of the nationwide vote (candidates from ethnic-minority parties are exempt from this threshold).

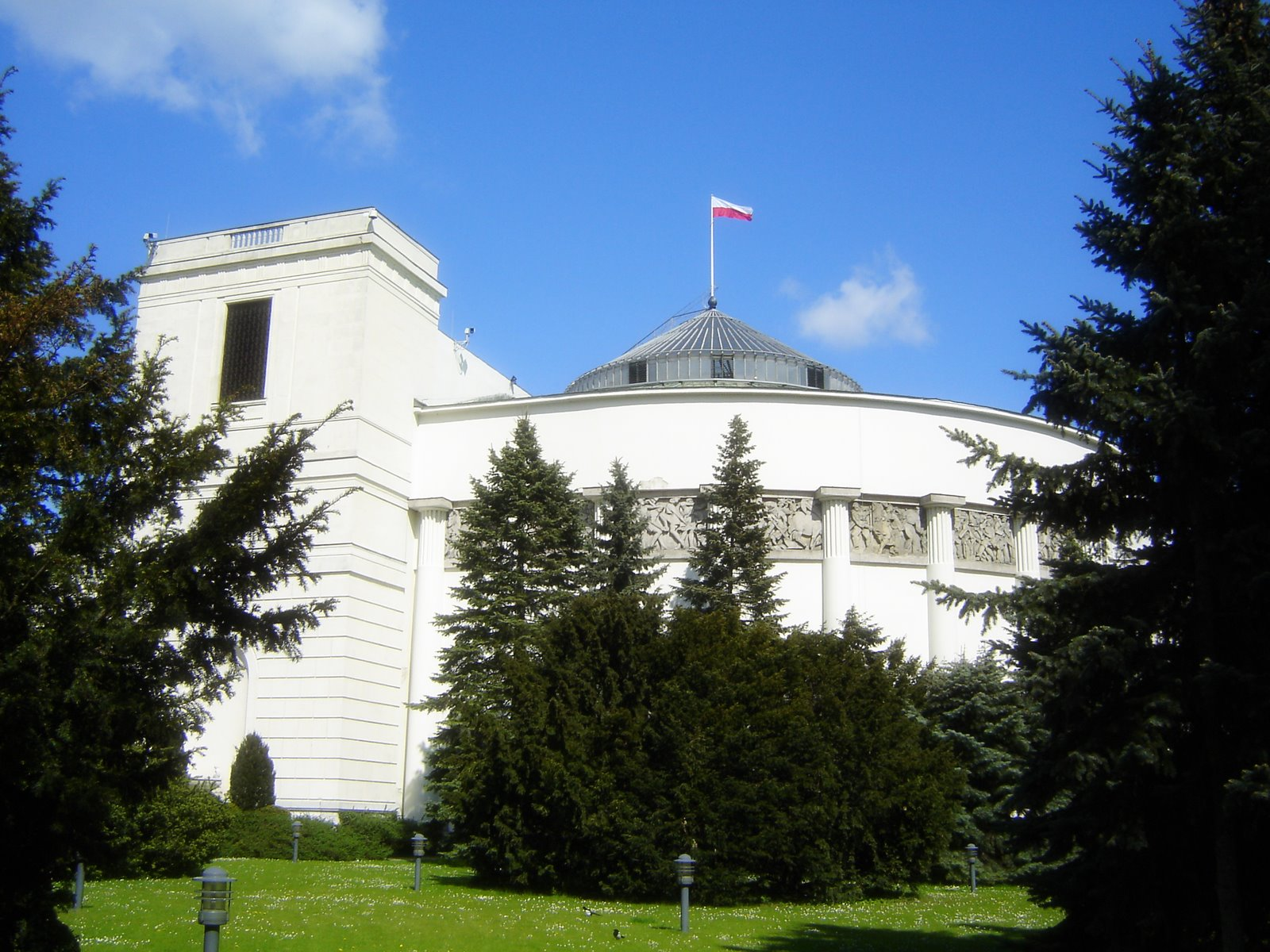
The Sejm building in Warsaw

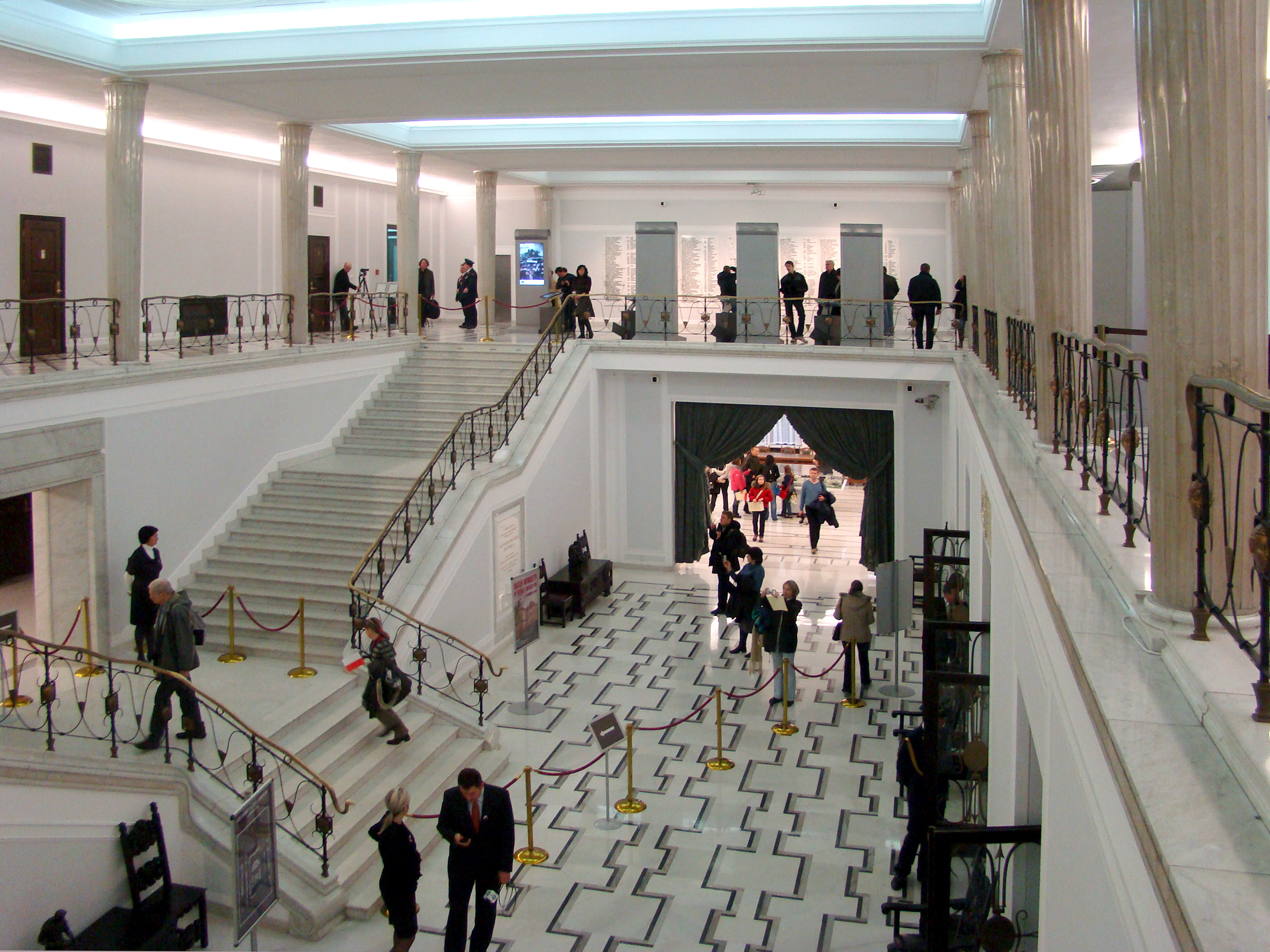
The Sejm's main hall

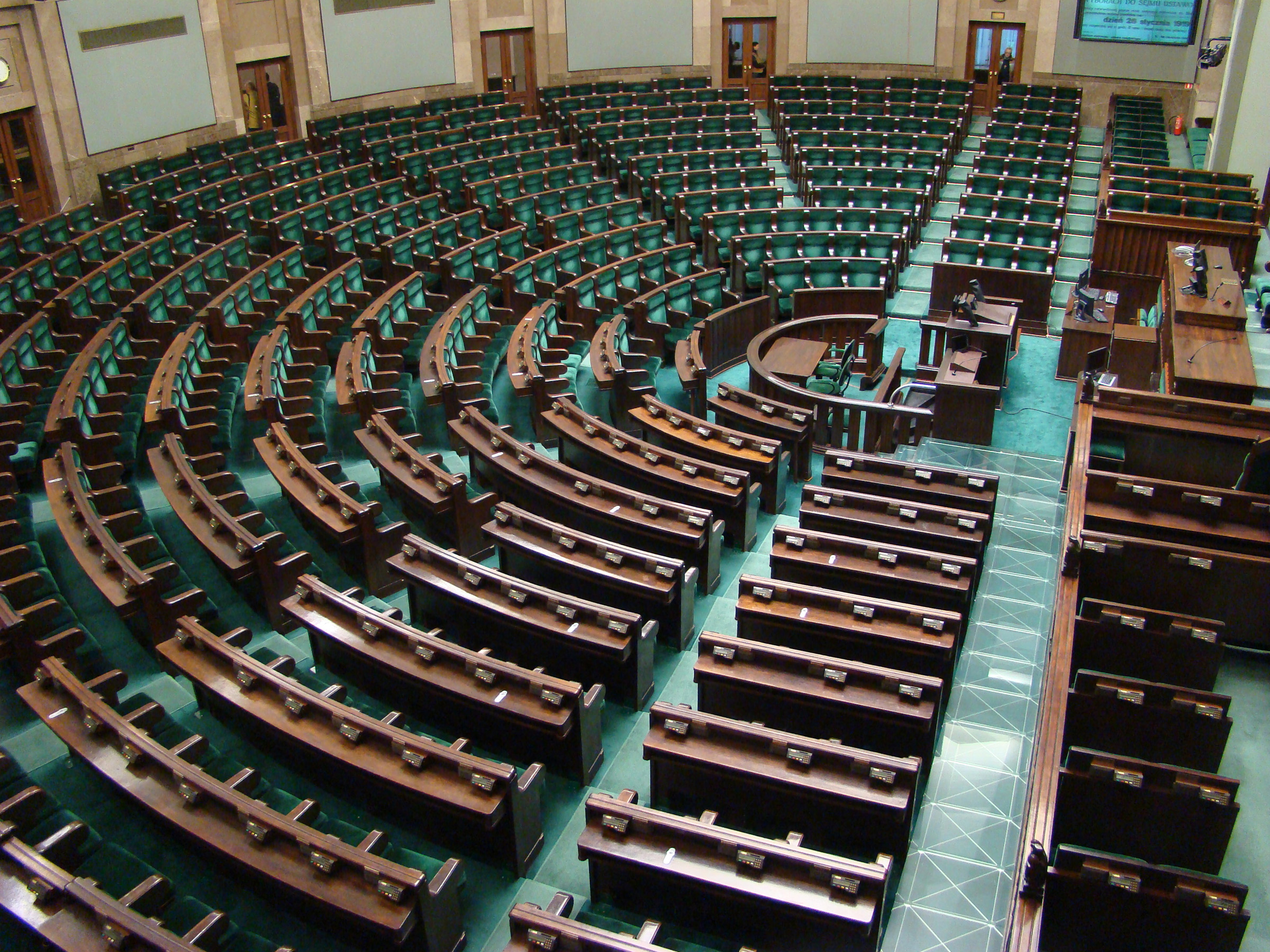
Sessions chamber in the Sejm

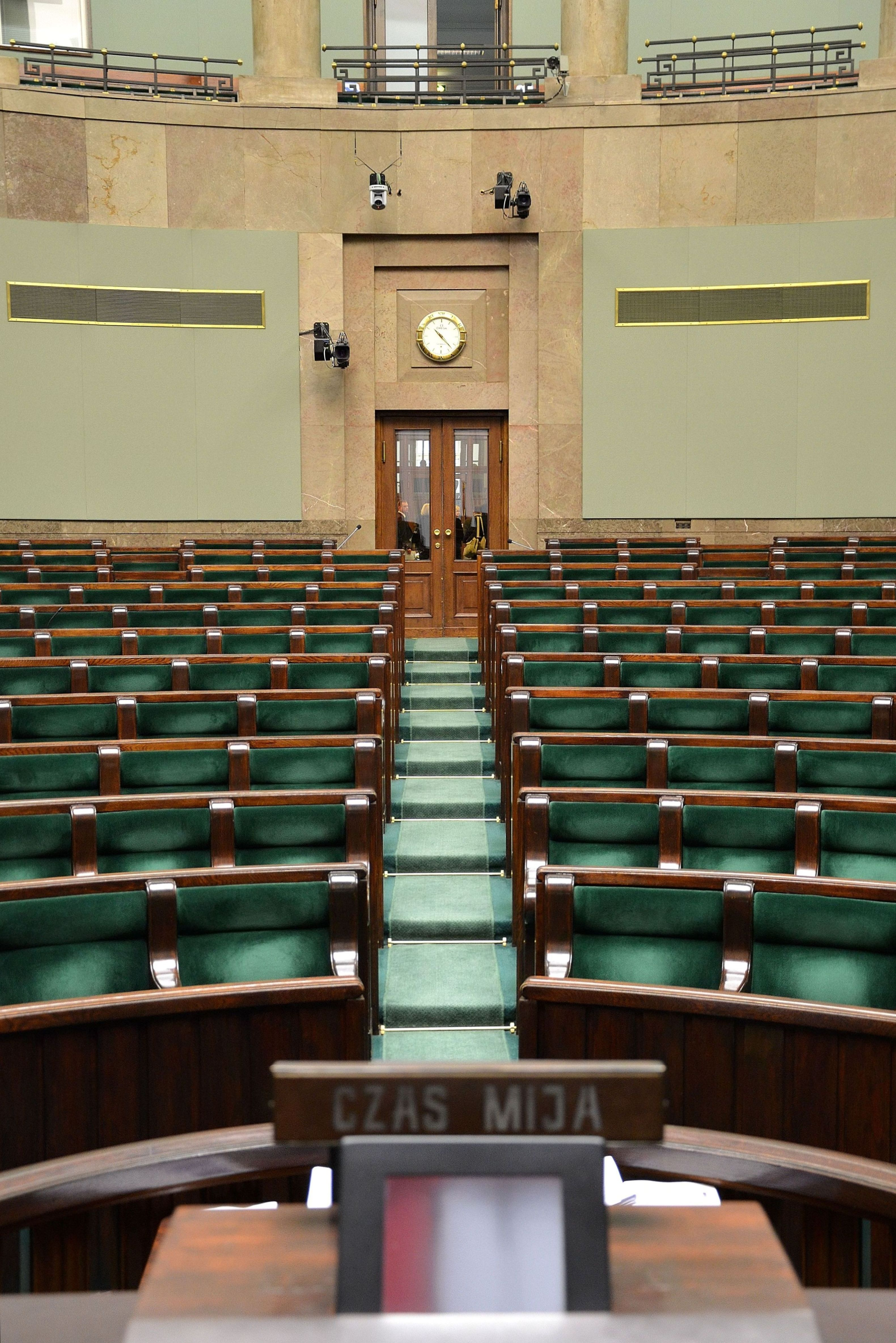
Sessions chamber viewed from the rostrum

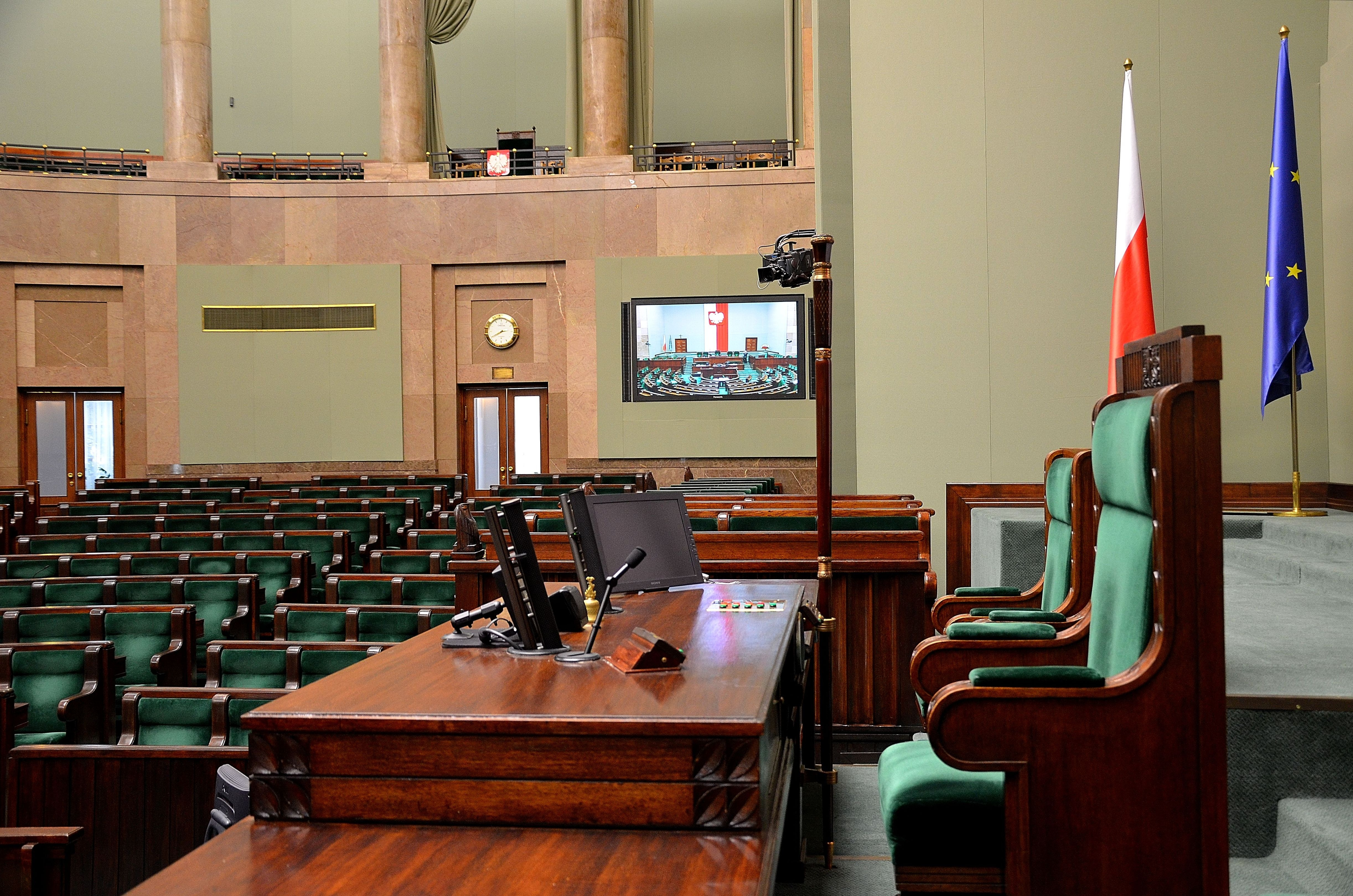
Marshal's chair in the sessions chamber

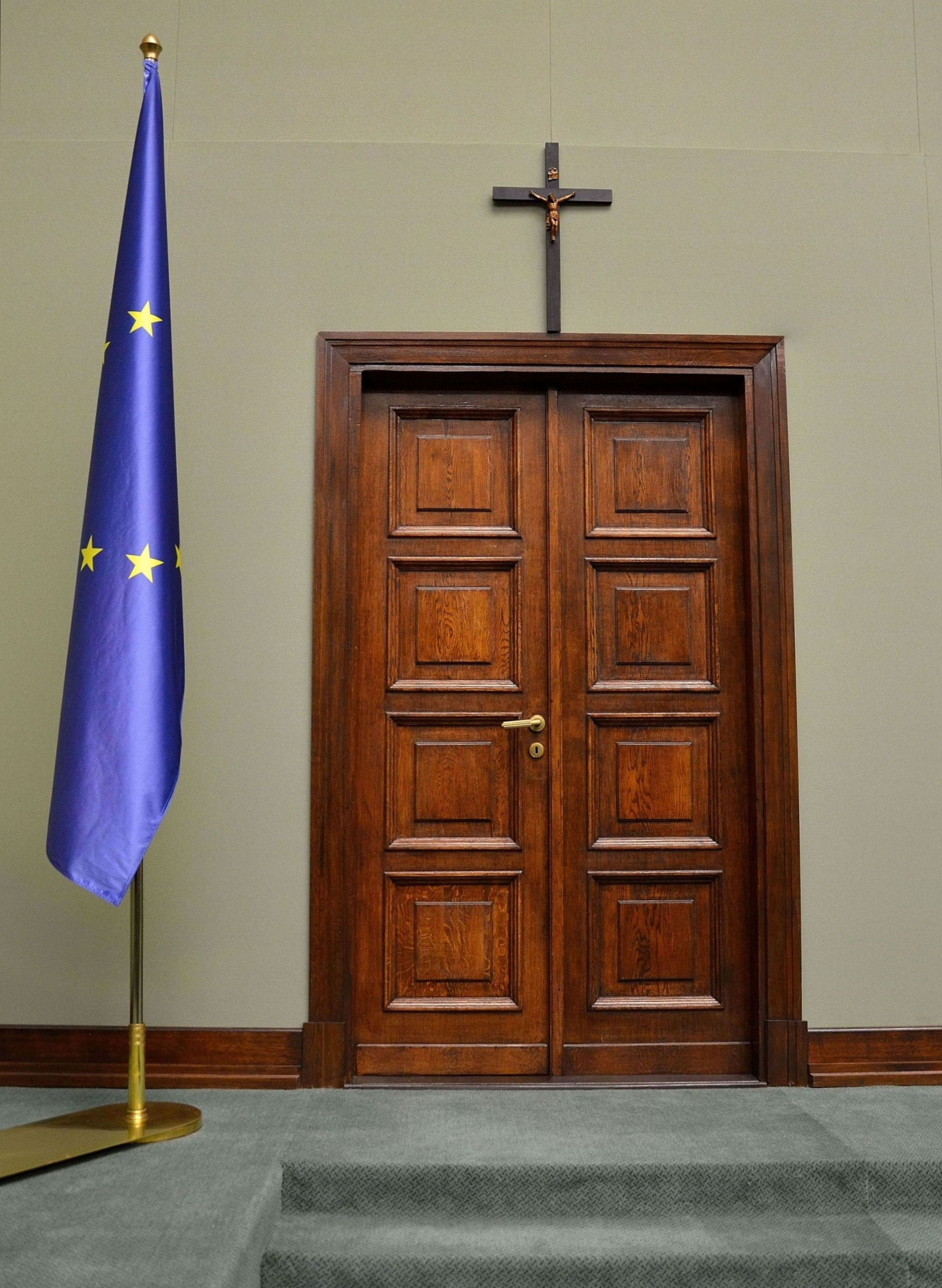
Sejm cross

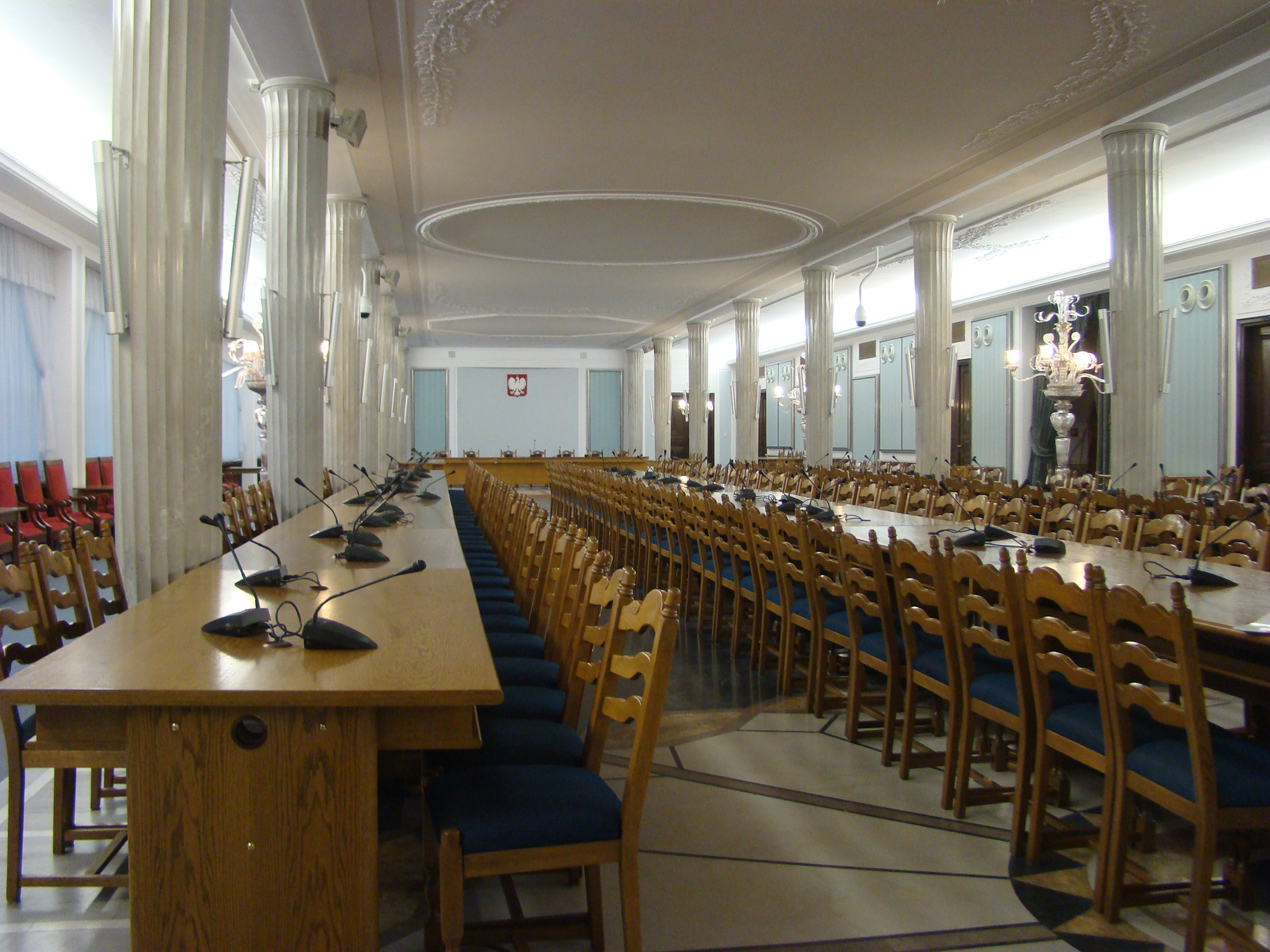
Column hall in the Sejm

== Historical composition of the Sejm ==
=== Second Republic (1918–1939) ===
KPP / PPS / NZR / NPR / SCh / Centrolew / PSL "L" / PSL "W" / PSL "P" / PZL / Minorities / Jews / Germans / Ukrainians / Others/Independent / Catholic Bloc / SKL / ZLN/ChZJN / BBWR / OZN / SN
1919	35 / 32 / 12 / 59 / 46 / 35 / 11 / 2 / 4 / 18 / 140
1922	2 / 41 / 18 / 2 / 49 / 70 / 66 / 18 / 5 / 10 / 163
1928	5 / 64 / 11 / 26 / 40 / 55 / 6 / 17 / 23 / 34 / 38 / 125
1930	4 / 79 / 5 / 7 / 21 / 2 / 14 / 249 / 63
1935	25 / 181
1938	5 / 18 / 21 / 164

=== PRL (1945–1989) ===
PPR / PZPR / PPS / SL/ZSL / PSL "NW" / SD / PSL / Independent / KO "S" / SP / PAX / ChSS / PZKS / Znak
1947	114 / 116 / 109 / 7 / 41 / 28 / 3 / 12
1952	273 / 90 / 25 / 37
1957	239 / 118 / 39 / 58 / 5
1961	256 / 117 / 39 / 37 / 3 / 3 / 5
1965	255 / 117 / 39 / 36 / 5 / 3 / 5
1969	255 / 117 / 39 / 37 / 5 / 2 / 5
1972	255 / 117 / 39 / 37 / 5 / 2 / 5
1976	261 / 113 / 37 / 37 / 5 / 2 / 5
1980	261 / 113 / 37 / 32 / 7 / 5 / 5
1985	245 / 106 / 35 / 53 / 9 / 7 / 5
1989	173 / 76 / 27 / 161 / 10 / 8 / 5

=== Third Republic (since 1989) ===
SRP / UP / SLD / NL / "S" / RP / PSL (Note: PSL was a left-wing party until about 2008, and shifted towards the centre-right afterwards.) / TD / Germans / BBWR / PO / KO / UD / UW / Others / .N / KLD / AWS / PPPP / PL / PC / ZChN / PiS / K'15 / KPN / Konf / LPR
1991	60 / 27 / 48 / 7 / 36 / 62 / 16 / 37 / 28 / 44 / 49 / 46
1993	41 / 171 / 132 / 4 / 16 / 74 / 22
1997	164 / 27 / 2 / 6 / 60 / 201
2001	53 / 216 / 42 / 2 / 65 / 44 / 38
2005	56 / 55 / 25 / 2 / 133 / 155 / 34
2007	53 / 31 / 1 / 209 / 166
2011	27 / 40 / 1 / 207 / 28 / 157
2015	1 / 138 / 16 / 28 / 235 / 42
2019	49 / 1 / 134 / 30 / 235 / 11
2023	26 / 157 / 65 / 194 / 18

== Standing committees ==
The Sejm has several standing committees with responsibilities in particular areas.

Permanent committees
- Administration and Internal Affairs
- Agriculture and Rural Development
- Constitutional Accountability
- Culture and Media
- Deputies' Ethics
- Digitization, Innovation and Modern Technology
- Economy and Development
- Education, Science and Youth
- Energy, Climate and State Assets
- Environment Protection, Natural Resources and Forestry
- European Union Affairs
- Foreign Affairs
- Health
- Infrastructure
- Justice and Human Rights
- Legislative
- Liaison with Poles Abroad
- Local Self-Government and Regional Policy
- Maritime Economy and Inland Navigation
- National and Ethnic Minorities
- National Defense
- Petition
- Physical Education and Sport
- Public Finances
- Rules and Deputies' Affairs
- Senior Policy
- Social Policy and Family
- Special Services
- State Control

Extraordinary committees

- For changes in codification
- To consider draft laws regarding the right to terminate pregnancy

Investigative committees

- To investigate the legality, correctness, and purposefulness of actions taken with the goal of preparing and holding the Polish Presidential Elections in 2020 in the form of postal voting
- To investigate the legality, correctness and purposefulness of actions, as well as the occurrence of abuse, neglect, and omissions regarding the legalisation of stay for foreigners within the territory of the Republic of Poland between 12 November 2019 and 20 November 2023
- To investigate the legality, correctness, and purposefulness of operational and reconnaissance activities taken among others with the use of the "Pegasus" software by the members of the council of ministers, special forces, police, tax control authorities and customs control authorities, bodies established to prosecute criminals, and the proscecutor's office between 16 November 2015 and 20 November 2023

== Current standings ==
Standings in the 10th Sejm and the 11th Senate
Affiliation	Deputies (Sejm)			Senators (Senate)		
Affiliation	Results of the 2023 election	As of 13 November 2026	Change	Results of the 2023 election	As of 13 November 2026	Change
Parliamentary clubs
Civic Coalition	157	156	▼1	41	42	▲1
Law and Justice	194	146	▼48	34	31	▼3
Development Plus	—	41	▲41	—	2	▲2
Polish Coalition	32	32	Steady	11	8	▼3
Poland 2050	33	15	▼18	11	8	▼3
Centre	—	15	▲15	part of Senatorial Club New Poland-Centre		
The Left	26	21	▼5	9	8	▼1
Deputative clubs
Confederation	18	16	▼2	—	—	Steady
Deputative caucuses
Razem	—	4	▲4	—	—	Steady
Direct Democracy	—	4	▲4	—	—	Steady
Confederation of the Polish Crown	—	3	▲3	—	—	Steady
Senatorial clubs
New Poland-Centre	—	—	Steady	—	6	▲6
Independents
Independents	—	7	▲7	5	2	▼3
Total members	460	460	Steady	100	99	▼1
Vacant	—	0	Steady	—	1	▲1
Total seats	460			100		

== See also ==
- Electoral districts of Poland (1935–1939)
- Polish constitutional crisis, 2015
- National Assembly of the Republic of Poland (Zgromadzenie Narodowe)

=== Types of sejm ===
- Confederated sejm (Sejm skonfederowany)
- Convocation sejm (Sejm konwokacyjny)
- Coronation sejm (Sejm koronacyjny)
- Election sejm (Sejm elekcyjny)
- Sejmik
  - Voivodeship sejmik (Sejmik wojewódzki)

=== Notable sejms ===
- Silent Sejm (Sejm Niemy 1717)
- Convocation Sejm (1764) (Sejm konwokacyjny)
- Repnin Sejm (Sejm Repninowski 1767–1768)
- Partition Sejm (Sejm rozbiorowy 1773–1776)
- Great Sejm (Sejm Wielki 1788–1792)
- Grodno Sejm (Sejm grodzieński 1791)
- Silesian Sejm (Sejm Śląski 1920–1939)
- Contract Sejm (Sejm Kontraktowy 1989)
