= Moczydlowski =

Moczydłowski, feminine: Moczydłowska, is a Polish-language surname. Notable people with this surname include:

- Maria Moczydłowska (1886 – 1969), Polish educator and politician.
- Paweł Moczydłowski, Polish sociologist, criminologist, journalist and state official
