= Supreme National Committee =

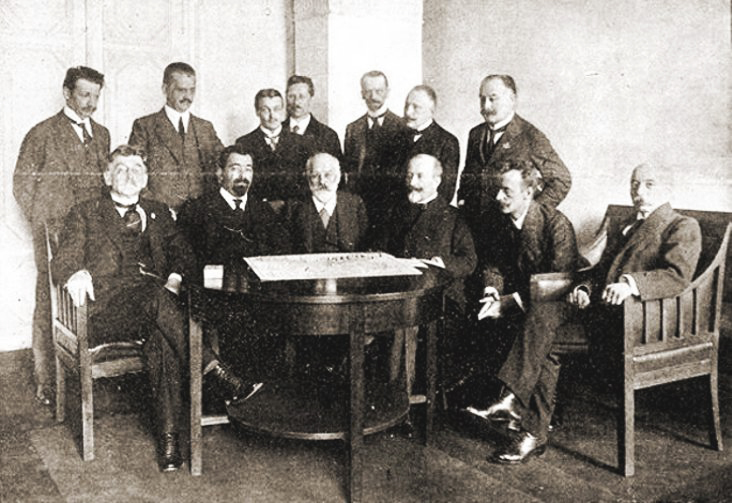
Supreme National Committee, 1914

The Supreme National Committee (Polish: Naczelny Komitet Narodowy, NKN) was a quasi-government during World War I in Austro-Hungarian Galicia from 1914 to 1917.

== History ==
Created on 16 August 1914, the Supreme National Committee replaced the Temporary Commission of Confederated Independence Parties (Komisja Tymczasowa Skonfederowanych Stronnictw Niepodległościowych) and the Central National Committee (Centralny Komitet Narodowy), gaining support from Polish conservatives and National Democrats; but over time it lost much of its early support mainly due to its strong pro-Austrian stance and was replaced in 1917 by a Regency Council.

== Key members ==
- Presidents: Juliusz Leo; Władysław Leopold Jaworski; Leon Biliński
- Military: Władysław Sikorski; Józef Piłsudski
- Others: Tadeusz Cieński.
