= Juliusz Leo =

Polish jurist and politician (1861–1918)

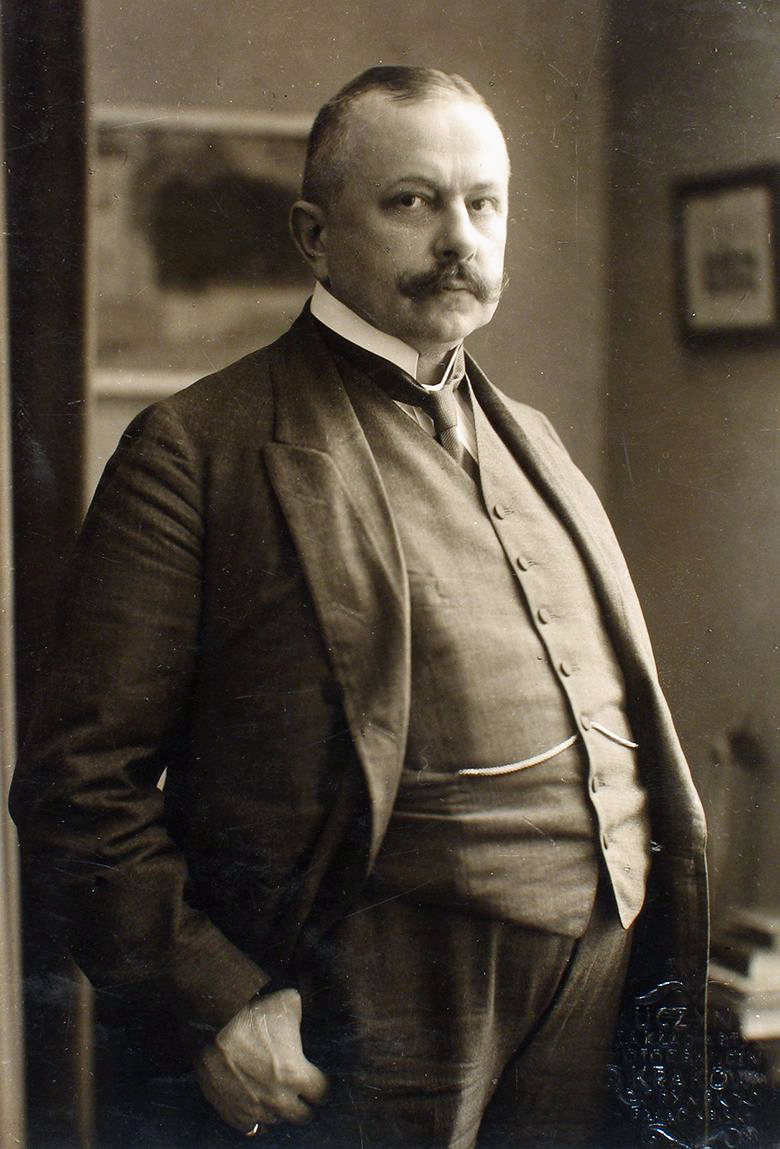
Juliusz Leo

Juliusz Franciszek Leo (15 September 1861 - 21 February 1918) was a Polish politician and academic from Kraków, Poland, while the city was part of the Austrian Empire, then Austria-Hungary. Leo was a professor of economics and law at Jagiellonian University, Kraków, the city's first deputy mayor from 1901 to 1904, then mayor from 1904 for three terms until his death. He was the founder and first president of Supreme National Committee (Naczelny Komitet Narodowy), a Polish independence organization, and he was a supporter of the idea of Polish Legions. Leo was buried at Rakowicki Cemetery.

One of Krakow's streets in the Krowodrza district (also known as District No. 5) was named after Juliusz Leo.

== Notes and references ==
- Dominika Hołuj, Rola samorządu terytorialnego w kształtowaniu procesu rozwoju Miasta Krakowa w okresie autonomii (1866-1918). „Zeszyty naukowe Wyższej Szkoły Ekonomicznej w Bochni”. Nr 5. Pg. 50.
