= National People's Union =

National People's Union Narodowe Zjednoczenie Ludowe
- Leader: Leopold Skulski
- Split from: Popular National Union; Polish People's Union
- Succeeded by: Polish Centre
- Ideology: Agrarianism; Moderate conservatism
- Political position: Centre-right

The National People's Union (Polish: Narodowe Zjednoczenie Ludowe, NZL) was a political party in Poland.

== History ==
The party was established in July 1919 by former members of the Polish People's Union and the Popular National Union. It formed part of the Polish Centre alliance for the 1922 elections, in which the alliance won six seats.

In August 1923 it merged into one of the peasant parties.
