= Władysław Leopold Jaworski =

Polish jurist and politician (1865–1930)

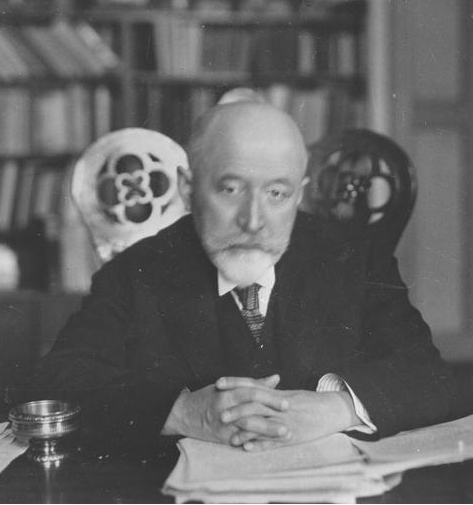
Władysław Leopold Jaworski

Władysław Leopold Jaworski (1865 – 1930) was a Polish jurist and politician.

He studied law in Kraków, Berlin and Paris, and assumed a professorship of civil law in Cracow in 1897. An adherent of the conservative party, he was elected to the Diet of Galicia in 1901 and to the Council of State in Vienna in 1911. When World War I broke out, he headed the Supreme National Committee, a Polish government in Galicia.

In 1918, Jaworski resigned from politics to focus on his legal scholarship. His broad writings include several monographs on the civil and administrative law of Austria-Hungary and Poland.
