= Państwowe Zjednoczenie na Kresach =

Defunct Political Party Poland

Państwowe Zjednoczenie na Kresach (lit. 'State Unity in the Kresy', PZK) was a political party in Poland.

== History ==
Despite an endorsement by Chief of State Józef Piłsudski, the party received around 1% of the vote in the 1922 elections, winning one seat in the Senate. Its single seat was taken by Leon Łubieński.

The party did not contest the next elections in 1928, with Łubieński running as a candidate of the Nonpartisan Bloc for Cooperation with the Government.
