= Catholic People's Party (Poland) =

Catholic People's Party Stronnictwo Katolicko-Ludowe
- Founded: 1918
- Dissolved: 1937
- Headquarters: Galicia, Poland
- Ideology: Political catholicism Christian Democracy
- Political position: Centre-right

The Catholic People's Party (Polish: Stronnictwo Katolicko-Ludowe, SKL) was a political party in Poland.

== History ==
The party contested the January 1919 elections to elect the first Sejm of the Second Polish Republic. It received 1.8% of the vote, winning 18 seats. It contested the 1922 elections as part of the Polish Centre alliance.
