= Confederate States peace commission =

The Confederate States peace commission was agreed to on February 15, 1861 in a resolution adopted by the newly-formed Confederate Congress that empowered Confederate President-elect Jefferson Davis to appoint a commission of three men to negotiate "friendly relations" with the United States.

On February 25, Davis, the newly-inaugurated Confederate President, chose Martin J. Crawford of Georgia, John Forsyth of Alabama, and Andre B. Roman of Louisiana to serve as commissioners.

On February 27, Davis wrote a letter to US President-elect Abraham Lincoln to introduce the commissioners as representatives of the Confederate States government. The commission was not received by Lincoln.

On March 12, a letter was sent to William H. Seward, US Secretary of State, to introduce the commissioners and to explain their peaceful intent. The commission was not received by Seward.

On March 15, the commission filed a memorandum, which outlined how they had been ignored by Seward and Lincoln. The commissioners had been rejected because their acceptance would have meant recognition of the Confederate States.
