= Bloc of National Minorities =

Bloc of National Minorities Blok Mniejszości Narodowych (Polish) Блёк нацыянальных меньшасьцяў (Belarusian) Блок національних меншин (Ukrainian) Block der Nationalen Minderheiten (German)
- Founded: 1922
- Dissolved: 1930
- Headquarters: Warsaw, Poland
- Ideology: Minority politics Ethnic minority interests Regionalism; Federalism
- Political position: Centre

The Bloc of National Minorities (Note: Polish: Blok Mniejszości Narodowych, (Polish pronunciation: [ˈblɔɡ mɲɛjˈʂɔɕtɕi narɔˈdɔvɨx], BMN; Belarusian: Блёк нацыянальных меньшасьцяў, Bliok nacyjanałnych mieńšaściaŭ; Ukrainian: Блок національних меншин, Blok Natsional'nykh Menshyn; German: Block der Nationalen Minderheiten) was a political party in the Second Polish Republic, representing a coalition of various ethnic minorities in Poland, primarily Ukrainians, Belarusians, Jews and Germans.

== Overview ==
The Bloc was co-founded by Yitzhak Gruenbaum, a Polish-Jewish politician. It was formed on 17 August 1922 at a conference in Warsaw. Its united electoral committee consisted of three representatives each from Belarusians, Jews, Germans and Ukrainians (except for natives of Eastern Galicia who boycotted the elections).

BMN took part in the 1922 Polish legislative election, 1928 Polish legislative election and 1930 Polish legislative election, doing very well in the 1922 elections (19.5% and the second largest party) and 1928 elections (14% and the third largest party). In 1922 the bloc received the most votes in Volhynia, Polesia, and Chelm lands. On its party list there were elected 66 sejm representatives and 22 senators. In 1928 the bloc consisted of the Ukrainian National Democratic Alliance (UNDO), Ukrainian Peasant Union, Zionist organizations "Mizrahi" and "Hitachdut" (Unity) and few Belarusian and German groups. During the 1928 elections, the bloc earned 55 mandates to the Sejm and 21 to the Senate.

In the 1930 elections (which were considered not free), it fared poorly (3% and the ninth largest party). In the political shakedown following the 1930 elections, the Bloc was dissolved.

In the Second Polish Republic, ethnic minorities constituted 1/3 of total population.

== Notable members ==
=== Belarusians ===
- Branisłaŭ Taraškievič
- Jan Stankievič
- Adam Stankievič

=== Germans ===
- Heinrich Greitzer
- Adolf Rause
- Karl Wilhelm Lutticher

=== Jews ===
- Yitzhak Gruenbaum
- Jakub Wygodzki
- Noach Pryłucki
- Apolinary Hartglas
- Jakub Lejb Mincberg

=== Ukrainians ===
- Volodomyr Turchyniv
- Oleksii Sorydychiv
- Oleksander Syntyvich
