= National Workers' Party =

National Workers' Party Narodowa Partia Robotnicza
- Leader: Adam Chądzyński; Karol Popiel
- Founded: 23 May 1920
- Dissolved: 9 October 1937
- Merger of: National Party of Workers; National Workers' Union
- Merged into: Labor Party
- Headquarters: Warsaw, Poland
- Newspaper: Sprawa Robotnicza; Głos Robotnika
- Youth wing: Związek Młodzieży Pracującej „Jedność”
- Ideology: Solidarism; Syndicalism; Cooperativism; Factions: Left-wing nationalism Christian left
- Political position: Centre-left to left-wing
- Politics of Poland; Political parties; Elections; Electoral postcard of the NPR

The National Workers' Party (Polish: Narodowa Partia Robotnicza, NPR) was a left-wing, solidarist political party in Poland.

== History ==
The NPR was established in Warsaw on 23 May 1920 by a merger of the National Workers' Union and the National Party of Workers. Strongest in Greater Poland, Pomerania, Łódź and Silesia, it had around 150,000 members by the following year. It received around 5% of the vote in the 1922 elections, winning 18 seats in the Sejm and three in the Senate.

In 1926 the party split into two factions; one retained the NPR name, whilst the other became known as NPR-Left. The NPR-Left supported Józef Piłsudski's Sanation regime, whilst the NPR, which had been reduced to around 80,000 members, opposed it. The 1928 elections saw the NPR's vote share fall to 2%. As a result, it was reduced to 11 seats in the Sejm and two in the Senate.

In 1930, the NPR joined the Centrolew alliance, which contested the 1930 elections. The alliance won 79 seats, of which the NPR took eight. It later became part of the Front Morges, and by 1934 only had around 20,000 members. The party boycotted the 1935 elections; in 1937, it merged with the Polish Christian Democratic Party to form the Labor Party.

== Ideology ==
The party's platform in 1921 called for social solidarity and a strong parliamentary democracy, and supported autonomy for national minorities except Jews.

== Election results ==
=== Sejm ===
| Year | Votes | % | Seats | +/– |
|---|---|---|---|---|
| 1922 | 473,676 | 5.41 (#6) | 18 / 444 | – |
| 1928 | 228,119 | 1.99 (#10) | 11 / 444 | ▼7 |
| 1930 | Part of Centrolew | | 8 / 444 | ▼3 |
| 1935 | Boycotted | | | |
| 1938 | Boycotted | | | |
