= Polish Centre =

Polish Centre Polskie Centrum
- Merger of: National People's Union; Catholic People's Party
- Political position: Centre

The Polish Centre (Polish: Polskie Centrum, PC) was a political alliance in Poland.

== History ==
The PC was an alliance of National People's Union, the Catholic People's Party and Polski Związek Kresowy. It received around 3% of the vote in the 1922 elections, winning six seats in the Sejm. The right-wing, under the Christian Union of National Unity, accused it of attempting to lure away their voters.
