= Polish People's Union =

Polish People's Union Polskie Zjednoczenie Ludowe (Polish)
- Leader: Józef Ostachowski; Wacław Bliziński
- Founded: 1917
- Dissolved: August 1919
- Succeeded by: National People's Union; Polish People's Party "Wyzwolenie"
- Ideology: Agrarianism

The Polish People's Union (Polish: Polskie Zjednoczenie Ludowe, PZL) was a political party in Poland.

== History ==
The party was established in Congress Poland in 1917 as the "United Party", but was renamed PZL in 1918 after several members defected to the Polish People's Party "Piast". The party contested the January 1919 elections to elect the first Sejm of the Second Polish Republic. It received 3.8% of the vote, winning 35 seats.

However, it split in August 1919, with some members joining National People's Union and others joining Polish People's Party "Wyzwolenie".
