= Temporary Commission of Confederated Independence Parties =

The Temporary Coordinating Commission of Confederated Independence Parties (Polish: Komisja Tymczasowa Skonfederowanych Stronnictw Niepodległościowych, KTSSN) formed on 10 November 1912 in the Austrian Partition on the eve of World War I. It was an alliance of Polish political parties from Galicia in Austro-Hungary and their paramilitary wings existing in the form of legal Riflemen's Associations. Created in Vienna, KTSSN was later renamed as Komisja Skonfederowanych Stronnictw Niepodległościowych (KSSN, or the Commission of Confederated Independence Parties).

On 1 December 1912 KTSSN chose Józef Piłsudski to head its military arm, based on Riflemen's Association ("Strzelec"). Its goal was to coordinate the pro-Polish independence activities and support Austro-Hungary in the expected war. In case of the war its aim was to create a unified government for the territories liberated from the Russian partition of Poland.

It was created by the following parties: Polish Socialist Party, Polish Social Democratic Party of Galicia, Związek Patriotów, Związek Chłopski, Narodowy Związek Chłopski, Polish People's Party (after 1913 PSL Lewica), National Workers' Union (until May 1914), Związek Niepodległości (from May 1914 known as Organizacja Niepodległościowa Inteligencji).

Its main activists were: Józef Piłsudski, Ignacy Daszyński, Witold Jodko-Narkiewicz, Władysław Sikorski, Walery Sławek, Hipolit Śliwiński, and Leon Wasilewski. Commeettee's ties with the Austrian government and Anti-Russian policies were unpopular. In May 1914 KSSN some of the parties left KSSN; Riflemen's Association "Strzelec" also withdrew its support. On 16 August 1914 KSSN was replaced by the interim government of the re-emerging sovereign Poland, the Supreme National Committee (Naczelny Komitet Narodowy).
