= Polish People's Party "Left" =

The Polish People's Party "Left" (Polish: Polskie Stronnictwo Ludowe "Lewica", PSL Lewica) was a political party in Poland.

== History ==
The party was established by Jan Stapiński on 5 April 1914 as a breakaway from the Polish People's Party. In the January 1919 elections to elect the first Sejm of the Second Polish Republic it received 3.5% of the vote, winning 12 seats. However, the 1922 elections saw it reduced to two seats in the Sejm and fail to win a seat in the Senate.

On 11 May 1924 it merged with a breakaway faction of the Polish People's Party "Piast" to form the Agrarian Union. The new party merged with a faction of the Polish People's Party "Wyzwolenie" and People's Unity to form Stronnictwo Chłopskie in 1926.
