= National Workers' Union (Poland) =

Polish political party

The National Workers' Union (Polish: Narodowy Związek Robotniczy, NZR) was a political party in Poland.

== History ==
The NZR was established in June 1905 in Congress Poland by National Democracy (ND) in order to increase its support amongst the working class. However, following the Revolution of 1905, it broke away from ND, which had adopted a more pro-Russian approach. By 1906 the party had 15,961 members. It subsequently left the National League and joined the Temporary Commission of Confederated Independence Parties in 1912 after adopting a more pro-Austrian position.

The party ran in the January 1919 elections to elect the first Sejm of the Second Polish Republic, and although it only received 1.2% of the vote, it won 32 seats. On 23 May 1920 the party merged with the National Party of Workers to form the National Workers' Party.
