= 1922 Polish parliamentary election =

- 5 November 1922 (Sejm); 12 November 1922 (Senat)

All 444 seats in the Sejm
- Turnout: 67.9%
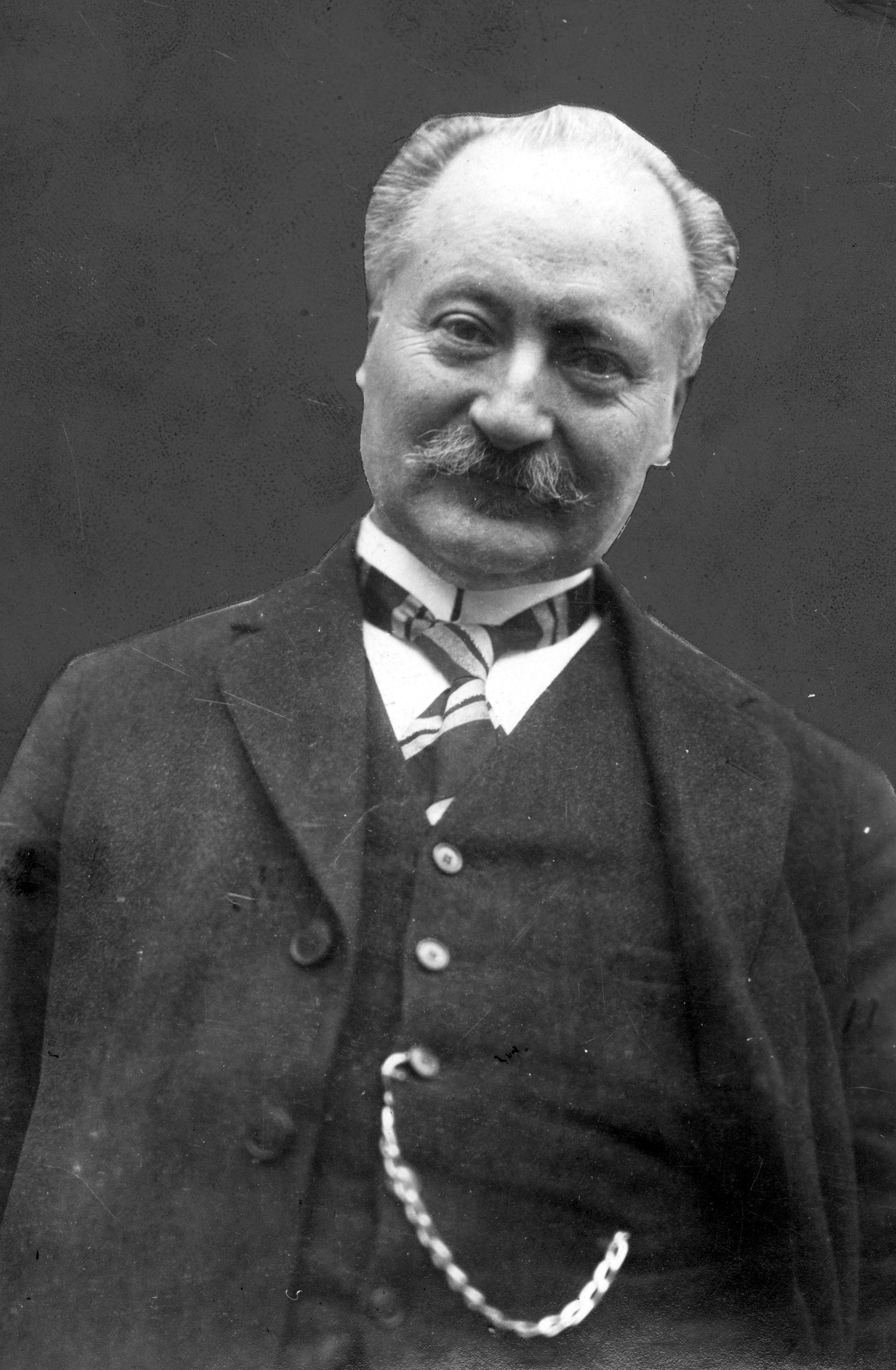

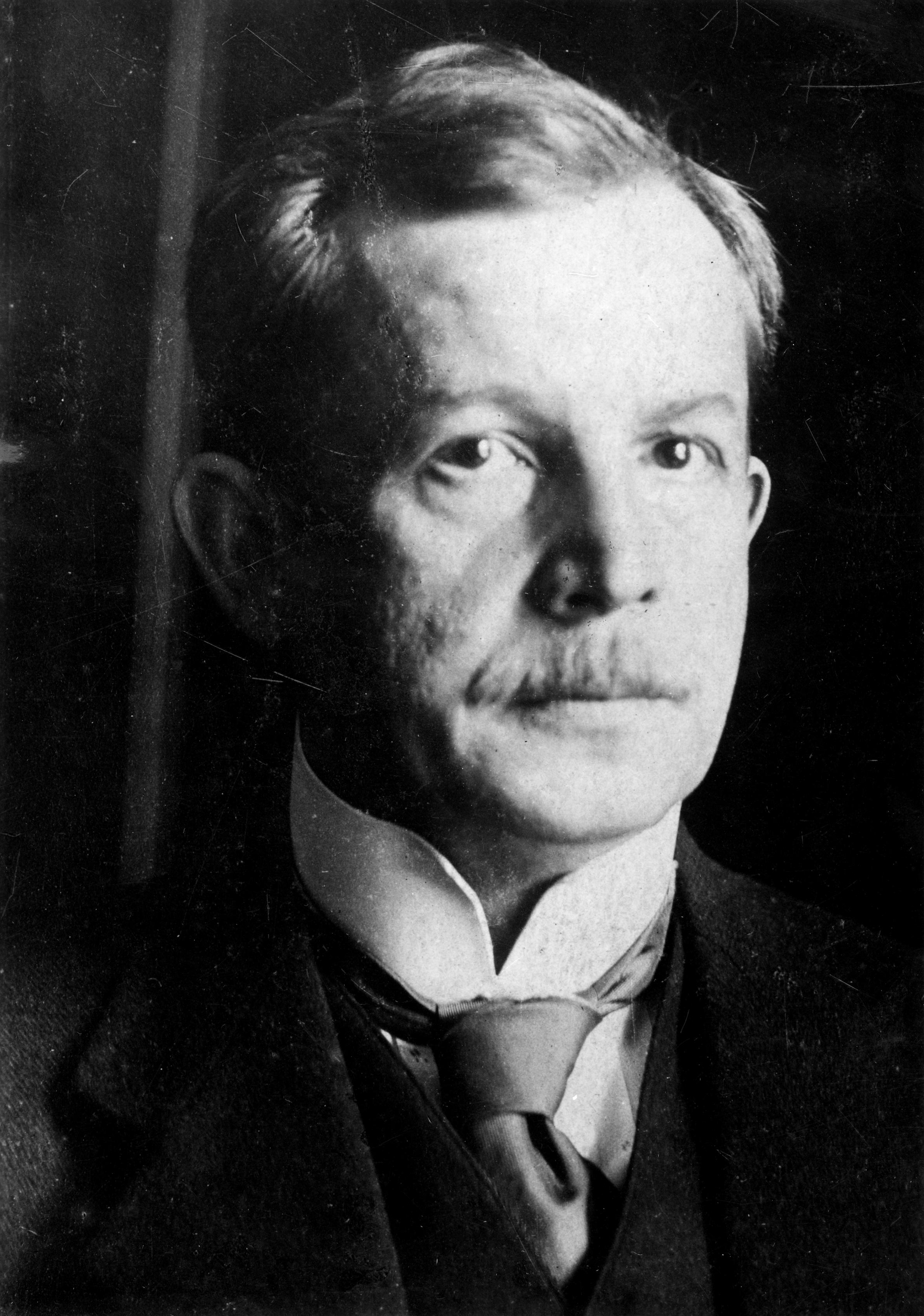

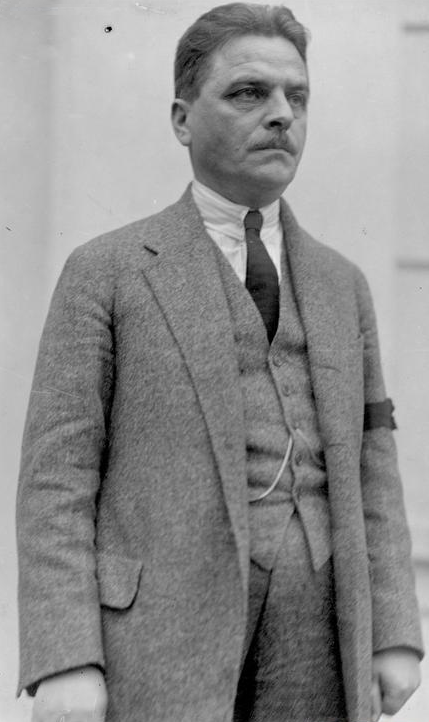

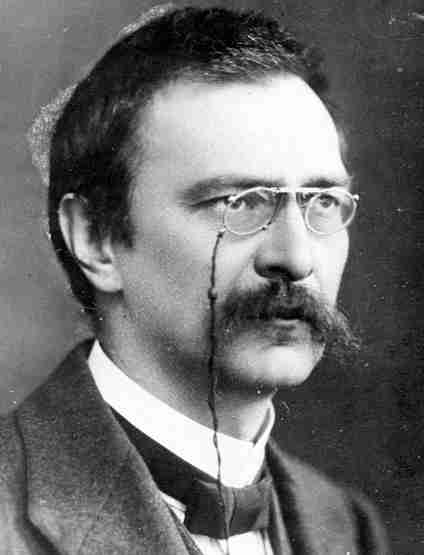

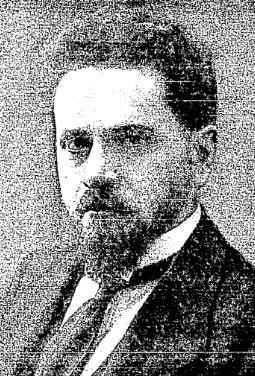

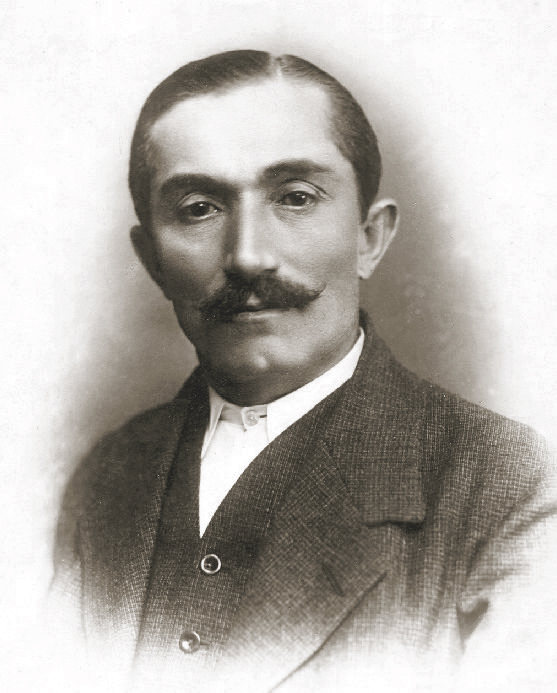

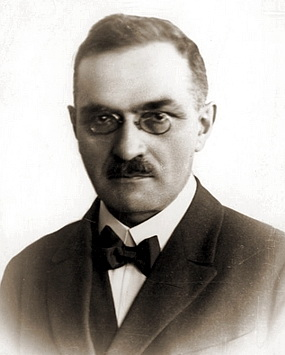

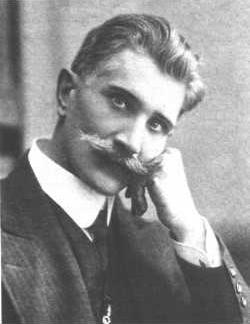

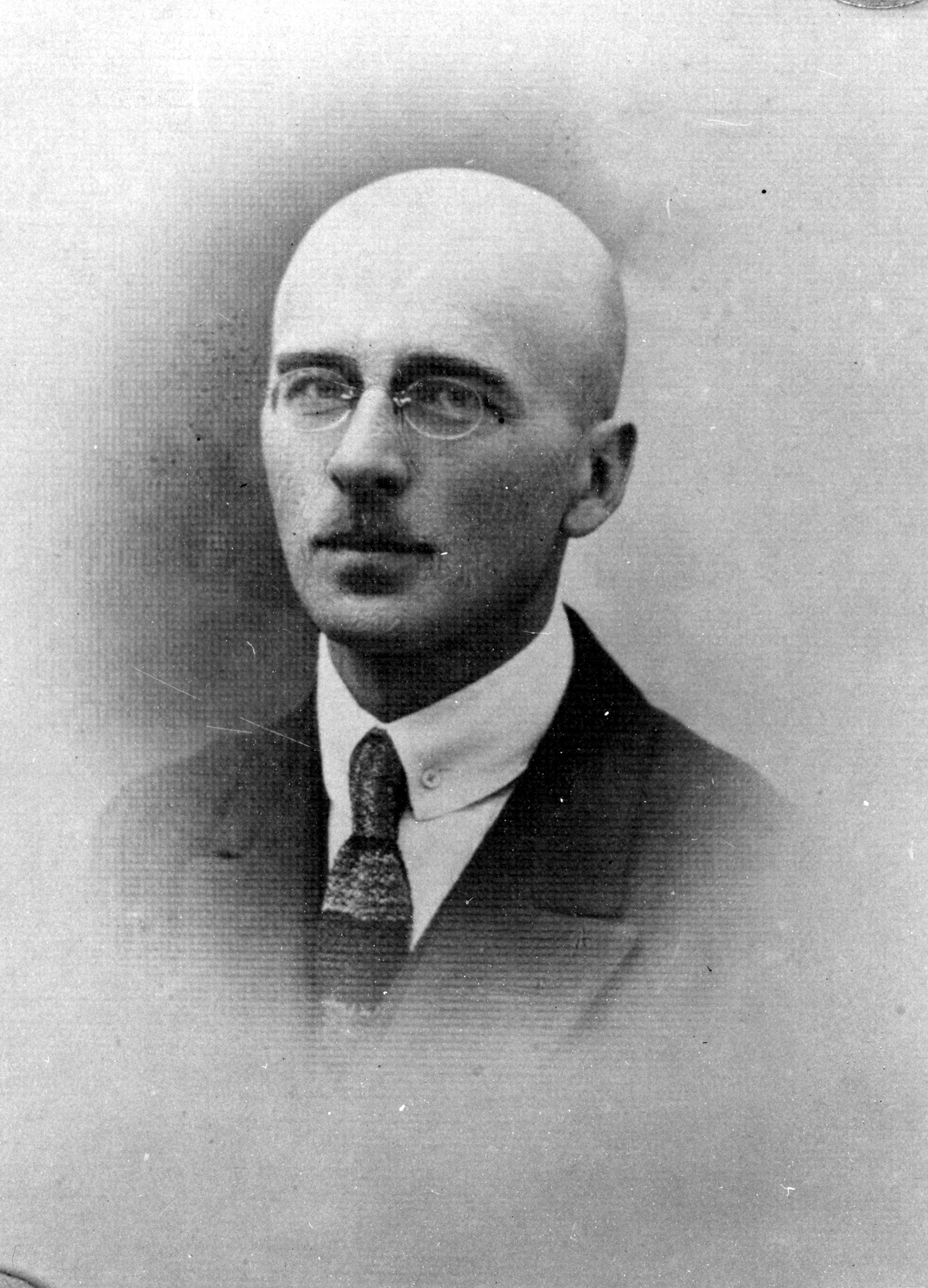
	Majority party	Minority party	Third party
Leader	Stanisław Głąbiński; Wojciech Korfanty; Edward Dubanowicz; Stanisław Grabski	Yitzhak Gruenbaum	Wincenty Witos
Party	ChZJN	BMN	PSL "Piast"
Leader since	November 1920	1922	1 December 1918
Last election	140	–	46
Seats won	163	66	70
Seat change	▲23	New	▲24
Popular vote	2,551,582	1,398,250	1,153,397
Percentage	29.1%	16.0%	13.2%
	Fourth party	Fifth party	Sixth party
Leader	Stanisław Thugutt	Ignacy Daszyński	Jan Stanisław Jankowski
Party	PSL "Wyzwolenie"	PPS	NPR
Leader since	1921	1921	1920
Last election	59	35	32
Seats won	49	41	18
Seat change	▼10	▲6	▼14
Popular vote	963,385	906,537	473,676
Percentage	11.0%	10.3%	5.4%
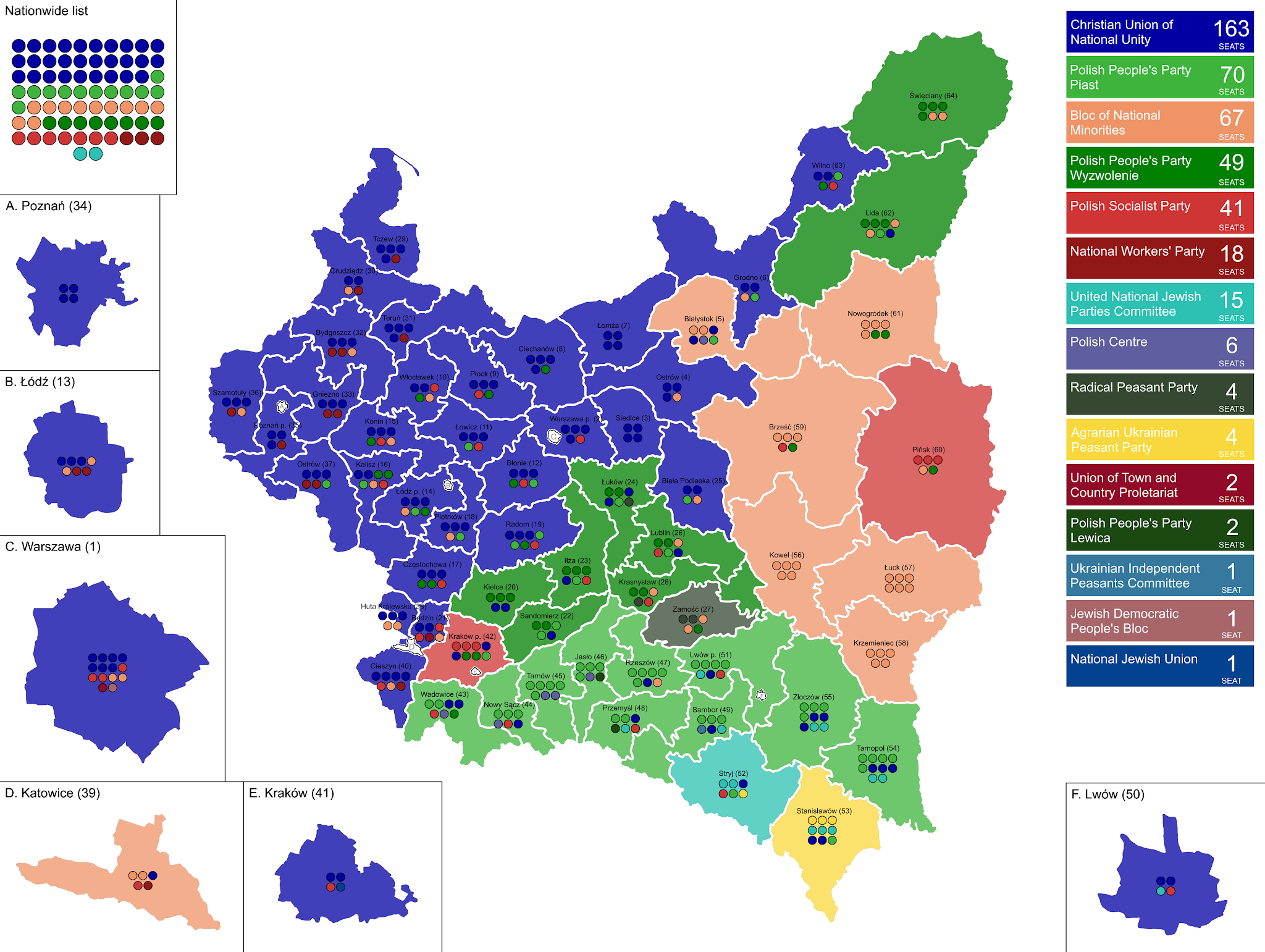
- Results by constituency
Prime Minister before election
Julian Nowak
Party of the National Right
Elected Prime Minister
Władysław Sikorski
Independent

Parliamentary elections were held in Poland on 5 November 1922, with Senate elections held a week later on 12 November. The elections were governed by the March Constitution of Poland, and saw the Christian Union of National Unity coalition emerge as the largest bloc in the Sejm with 163 of the 444 seats.

The resulting coalitions were unstable, and the situation - difficult from the start, with assassination of Polish president Gabriel Narutowicz in December shortly after the elections - culminated in 1926 with the May Coup.

== Results ==
=== Sejm ===
Party	Votes	%	Seats	+/–
Christian Union of National Unity	2,528,256	28.81	163	+23
Bloc of National Minorities	1,397,538	15.93	66	New
Polish People's Party "Piast"	1,132,962	12.91	70	+24
Polish People's Party "Wyzwolenie"	959,022	10.93	49	–10
Polish Socialist Party	894,103	10.19	41	+6
National Workers' Party	472,737	5.39	18	–14
Polish Centre	255,170	2.91	6	–
Union of Jewish National Parties in Lesser Poland	168,593	1.92	15	+7
Radical Peasant Party	127,006	1.45	4	New
Communist Party of Poland	121,571	1.39	2	–
Jewish National Union	86,782	0.99	2	–
Rural Ukrainian Club (Chliborobi)	81,039	0.92	5	–
General Jewish Labour Bund in Poland	80,735	0.92	0	–
Polish People's Party "Left"	60,338	0.69	2	–10
Folkspartei	50,587	0.58	1	–
Państwowe Zjednoczenie na Kresach	48,442	0.55	0	–
People's Council	46,555	0.53	0	–
National-State Union	38,159	0.43	0	–
Urban Centre	30,470	0.35	0	–
Jewish Labor Committee	15,242	0.17	0	–
Invalids and Demobilised Soldiers	11,833	0.13	0	–
Party of Independent Socialists	6,353	0.07	0	–
Communist Party of Upper Silesia	5,393	0.06	0	–
Poale Zion	3,347	0.04	0	–
Others	152,455	1.74	0	–
Total	8,774,688	100.00	444	+50
Valid votes	8,774,688	99.35		
Invalid/blank votes	57,807	0.65		
Total votes	8,832,495	100.00		
Registered voters/turnout	13,009,887	67.89		
Source: Sejm i Senat 1922-1927 p486–487, p477

=== Senate ===
Party	Votes	%	Seats
Christian Union of National Unity	2,173,756	38.70	48
Bloc of National Minorities	977,075	17.40	23
Polish People's Party "Piast"	729,622	12.99	17
Polish People's Party "Wyzwolenie"	529,675	9.43	8
Polish Socialist Party	468,147	8.34	7
National Workers' Party	291,779	5.20	3
Jewish Group	179,626	3.20	4
Radical Peasant Party	56,339	1.00	0
Państwowe Zjednoczenie na Kresach	55,953	1.00	1
Polish Centre	55,805	0.99	0
Communist Party of Poland	51,094	0.91	0
Polish People's Party "Left"	25,362	0.45	0
Union of People's Councils	10,096	0.18	0
Urban Centre	3,111	0.06	0
National-State Union	2,338	0.04	0
Others	6,713	0.12	0
Total	5,616,491	100.00	111
Valid votes	5,616,491	99.35	
Invalid/blank votes	36,838	0.65	
Total votes	5,653,329	100.00	
Registered voters/turnout	9,085,690	62.22	
Source: Nohlen & Stöver

== Ethnoreligious voting analysis ==
According to Kopstein and Wittenberg, 39% of the majority Catholic population voted for right-wing parties, 29% for non-revolutionary left-wing parties and 25% for centrist parties. The other ethnoreligious groups, including Uniates, Jews and Orthodox Christians voted largely for parties representing minority groups.

Some regional differences were observed; in western Poland, 9% of the Catholic vote went to minority interest parties, which has been attributed in part to German Catholic voting, but in the east, only 1% did. Ethnic Polish support for the right wing was stronger in the east of the country, where 40% voted for right-wing parties, as opposed to the south where 16% did. No detectable regional variation existed among Jews. The lack of support for the center and right among the major minorities (Jews, Ukrainians and Belarusians) was attributed to ethnic polarisation that was exacerbated by discrimination and chauvinism from Polish officials. Despite the success of minority parties, parties describing themselves as "Polish" refused to form a government with minority parties, and there was not one non-ethnic Polish cabinet member in the interwar period, though interethnic cooperation could still be seen in Ukrainian and Belarusian support for the Sikorski government.

Estimates of voting patterns by ethnoreligious groups
Religion	Communists	Nonrevolutionary left	Minority interest parties	Center	Right-wing	Overall share (1921 census)
Catholic	2%	29%	4%	25%	39%	64%
Uniate	3%	2%	77%	1%	5%	12%
Orthodox Christian	8%	37%	66%	1%	1%	10%
Jewish	4%	18%	65%	2%	4%	11%
Overall share (1921 census)	2%	16%	24%	25%	34%	
