= 1919 Polish parliamentary election =

- 26 January 1919
- All 394 seats in Legislative Sejm; 198 seats needed for a majority
Party	Leader	Vote %	Seats
ZLN	Wojciech Korfanty	28.96	140
PSL "Wyzwolenie"	Błażej Stolarski	15.05	59
ŻRN	Izaak Grünbaum	10.80	11
PPS	Ignacy Daszyński	9.23	35
PSL "Piast"	Wincenty Witos	4.17	46
PZL	Józef Ostachowski	3.80	35
PSL "Lewica"	Jan Stapiński	3.54	12
SKL	Leon Wałęga	1.83	18
German lists	−	1.73	2
NZR	Stanisław Nowicki	1.21	32
Independents	−	15.47	4
This lists parties that won seats. See the complete results below.
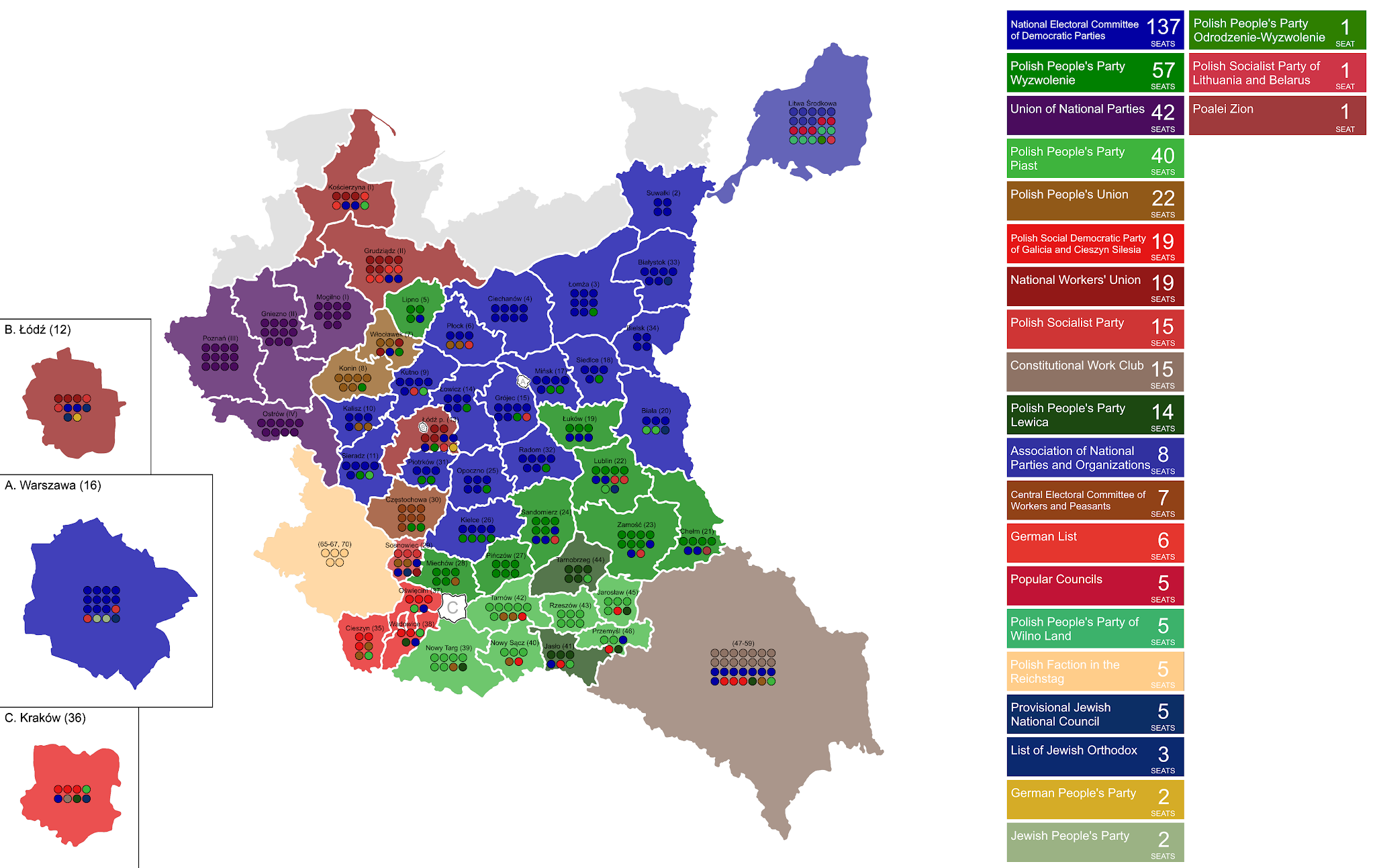
Results by constituency
President of Ministers before	President of Ministers after
Ignacy Jan Paderewski; Independent	Ignacy Jan Paderewski; Independent

Parliamentary elections were held in Poland on 26 January 1919, electing the first Sejm of the Second Polish Republic. The elections, based on universal suffrage and proportional representation, was the first free election in the country's history. It produced a parliament balanced between the right, left and centre, although the elections were boycotted by the Polish communists and the Jewish Bund. In the territories where the election took place, voter turnout was from 70% to 90%. Right-wing parties won 50% of votes, left-wing parties around 30%, and Jewish organisations more than 10%.

== Background ==
In 1919, the borders of the newly restored Polish state were not yet established. As a result, the government of Poland led by Jozef Pilsudski had problems creating the electoral districts. Upon a decree, signed by Pilsudski on 28 November 1918, Poland was divided into several districts, some of whom were not even part of the country. The list of these districts presents a declaration of Polish territorial claims rather than real situation of late 1918. It covers the whole territory of the Kingdom of Poland (1916–1918), formerly Russian Belostok Oblast, as well as whole former Austrian province of Galicia, even though its eastern part was area of a conflict between Poles and Ukrainians (see Polish–Ukrainian War).

The situation was even more complicated in the West, in territories which had belonged to the German Empire. Polish legislators created there several electoral districts, even in lands that never became part of the Second Polish Republic. Thus, apart from districts of Poznań, Toruń, Kartuzy, Katowice, and Gostyń, the government stipulated creation of districts in such locations, as Bytom (Beuthen), Nysa, Złotów (Flatow), Gdańsk (Danzig), and Olsztyn (Allenstein). The 1919 election was not organised in these areas, as they remained part of Germany until 1945.

Furthermore, Polish legislators wanted the election to be organised in whole Cieszyn Silesia (see also Trans-Olza). Therefore, districts were created there in Cieszyn and Frýdek-Místek. Also, the Nowy Targ district covered several communes of Orawa, and Spisz, with such towns, as Kežmarok, Stará Ľubovňa, and Spišská Nová Ves (these locations had been part of Poland until the late 18th century).

== Results ==
Party	Votes	%	Seats
Popular National Union	1,616,157	28.96	140
Polish People's Party "Wyzwolenie"	839,914	15.05	59
Jewish National Council	602,927	10.80	11
Polish Socialist Party	515,062	9.23	35
Peasants' Lists	234,399	4.20	0
Polish People's Party "Piast"	232,983	4.17	46
Polish People's Union	212,097	3.80	35
Polish People's Party "Left"	197,838	3.54	12
Catholic People's Party	102,292	1.83	18
German National Minority	96,677	1.73	2
National Workers' Union	67,285	1.21	32
Local lists and independents	863,349	15.47	4
Total	5,580,980	100.00	394
Source: Nohlen & Stöver

== Aftermath ==
The resulting parliament came to be known as the Legislative Sejm (Sejm Ustawodawczy). Among the first tasks of the Sejm was creation of the constitution, and the Small Constitution of 1919 was ratified ten days after the first session, on 20 February 1919. In 1921 parliament ratified the more comprehensive but also more controversial—supported by the Right, opposed by the Left—March Constitution of Poland.
