= Green Cadres =

Austro-Hungarian deserters and outlaws

- Leader: No centralised leadership
- Dates active: 1914–1919
- Active regions: Various parts of Austria-Hungary
- Wars: World War I

The Green Cadres, (Note: Croatian: Zeleni kadar, Zeleni kader; Czech: Zelené kádry; German: Grüner Kader) sometimes referred to as Green Brigades or Green Guards, were outlaw paramilitary groups that existed in Austria-Hungary from 1914 to 1918 and its successor states from 1918 to 1919. They were present in nearly all areas of Austria-Hungary, but particularly large numbers were found in Croatia-Slavonia, Bosnia, Western Slovakia, Moravia, and Galicia.

The Green Cadres were originally groups of deserters from the Austro-Hungarian Army during the First World War which were later joined by peasants discontented with wartime requisitioning, taxation, and poverty. A substantial number of desertions occurred as early as 1914 and their numbers peaking in the summer of 1918 as Austria-Hungary collapsed. The Green Cadres had no centralised structure, and relied on peasants and banditry for food and shelter. The dissolution of Austria-Hungary in October 1918 saw a peak in violent outbreaks associated with the Green Cadres, particularly in Croatia-Slavonia, Slovakia and Galicia.

The Green Cadres were often nationalistic and initially portrayed as desirable partners to the national movements working to achieve independence of Slavic peoples from Austria-Hungary. The new authorities of independent Czechoslovakia and the State of Slovenes, Croats and Serbs found the Green Cadres problematic because of lack of discipline and suspected Bolshevik influence. The State of Slovenes, Croats and Serbs, faced with large-scale unrest in the countryside had to resort to inviting the Royal Serbian Army to restore order. The move significantly limited options available to the newly declared state, and gave the Kingdom of Serbia considerable advantage during the process of creating Yugoslavia. In Galicia, the short-lived Republic of Tarnobrzeg was established, with the help of the Green Cadres, until intervention by the Polish Army. From October to November 1918, violence was primarily directed against government officials and administration, landowners, and merchants – especially the Jews. The Green Cadres were largely dissolved by 1919.

== Background ==
Austria–Hungary
Kingdoms and countries of Austria–Hungary:
Cisleithania (Empire of Austria): 1. Bohemia, 2. Bukovina, 3. Carinthia, 4. Carniola, 5. Dalmatia, 6. Galicia, 7. Küstenland, 8. Lower Austria, 9. Moravia, 10. Salzburg, 11. Silesia, 12. Styria, 13. Tyrol, 14. Upper Austria, 15. Vorarlberg;
Transleithania (Kingdom of Hungary): 16. Hungary proper 17. Croatia-Slavonia; 18. Bosnia and Herzegovina (Austro-Hungarian condominium)

After Austria-Hungary invaded Serbia in 1914, the Great powers of Europe entered what became the First World War, driven by imperialistic rivalries. Austria-Hungary joined the Central Powers with Germany and the Ottoman Empire, which were opposed by the Triple Entente, which consisted of the United Kingdom supported by France and Russia. Germany — the more powerful partner in the Central Powers — saw an opportunity to expand its sphere of influence economically and expand into the Middle East, and used Austria-Hungary and the Ottoman Empire as an overland route towards Mesopotamia. The German–Ottoman alliance was also designed to divert Russian resources from Galicia, where Austro-Hungarian forces were battling the Russian Imperial Army.

Austria-Hungary suffered significant economic hardships due to the war — the country had no provisions for a long war and relied on Germany for supplies. Severe fuel shortages and food rationing led to demonstrations and strikes. These worsened issues related to ethnic tensions and the political structure of the Habsburg monarchy that had plagued Austria-Hungary since long before the war. Demands for political reforms, such as Austro-Slavism or Trialism, were replaced with demands for independence of Slavic peoples living in the Habsburg lands. Emperor Charles I proposed federalisation in an unsuccessful attempt to prevent the disintegration of the empire in October 1918. The Hungarian government considered this proposal a repudiation of the Austro-Hungarian Compromise of 1867 and declared the end of the dual monarchy. The political problems were reflected in the Austro-Hungarian military. The government feared upheaval inspired by the October Revolution and demands to end the war even without victory.

== Desertion ==
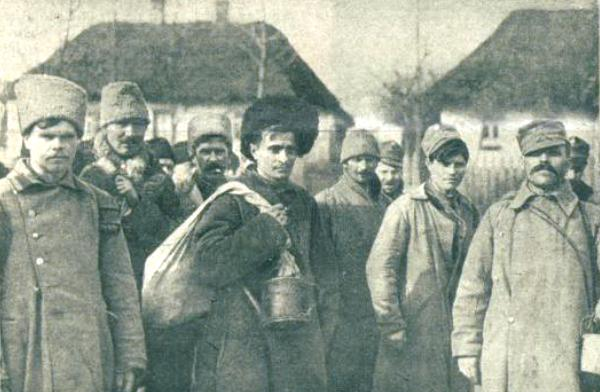
Austro-Hungarian prisoners of war returning home from Russia

The Austro-Hungarian Army saw increasing numbers of deserters during the war. Most of them were conscripts from rural areas who escaped from barracks, left hospitals while recovering from wounds or illnesses, or never reported back to their units after leave. Most lived at home and only fled to nearby forests to evade arrest when a patrol approached. They would often be warned of approaching gendarmes by the rural civilian population, which generally supported and fed the deserters. Some of the deserters helped as farmworkers. In the first year of the war, 6,689 were apprehended by the authorities in the Hungarian half of the monarchy, and 26,251 more the following year. In 1916, the number reached 38,866, increasing to 81,605 in 1917. In the first three months of 1918, another 46,611 were arrested. The Austro-Hungarian Army deployed seven infantry divisions to the interior of the country to hunt down deserters, resulting in hundreds of armed clashes.

In 1917, the deserters were first referred to as the Green Cadres by the authorities in Croatia-Slavonia – the crown land where Green Cadres were particularly numerous. In some instances, they were called the Green Brigades or the Green Guards. Western Slovakia and Galicia also saw large numbers. By September 1918, there were about 50,000 Green Cadres among the Croats, Serbs, and Bosniaks, with about 10,000 in Bosnia, and the rest in Croatia-Slavonia. Particular centres of Green Cadres activity were the Petrova Gora hills and the Fruška Gora mountains where 8,000 and 6,000 took refuge respectively. Other major centres were the Zrinska Gora, and Papuk mountains, as well as in Hrvatsko Zagorje near Varaždin, and at the estate of the Metropolitanate of Karlovci near the village of Dalj. There were about 10,000 Green Cadres in Galicia, 4,000 in western Slovakia, and 5,000 in Moravia (around Buchlov). A strong Green Cadres presence was also found in the Hungarian Bakony Mountains, Slovenian Trnovo Forest Plateau, Transylvania, as well as the Wechsel and Semmering Pass regions of Lower Austria. The Green Cadres kept weapons issued to them by the army – including some machine guns, explosives, and artillery.

The Green Cadres had no centralised leadership or formal command structure, although some groups in Croatia-Slavonia had appointed leaders, and enforced rudimentary martial law. By the summer of 1918, their numbers grew as disgruntled peasants joined the ranks. They chose to join the Green Cadres as the armed groups became synonymous with rural rebelliousness.

== Banditry ==
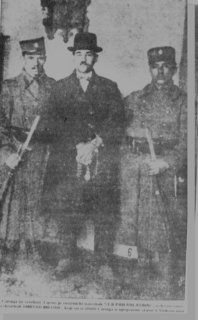
Jovo Stanisavljević Čaruga joined the Green Cadres before gaining notoriety as a highwayman in Croatia-Slavonia.

Banditry was pervasive in the Green Cadres. Many peasants engaged in it as a form of social protest by stealing from the rich to give to the poor – especially in the Carpathian Mountains (in Slovakia and Moravia) and in Croatia-Slavonia. The Green Cadres enjoyed the appeal of romantic liberty in oral folk culture. It associated them with the legend of Slovak highwayman Juraj Jánošík, Slovene Rokovnjači highwaymen who evaded Napoleonic Wars-era conscription in Carinthia, and the Austrian Trenck's Pandurs – a skirmisher unit raised in Slavonia and famous for pillaging in the First and Second Silesian Wars. Several contemporary Green Cadres gained notoriety for their actions – for example Alfonz Šarh in Slovenia, and Jovo Stanisavljević Čaruga in Croatia-Slavonia. The latter joined forces with Božo Matijević to establish a band of highwaymen. Čaruga gained a popular nickname, the "Slavonian Robin Hood" and was perceived as the sole champion of the common people. Čaruga was captured by authorities in 1923, convicted and sentenced to death. His execution was witnessed by about 3,000 people.

Austro-Hungarian authorities deemed the Green Cadres a major societal problem. In their view, it was particularly dangerous that the armed groups were significantly influenced by rumours spread by former prisoners of war returning from Russia after the October Revolution and the Brest-Litovsk treaty. By June 1918 half a million of them returned, and another 1.5 million were expected to arrive in short succession.

== Peasant revolt ==
In October and early November 1918, as Austria-Hungary disintegrated, violence involving the Green Cadres worsened – especially in Croatia-Slavonia, western Slovakia, and Galicia. The violence was especially targeted at (former) government officials, socio-economic elites, and Jews. Popular grievances, particularly peasant grievances, were based on ostensible injustices against impoverished peasants. They were aimed at restoring a perceived rightful order disrupted by the war and remedying associated injustices, such as profiteering by merchants and landowners enabled by corrupt officials. As such, the Green Cadres can be compared to earlier peasant revolts.

=== Croatia-Slavonia and Bosnia ===
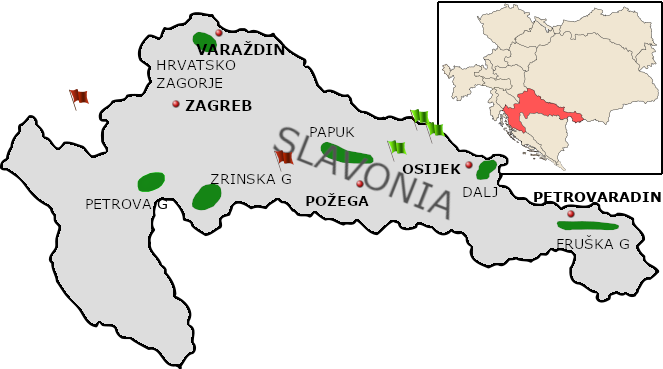
Areas of Green Cadres concentration in Croatia-Slavonia in 1918 (shaded green); locations of peasant (green flags) and soviet republics (red flags)

On 5–6 October, representatives of Austro-Hungarian Croat, Serb, and Slovene political parties organised the Zagreb-based National Council of Slovenes, Croats and Serbs, tasked with achieving independence from the empire. Within two weeks, the National Council proclaimed the State of Slovenes, Croats and Serbs encompassing the Slovene Lands, Croatia-Slavonia, Dalmatia, and Bosnia and Herzegovina. On 26 October, the National Council authorised the Yugoslav Committee, an interest group advocating the unification of Austro-Hungarian South Slavic lands largely corresponding to the newly proclaimed state and Serbia, to speak on behalf of the National Council regarding international relations. At the same time, the National Council president Anton Korošec left Zagreb for talks in Geneva with the Yugoslav Committee, Serbian government, and opposition representatives, to discuss the method of unification with Serbia.

The worst violence in Croatia-Slavonia took place between 24 October and 4 November 1918 – the week before and after declaration of independence of the State of Slovenes, Croats and Serbs. It was precipitated by a mutiny in Požega; the mutineers were joined by the Green Cadres on 24 October. Two days later, soldiers of a Dalmatian and a Czech regiment clashed in nearby Orahovica. Parts of the regiments mutinied and left after ransacking the barracks. Violence spread from Požega westwards to Nova Gradiška and Kutina; and eastwards from Orahovica to Našice to Osijek where elements of the 23rd Regiment and the 28th Regiment of the Royal Croatian Home Guard joined in the looting. The Green Cadres also took part in looting Našice and Osijek, albeit in a secondary role.

Pillaging and looting affected the entire regions of Slavonia and Hrvatsko Zagorje. The main targets were merchants – primarily Jews from Hungary or Austria – whose shops were looted and set on fire. The National Council hesitated to condemn the violence, reinforcing the sense of impunity. The National Council deployed the local National Guards militia to little effect, because the National Guards were largely drawn from the same peasants who were looting. Some gendarmerie barracks were abandoned to looters, while others were captured by the Green Cadres along with local officials as was done in Đakovo and Velika Gorica. In such circumstances, the National Council relied on the conscription of Serbian prisoners of war (captured by the Austro-Hungarian Army during the war) to combat looting, and sent a delegation to the Royal Serbian Army command on 5 November to send troops to Croatia-Slavonia to help suppress the unrest. The property of the nobility and other major landowners suffered heavy damage, and virtually all large estates (including those owned by the Roman Catholic and Serbian Orthodox Church) were plundered. While looting in Petrovaradin, Pakrac, Daruvar, and Županja was led by rebelling army units, and even though released Russian prisoners of war and prisoners released by mob from Zagreb prisons joined the violence, most of the pillaging and looting was done by peasants, and the (mostly peasant) Green Cadres.

Authorities were quick to assign part of the blame for the unrest on the communists and the Croatian People's Peasant Party (HPSS), and addressed genuine grievances by political repression. In the long run, the association of the HPSS with the popular discontent helped propel the party to become the most successful political party among the Croats in the interwar period. The peasants of Croatia-Slavonia initially understood republicanism simply as negation of the existing order, including the abolition of military conscription and taxes, and the October to November unrest set it as the ultimate political objective for them. Three short-lived peasant republics were established in Slavonia. There were also two quickly defeated republics based on the Soviet model – one in the Central Croatia and one in neighbouring Carniola. The HPSS subsequently adopted republicanism as its ideology.

In Bosnia and Herzegovina, the Green Cadres plundered provisioning depots in Varcar Vakuf, Glamoč, Jajce, and Travnik. Inter-ethnic violence flared up in Semberija and Eastern Herzegovina where Bosnian Serbs attacked Bosniak landowners killing them and burning their estates. Bosniak mobs moved from Cazin to neighbouring Banija and Kordun regions to attack Serb villagers. As the result of the violence, the National Council asked the Serbian Second Army commander Field Marshal Stepa Stepanović to maintain order in Bosnia and Herzegovina on 4 November.

=== Slovakia, Bohemia and Galicia ===
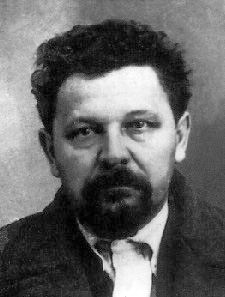
Tomasz Dąbal helped establish the Republic of Tarnobrzeg in Galicia.

In Western Slovakia, the Green Cadres looted the area of Trstín in the Trnava Region. Like in Croatia-Slavonia, the violence was primarily aimed against Jews and landowners, as well as officials. According to Jozef Ferančík, a prominent Green Cadres figure in the region, this was divine justice, falsely claiming that neither Jews nor landowners fought in the war, and only the Green Cadres knew how to mete out their punishment. Peasants looted estates and granaries distributing liquor and cereal among themselves. Soldiers rebelled in Trnava and, taking a cue from the Green Cadres, proclaimed freedom before plundering town shops. As in Croatia-Slavonia, in addition to the antisemitic aspect, there was an ethnic element to the violence: the landowners, mostly ethnic Hungarians or Germans, were targeted by Slavic peasants.

The Green Cadres had a substantial presence in Bohemia during the war, but there, they remained relatively peaceful, in the immediate aftermath of the dissolution of Austria-Hungary. Nonetheless, there were instances of individual acts of retribution against (former) officials and other authority figures. In Galicia, the Green Cadres were active in the area ranging from Rzeszów and Przemyśl to the Carpathians. The violence followed the same pattern and included the Lwów pogrom. However, violence against Galician landowners lacked the intra-ethnic aspect, as both the landowners and the peasants tended to be Poles. On 6 November, the Republic of Tarnobrzeg was established in Galicia by socialist activists Tomasz Dąbal and Eugeniusz Okoń with support of the Green Cadres.

== National emancipation ==
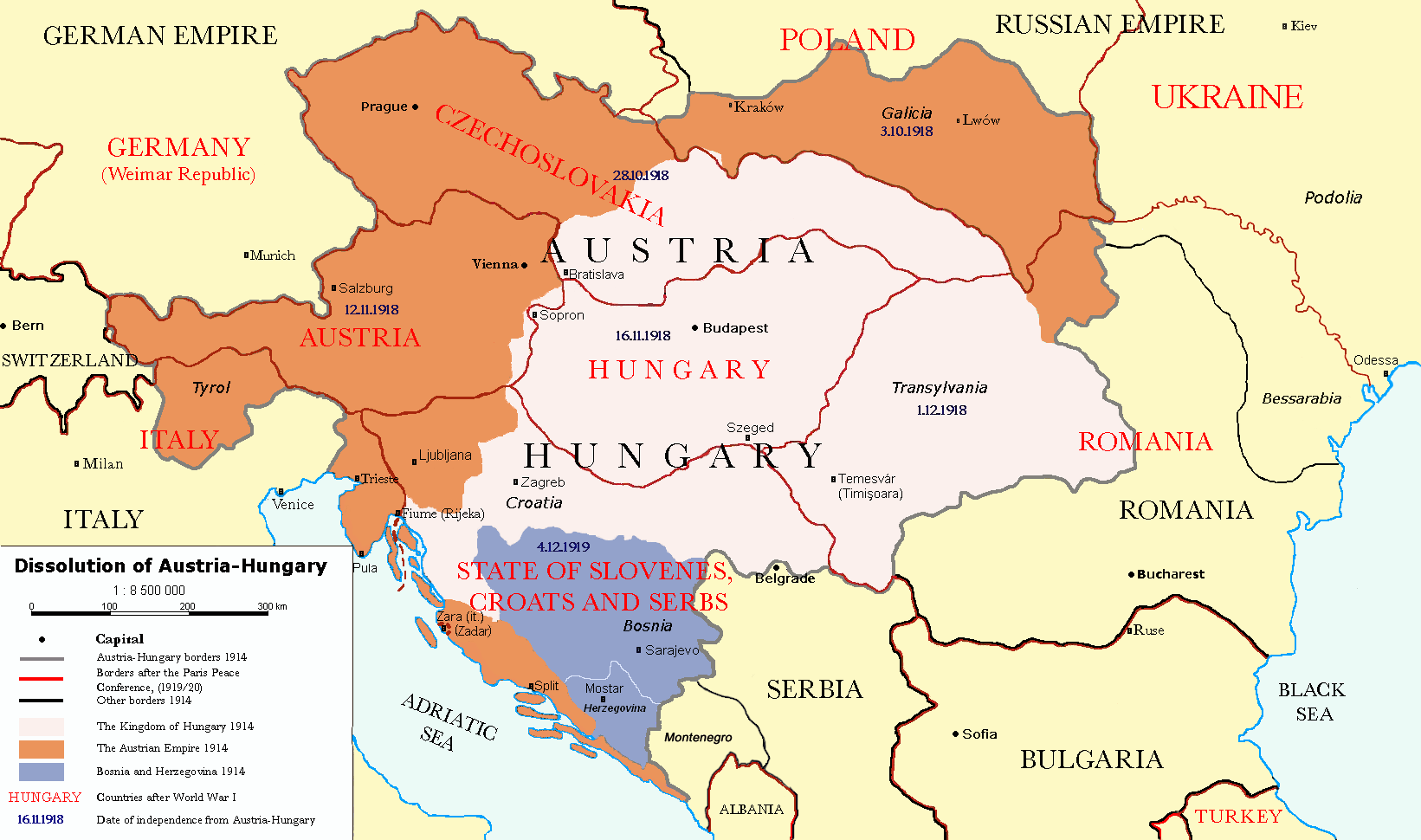
Changes of borders after the Treaty of Trianon and Saint Germain Border of Austria-Hungary in 1914 Borders in 1914 Borders in 1920 Empire of Austria in 1914 Kingdom of Hungary in 1914 Bosnia and Herzegovina in 1914

In the final weeks of the war, the national movements and groups supporting independence of various Slavic peoples living in Austria-Hungary, including the Czechoslovak National Council and the Yugoslav Committee, unsuccessfully tried to enlist the Green Cadres in their nation-building projects. The Green Cadres' views often differed from those held by the national elites trying to attract their support. The existence of the Green Cadres and their purported strength was used in wartime airborne leaflet propaganda with the aim of demoralising the Austro-Hungarian troops.

As the new states were established, the Green Cadres became a potential threat. On 18 October, a special court-martial was established in Croatia-Slavonia for the Green Cadres – without much success. On 23 October 1918, days before the establishment of the State of Slovenes, Croats and Serbs, the Green Cadres were cheered on at demonstrations held in Zagreb. Six days later, when the Croatian Sabor declared secession from Austria-Hungary, the delegates drew up a formal policy towards the Green Cadres. The president of the assembly Bogdan Medaković attacked them as thieves, arsonists, killers, and enemies of the people, while the HPSS leader Stjepan Radić unsuccessfully advocated a conciliatory approach, calling on the Green Cadres to join the new national armed forces. In newly established Czechoslovakia, the Green Cadres were called, in a newspaper announcement, to serve the national army by reporting to appropriate headquarters. Such appeals were generally disregarded. The National Council of the State of Slovenes, Croats and Serbs declared a general amnesty for those convicted of treason, crimes against public order, or joining the Green Cadres on 30 October. On 5 November, it introduced martial law to suppress acts of rebellion, murder, arson, and public violence. Efforts were made in the newly formed Kingdom of Serbs, Croats and Slovenes to address a concern shared by the Green Cadres through a land reform of 1919, but those reforms, and those in Czechoslovakia, were half-hearted, or at least perceived as such. Real or perceived influence of Bolshevism on the Green Cadres was a significant obstacle to greater inclusion of its members in the new national armed forces.

In southeast Moravia, many Green Cadres members joined the Slovak Brigade formed in Hodonín. The regional character of the brigade and its Green Cadres history were frowned upon by the Czechoslovak Army. The brigade lacked discipline and was dissolved in 1919. In Galicia, the Republic of Tarnobrzeg was suppressed by the Polish Army in January 1919. After 1918, the Green Cadres gradually dispersed.

== Impact and legacy ==
=== Interwar period ===
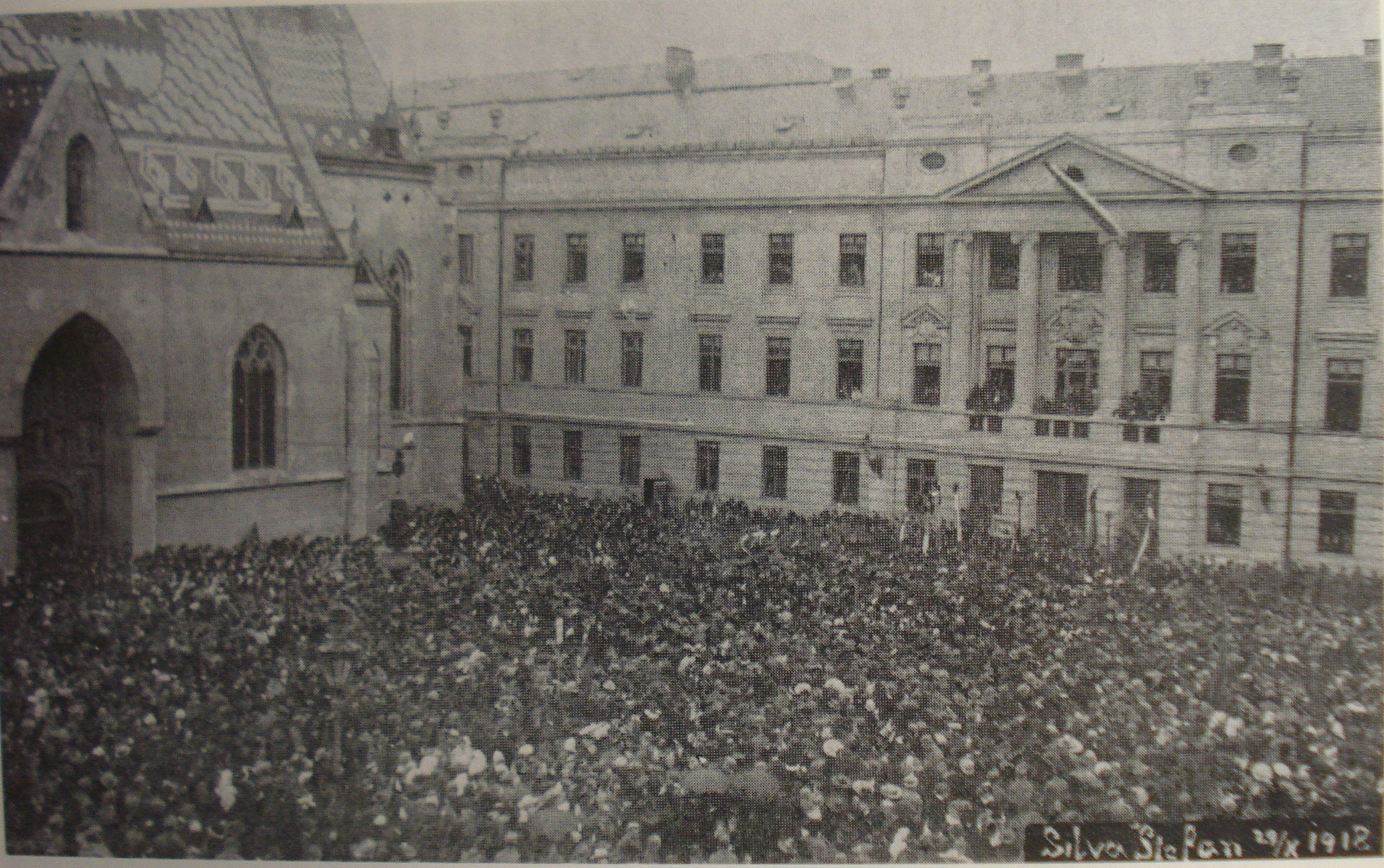
Proclamation of the State of Slovenes, Croats and Serbs in front of the Sabor in Zagreb

The October–November 1918 unrest in Croatia-Slavonia as well as in Bosnia and Herzegovina limited the options available to the National Council in Zagreb, and destined the State of Slovenes, Croats and Serbs to failure. The National Council could not pacify the country on its own and saw the pillaging as likely causing further food shortages. Since local militias nominally under the National Council command could not or would not perform the task, there was no other option available other than to invite the Royal Serbian Army to intervene. This gave Serbia decisive advantage in the process of unification of the South Slavs and establishment of the Kingdom of Serbs, Croats and Slovenes.

The Green Cadres reappeared in 1919 and 1920 in the Kingdom of Serbs, Croats and Slovenes and in Czechoslovakia in response to disappointment in reforms introduced by the new countries and to land seizures. There was some Green Cadres activity in parallel to the 1920 Croatian Peasant Rebellion in Croatia-Slavonia and as a safe harbour for those avoiding conscription.

=== Second World War ===
At the time of the Second World War, the Green Cadres were used as the name of a number of resistance groups in homage to the original Green Cadres. In 1938, throughout the Sudeten crisis, there were pro-Nazi Bohemian Germans avoiding draft to the Czechoslovak Army, calling themselves Green Cadres. In 1942, one of the first groups of partisans in the Protectorate of Bohemia and Moravia, operating in the Hostýn-Vsetín Mountains, adopted the name Green Cadre. Carinthian Slovenes formed a Green Cadres partisan group in the Karawanks range, while Šarh reemerged as a resistance leader of the Yugoslav Partisans. In Bosnia and Herzegovina, the Green Cadres were established as a paramilitary organisation with changing wartime allegiances; its activities continued until the 1950 Cazin rebellion.

== Sources ==
- Banac, Ivo (1984). The National Question in Yugoslavia: Origins, History, Politics. Ithaca: Cornell University Press. ISBN 0-8014-1675-2.
- Banac, Ivo (1992). "'Emperor Karl Has Become a Comitadji': The Croatian Disturbances of Autumn 1918". The Slavonic and East European Review. 70 (2). London: Modern Humanities Research Association: 284–305. ISSN 0037-6795. JSTOR 4210927.
- Beneš, Jakub S. (2017). "The Green Cadres and the Collapse of Austria-Hungary in 1918". Past & Present. 236 (1). Oxford: Oxford University Press: 207–241. doi:10.1093/pastj/gtx028. ISSN 0031-2746.
- Bogdanović, Tomislav (2013). "Kategorije zelenog kadra 1918. godine i osvrt na njihovo djelovanje u Podravini i Prigorju" [Categories of Austro-Hungarian Army deserters in 1918 (so-called Green Cadres, as they hid in the woods) and their activities in Podravina and Prigorje]. Podravina: Časopis za multidisciplinarna istraživanja (in Croatian). 12 (23). Koprivnica: Sveučilište Sjever: 96–108. ISSN 1333-5286.
- Glenny, Misha (2012). The Balkans, 1804–2012: Nationalism, War and the Great Powers. Toronto: House of Anansi Press. ISBN 978-1-77089-273-6.
- Headlam, James Wycliffe (1911). "Austria-Hungary" . In Chisholm, Hugh (ed.). Encyclopædia Britannica. Vol. 3 (11th ed.). Cambridge University Press. pp. 2–39.
- Kosi, Jernej (2020). "Summer of 1919". The Hungarian Historical Review. 9 (1). Budapest: Institute of History, Research Centre for the Humanities, Hungarian Academy of Sciences: 51–68. ISSN 2063-8647. JSTOR 26984101.
- Matijević, Zlatko (2008). "Narodno vijeće Slovenaca, Hrvata i Srba u Zagrebu: Osnutak, djelovanje i nestanak (1918/1919)" [National Council of Slovenes, Croats and Serbs in Zagreb: Founding, Actions and Disappearance (1918/1919)]. Fontes: Izvori Za Hrvatsku Povijest (in Croatian). 14 (1). Zagreb: Croatian State Archives: 35–66. ISSN 1330-6804.
- Ramet, Sabrina P. (2006). The Three Yugoslavias: State-building and Legitimation, 1918–2005. Bloomington: Indiana University Press. ISBN 9780253346568.
- Sablić-Tomić, Helena (2004). "Dokumentarne biografije slavonskog Robina Hooda" [Documentary Biographies of the Slavonian Robin Hood]. Dani Hvarskoga kazališta: Građa i rasprave o hrvatskoj književnosti i kazalištu (in Croatian). 30 (1). Split: Croatian Academy of Sciences and Arts and Split Literary Circle: 167–175. ISSN 1849-0158.
- Štambuk-Škalić, Marina; Matijević, Zlatko, eds. (2008). "Narodno vijeće Slovenaca, Hrvata i Srba u Zagrebu 1918–1919. (izabrani dokumenti)" [National Council of Slovenes, Croats and Serbs in Zagreb 1918–1919 (Selected Documents)]. Fontes: Izvori Za Hrvatsku Povijest (in Croatian). 14 (1). Zagreb: Croatian State Archives: 71–596. ISSN 1330-6804.
- Tucker, Spencer C. (1998). The Great War, 1914-18. London: UCL Press. ISBN 1-85728-390-2.
