= Eleonora Ziemięcka =

Polish philosopher and publicist (1819–1869)

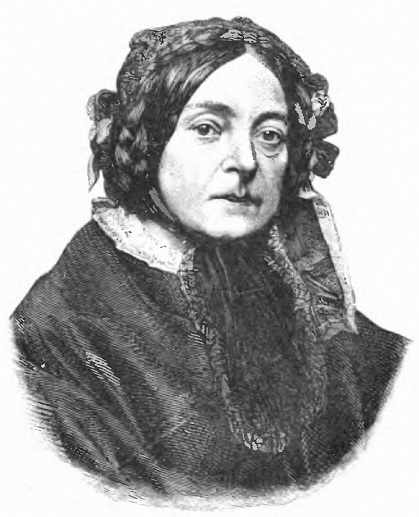
- Eleonora Ziemięcka around 1869
- Born: Eleonora Gagatkiewicz; 1819; Jasieniec
- Died: 23 September 1869 (aged 49–50); Warsaw
- Occupations: writer, philosopher, publicist
- Writing career
- Notable work: Thoughts on the Education of Women

Eleonora Ziemięcka (ne Gagatkiewicz) (born 1819 in Jasieniec in Mazovia, died September 23, 1869, in Warsaw) - was a Polish philosopher and publicist. She is often considered to be Poland's first female philosopher.

She wrote Thoughts on the Education of Women, and edited the journal Pielgrzym (Pilgrim). She has been described as an "anti-Hegelian" and a conservative.

She was born on a manor in Jasieniec that belonged to the Okęcki family where her father was employed as an administrator. She was educated by her grandmother, also Eleonor, who emphasized readings of contemporary romantic poets such as Adam Mickiewicz, Józef Bohdan Zaleski, and Franciszek Karpiński.

She published her first poems at eleven years old in 1830, in a magazine for children (Dziennik dla Dzieci), edited by Stanisław Jachowicz. Subsequently, she began contributing regularly to various periodicals, such as Tygodnik Polski, Magazyn Powszechny and Pierwiosnka, publishing literary works (short stories, fairy tales) and editorials.

She married Antoni Ziemiecki in 1834 and together with her husband left for Dresden where they lived until 1840. The family then moved to Warsaw.

== Anti-Hegelism ==
After moving to Warsaw she became interested in philosophy, including the works of John Locke, Étienne de Condillac and French spiritualists, then that of German philosophers, including Immanuel Kant, Friedrich Wilhelm Joseph Schelling and Friedrich Hegel. She made references to these philosophers in her travelogues published in Pierwiosnek.

Ziemiecka became associated with conservative Polish intelligentsia of Congress Poland who opposed the growing influence of Hegelism, seeing it as a threat to traditional values and social order. In particular she became close to the circle of traditionalist Catholic publicists with ties to the magazine Tygodnik Petersburski (Petersburg Weekly), which included Henryk Rzewuski, bishop Ignacy Hołowiński, Stanisław Chołoniewski and Michał Grabowski (so called "Petersburg clique"). Although Ziemiecka herself never became part of the circle and never published in the Tygodnik, these individuals supporter her intellectual efforts. Ziemiecka objected to the clique's servile attitude towards Russia and she saw their traditionalism as extreme. Instead, she wanted to synthesize new intellectual currents with traditional religious values.

As a result of the Petersburg connection Ziemiecka became fascinated with the philosophy of Friedrich Hegel and undertook to develop a critique of then current German philosophy, in particular its pantheistic aspects. This led to her first major philosophical work, Myśli o filozofii (Philosophical Thoughts), published in 1841. In it, she criticized Hegel and attempted to defend the autonomy of religious beliefs. On the other hand, she regarded the philosophy of Immanuel Kant in a positive light. Although this book established Ziemiecka as the first female Polish philosopher, at the time it was widely criticized by other philosophers such as Bronisław Trentowski, Edward Dembowski, and Fryderyk Henryk Lewestam. Trentowski in particular wrote in response to her work that women had no business engaging in philosophy.

In 1842 Ziemiecka founded a conservative-Catholic monthly journal Pielgrzym (Pilgrim) where she published literary, philosophical and political essays, as well as translations of French religious works. Despite support from important literary figures like Józef Ignacy Kraszewski, the journal never acquired wide readership and Ziemiecka closed it down in 1846.

== Women's issues ==
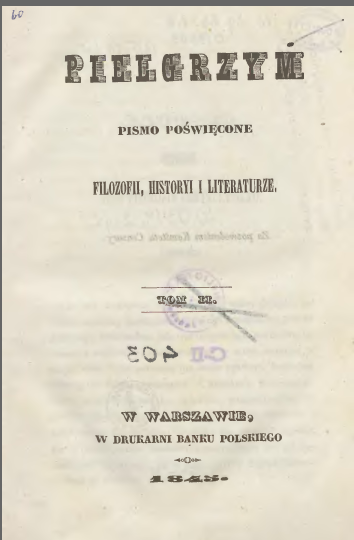
The journal Pielgrzym (Pilgrim), edited by Ziemięcka

Ziemiecka also focused on role of women in society and in particular on women's education. In 1842 she met Narcyza Żmichowska, a young author who had recently made her publishing debut in Pierwiosnek. Żmichowska was influenced by Ziemiecka, who published a number of her literary pieces in the Pielgrzym. During this time the journal became one of the main publications which focused on women's issues.

In 1843 Ziemiecka published Myśli o wychowaniu kobiet (Thoughts on the Education of Women) in which she covered the traditional calls for cultivating morality and character, but also made novel for the time appeals for providing young women with a modern education. In her opinion, a reform was needed in the sphere of women's education and upbringing, which would focus on both emotional and intellectual aspects. At the same time she also criticized romance novels, as in her view these overstimulated the imagination, were too emotional, and led to detachment from reality which resulted in family strife and failures in life.

In an 1860 issue of the journal Studia Ziemięcka published an essay "A Word About Women" in which she criticized various contemporary stereotypes of women, such as those which saw women as "angelic" and "spiritual" as well as those which held that women were inferior to men. She argued that dignity of women as well as their individuality should be recognized and respected. She based these arguments on a religious foundation, and the note was an extension of material first published in Zarys filozofii katolickiej ("Outline of Catholic Philosophy") in 1857.

== Literary works ==
She also wrote stories intended for young adults and children, published in Dziennik dla Dzieci (Children's Daily), as well as collections of short stories based on folk tales, Powiastki Ludowe (1860-1861). She also translated works of John Henry Newman (1858) and published several critical essays. Generally, in literary work, she was critical of Realism, and favored didactic and allegorical stories.
