= Olszany =

Olszany may refer to the following places in Poland:

- Olszany, Lubin County in Lower Silesian Voivodeship (south-west Poland)
- Olszany, Świdnica County in Lower Silesian Voivodeship (south-west Poland)
- Olszany, Subcarpathian Voivodeship (south-east Poland)
- Olszany, Grójec County in Masovian Voivodeship (east-central Poland)
- Olszany, Przysucha County in Masovian Voivodeship (east-central Poland)
