= Koziegłowy =

Koziegłowy may refer to the following places in Poland:

- Koziegłowy, Silesian Voivodeship, a town in south Poland
- Koziegłowy, Greater Poland Voivodeship, an urbanized village adjoining Poznań (west-central Poland)
- Koziegłowy, Grójec County in Masovian Voivodeship (east-central Poland)
- Koziegłowy, Pułtusk County in Masovian Voivodeship (east-central Poland)
- Koziegłowy, Konin County in Greater Poland Voivodeship (west-central Poland)
