= Stefan Szlachciński =

Polish politician

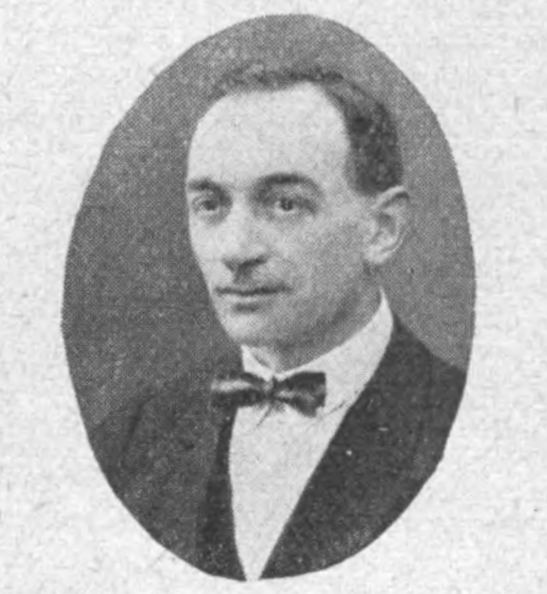

Member of the Sejm
- In office 4 March 1928 – 29 March 1930

Personal details
- Born: 20 November 1888 Congress Poland
- Died: Unknown Poland
- Party: Polish Christian Democratic Party
- Awards: Cross of Valour

Military service
- Allegiance: Second Polish Republic
- Branch/service: Polish Army
- Years of service: 1917–1922
- Rank: First lieutenant
- Unit: 50th Infantry Regiment
- Battles/wars: World War I Polish–Ukrainian War; Polish–Soviet War

Stefan Szlachciński (born 20 November 1888) was a Polish politician, member of the Polish Christian Democratic Party and member of the Sejm of the Second Polish Republic of the second term (1928–1930).

== Personal life ==
In 1906 he emigrated to the United States where he successfully completed technical studies. While in America he took an active part in "Falcon" Polish Gymnastic Society. In 1917 he entered the military school in Toronto, Canada. The same year he enrolled in Buffalo, New York as a volunteer for the Blue Army of general Józef Haller and he later served in the Polish Army in the 50th Infantry Regiment of Borderland Riflemen Francesco Nullo until January 15, 1922, achieving the rank of first lieutenant. For his service he was awarded the Cross of Valour. After the war he worked as a factory general manager for Wagon Factory specializing in the assembly of railway wagons and the repair of rolling stock.

On 15 August 1940, he was interned at the Auschwitz concentration camp as a political prisoner. His inmate number was 1797. During the war, Szlachciński was transferred to a subcamp of the Dachau concentration camp located outside Augsburg. This subcamp supplied approximately 1,300 forced laborers to the local military-related industry, especially to the Messerschmitt AG military aircraft firm. Szlachciński attempted to contact his family from the camp, but his later fate remains unknown.
