= Rylski =

Rylski (Polish feminine: Rylska; plural: Rylscy) is a surname. Notable people with this surname include:

- Aleksander Ścibor-Rylski (1928–1983), a Polish filmmaker
- Barbara Rylska (1936–2025), a Polish actress and comedian
- Feliks Rylski (1770–1823), a Polish military officer
- Jacek Rylski (born 1956), a Polish rower
- Zbigniew Ścibor-Rylski (1917–2018), a Polish general

== See also ==
- Rylsky (disambiguation)
