= Tworki (disambiguation) =

Tworki is a district of Pruszków.

Tworki may also refer to the following villages:

- Tworki, Podlaskie Voivodeship (north-east Poland)
- Tworki, Grójec County in Masovian Voivodeship (east-central Poland)
- Tworki, Siedlce County in Masovian Voivodeship (east-central Poland)
