= Nowy Miedzechów =

- Village
- Location within Poland
- Coordinates: 51°49′N 21°0′E
- Country: Poland
- Voivodeship: Masovian
- County: Grójec
- Gmina: Jasieniec
- Population: 160

Nowy Miedzechów [ˈnɔvɨ mjɛˈd͡zɛxuf] is a village in the administrative district of Gmina Jasieniec, within Grójec County, Masovian Voivodeship, in east-central Poland.
