= Czachów, Masovian Voivodeship =

Czachów
- Village
- Location within Poland
- Coordinates: 51°50′N 20°56′E
- Country: Poland
- Voivodeship: Masovian
- County: Grójec
- Gmina: Jasieniec

Czachów [ˈt͡ʂaxuf] is a village in the administrative district of Gmina Jasieniec, within Grójec County, Masovian Voivodeship, in east-central Poland.
