= Radical Peasant Party =

Political party in interbellum Poland

Radical Peasant Party Chłopskie Stronnictwo Radykalne
- Abbreviation: ChSR
- Leader: Eugeniusz Okoń
- Founders: Tomasz Dąbal and Eugeniusz Okoń
- Founded: 1919
- Dissolved: 1929
- Newspaper: Jedność Chłopska (transl. Peasant Unity), Chłopska Sprawa (transl. Peasant Affairs)
- Ideology: Christian left Agrarianism; Peasant movement
- Political position: Left-wing
- Slogan: Nienawiść do panów (transl. Hatred of Lords)

The Radical Peasant Party (Polish: Chłopskie Stronnictwo Radykalne, ChSR) was a political party in the Second Polish Republic.

== History ==
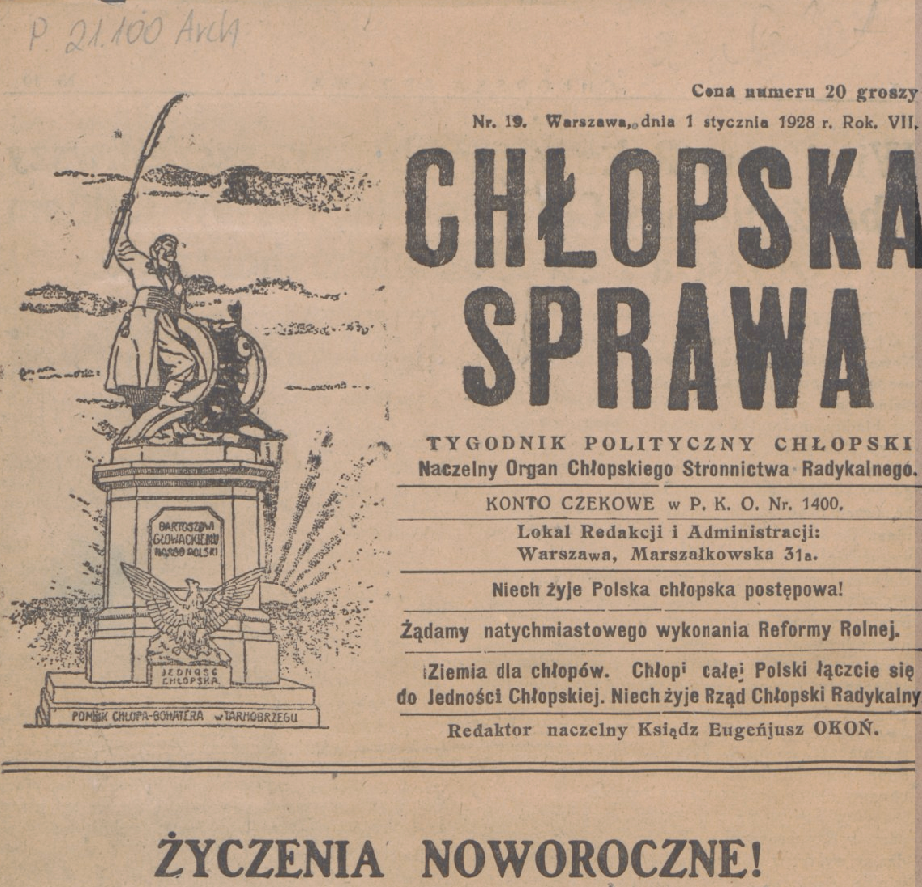
Banner of the party's newspaper Chłopska Sprawa, January 1928

The party was established in 1919, with the radical priest Eugeniusz Okoń and Tomasz Dąbal amongst its founders. It received around 1% of the vote in the 1922 elections, winning four seats in the Sejm. However, two MPs left to join the new Peasant Party in 1926.

The 1928 elections saw the ChSR's vote share fall to 0.4%, and it lost all its seats in the Sejm. It ceased to exist the following year.
