= Bronisławów, Gmina Jasieniec =

Bronisławów
- Village
- Location within Poland
- Coordinates: 51°50′14″N 21°4′28″E
- Country: Poland
- Voivodeship: Masovian
- County: Grójec
- Gmina: Jasieniec
- Population: 130

Bronisławów [brɔniˈswavuf] is a village in the administrative district of Gmina Jasieniec, within Grójec County, Masovian Voivodeship, in east-central Poland.
