= Osiny, Grójec County =

Osiny
- Village
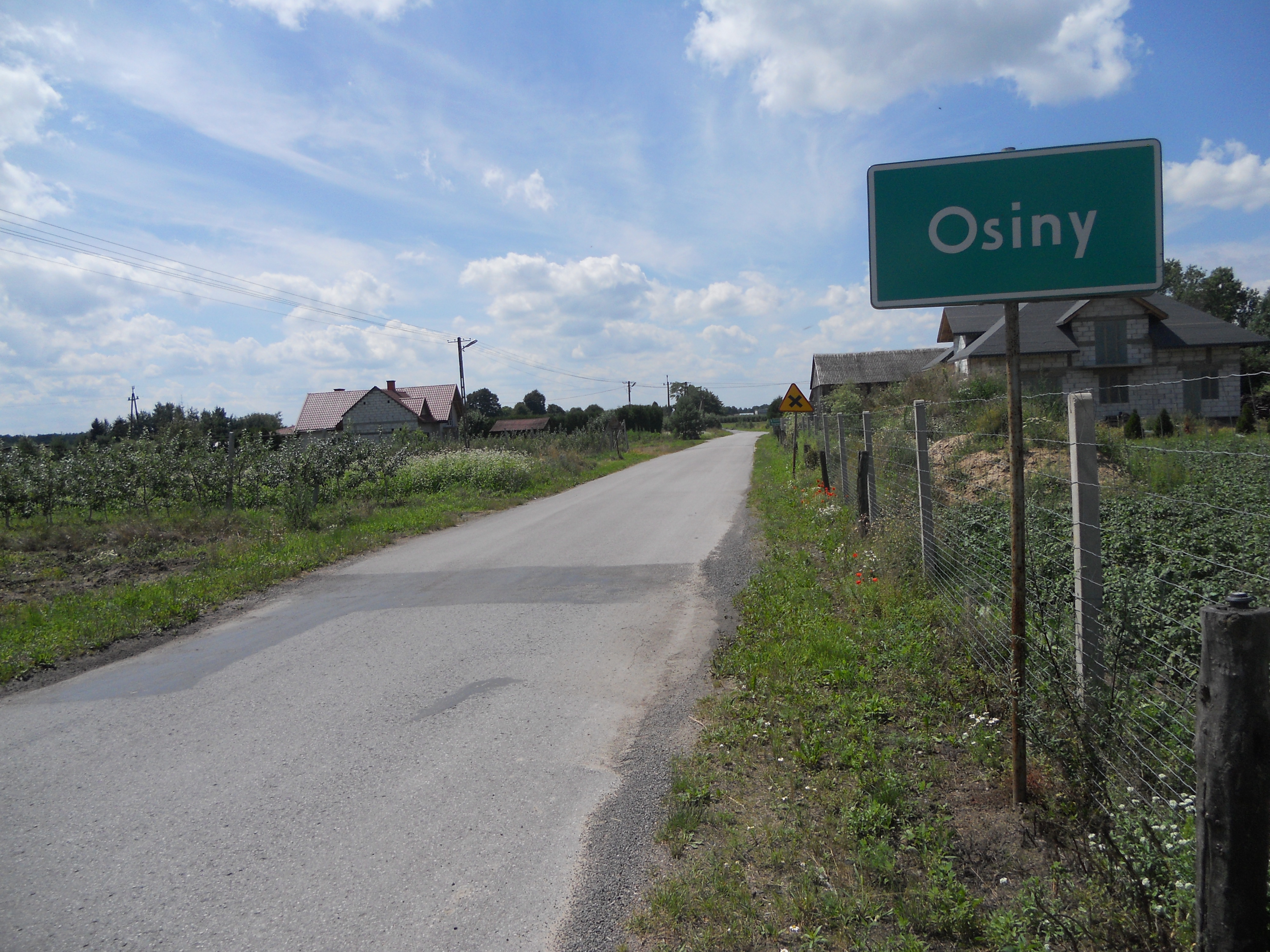

- Location within Poland
- Coordinates: 51°47′49″N 21°0′42″E
- Country: Poland
- Voivodeship: Masovian
- County: Grójec
- Gmina: Jasieniec

Population
  - Total: 150
- Time zone: UTC+1 (CET)
  - Summer (DST): UTC+2 (CEST)
- Vehicle registration: WGR

Osiny [ɔˈɕinɨ] is a village in the administrative district of Gmina Jasieniec, within Grójec County, Masovian Voivodeship, in east-central Poland.
