= Leżne =

- Village
- Location within Poland
- Coordinates: 51°46′N 20°59′E
- Country: Poland
- Voivodeship: Masovian
- County: Grójec
- Gmina: Jasieniec

Leżne [ˈlɛʐnɛ] is a village in the administrative district of Gmina Jasieniec, within Grójec County, Masovian Voivodeship, in east-central Poland.
