= Przydróżek =

- Village
- Location within Poland
- Coordinates: 51°46′15″N 21°0′11″E
- Country: Poland
- Voivodeship: Masovian
- County: Grójec
- Gmina: Jasieniec
- Population: 80

Przydróżek [pʂɨˈdruʐɛk] is a village in the administrative district of Gmina Jasieniec, within Grójec County, Masovian Voivodeship, in east-central Poland.
