= Warpęsy =

- Village
- Location within Poland
- Coordinates: 51°48′29″N 20°56′15″E
- Country: Poland
- Voivodeship: Masovian
- County: Grójec
- Gmina: Jasieniec

Warpęsy [varˈpɛ̃sɨ] is a village in the administrative district of Gmina Jasieniec, within Grójec County, Masovian Voivodeship, in east-central Poland.
