= Gmina Jasieniec =

Gmina Jasieniec Jasieniec Commune
- Gmina
- Flag Coat of arms
- Interactive map of Gmina Jasieniec
- Coordinates (Jasieniec): 51°50′N 20°56′E
- Country: Poland
- Voivodeship: Masovian
- County: Grójec
- Seat: Jasieniec

Area
  - Total: 107.83 km^{2} (41.63 sq mi)

Population (2006)
  - Total: 5,366
  - Density: 49.76/km^{2} (128.9/sq mi)
- Website: http://www.jasieniec.pl/

Gmina Jasieniec is a rural gmina (administrative district) in Grójec County, Masovian Voivodeship, in east-central Poland. Its seat is the village of Jasieniec, which lies approximately 7 kilometres (4 mi) south-east of Grójec and 46 km (28 mi) south of Warsaw.

The gmina covers an area of 107.83 square kilometres (41.6 sq mi), and as of 2006 its total population is 5,366.

== Villages ==
Gmina Jasieniec contains the villages and settlements of Alfonsowo, Boglewice, Bronisławów, Czachów, Franciszków, Gołębiów, Gośniewice, Ignaców, Jasieniec, Koziegłowy, Kurczowa Wieś, Leżne, Łychów, Łychowska Wola, Michałówka, Miedzechów, Nowy Miedzechów, Olszany, Orzechowo, Osiny, Przydróżek, Ryszki, Rytomoczydła, Stefanków, Turowice, Turowice-Kolonia, Tworki, Warpęsy, Wierzchowina, Wola Boglewska and Zbrosza Duża.

== Neighbouring gminas ==
Gmina Jasieniec is bordered by the gminas of Belsk Duży, Chynów, Goszczyn, Grójec, Promna and Warka.
