= Michałówka, Grójec County =

Michałówka
- Village
- Location within Poland
- Coordinates: 51°46′31″N 20°58′43″E
- Country: Poland
- Voivodeship: Masovian
- County: Grójec
- Gmina: Jasieniec
- Population: 50

Michałówka [mixaˈwufka] is a village in Poland located in Masovian Voivodeship, in Grójec County, in Gmina Jasieniec. It had a population of 50 in 2005.
