= Zbrosza Duża =

- Village
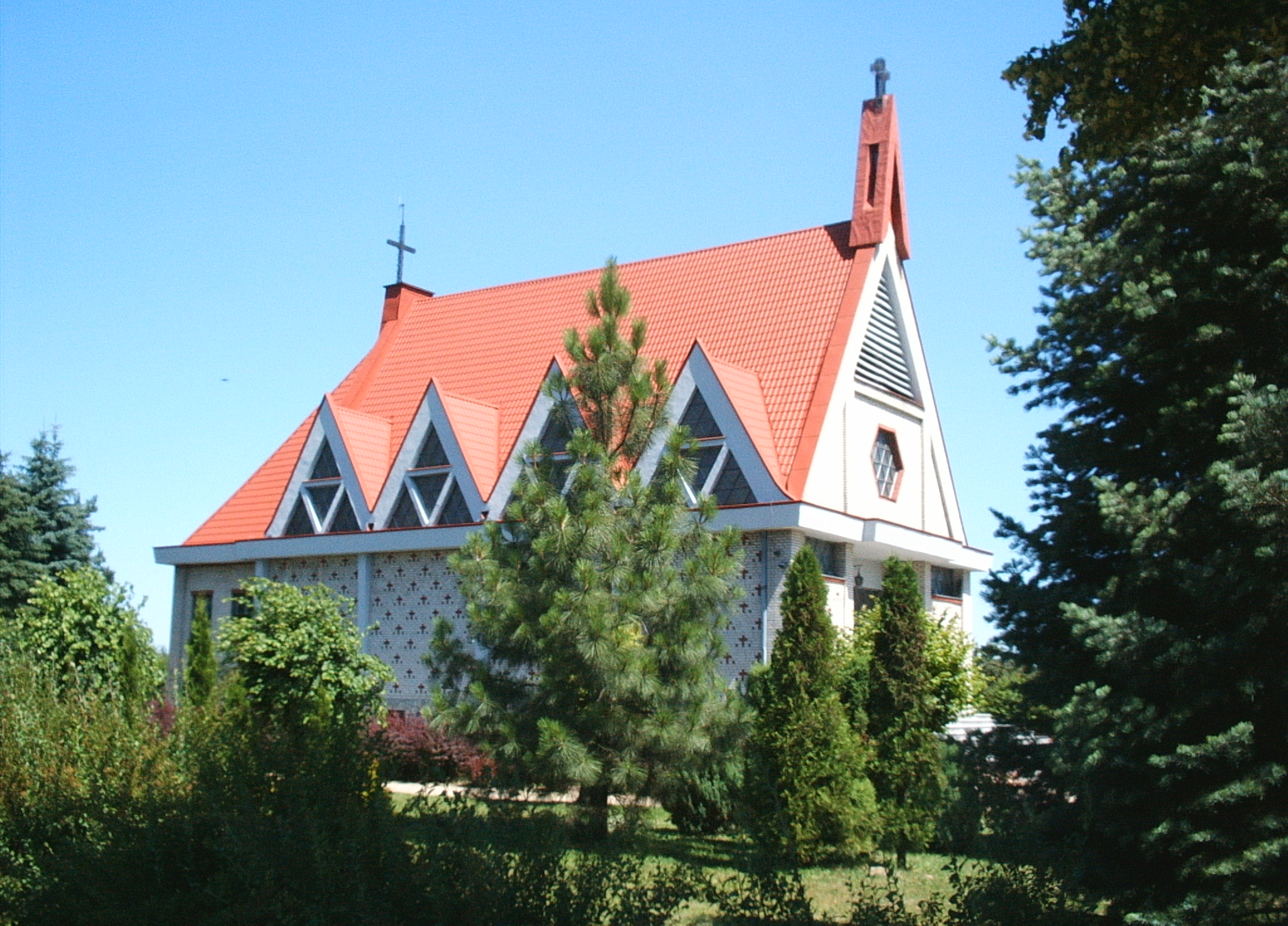
- A Catholic church in Zbrosza Duża

- Location within Poland
- Coordinates: 51°46′N 20°58′E
- Country: Poland
- Voivodeship: Masovian
- County: Grójec
- Gmina: Jasieniec

Zbrosza Duża [ˈzbrɔʂa ˈduʐa] is a village in the administrative district of Gmina Jasieniec, within Grójec County, Masovian Voivodeship, in east-central Poland.

== History ==
During the 1980s, the historian Alina Cała helped established a folk high school in the village.
