= Gołębiów, Grójec County =

Gołębiów
- Village
- Location within Poland
- Coordinates: 51°49′35″N 21°3′45″E
- Country: Poland
- Voivodeship: Masovian
- County: Grójec
- Gmina: Jasieniec
- Population: 60

Gołębiów [ɡɔˈwɛmbjuf] is a village in the administrative district of Gmina Jasieniec, within Grójec County, Masovian Voivodeship, in east-central Poland.
