= Łychów =

- Village
- Location within Poland
- Coordinates: 51°47′N 20°59′E
- Country: Poland
- Voivodeship: Masovian
- County: Grójec
- Gmina: Jasieniec

Łychów [ˈwɨxuf] is a village in the administrative district of Gmina Jasieniec, within Grójec County, Masovian Voivodeship, in east-central Poland.
