= Turowice-Kolonia =

- Village
- Location within Poland
- Coordinates: 51°49′20″N 20°53′36″E
- Country: Poland
- Voivodeship: Masovian
- County: Grójec
- Gmina: Jasieniec

Turowice-Kolonia [turɔˈvit͡sɛ kɔˈlɔɲa] is a village in the administrative district of Gmina Jasieniec, within Grójec County, Masovian Voivodeship, in east-central Poland.
