= Franciszków, Gmina Jasieniec =

Franciszków
- Village
- Location within Poland
- Coordinates: 51°50′13″N 21°3′24″E
- Country: Poland
- Voivodeship: Masovian
- County: Grójec
- Gmina: Jasieniec
- Population: 150

Franciszków (Polish pronunciation: [fraɲˈt͡ɕiʂkuf]) is a village in the administrative district of Gmina Jasieniec, within Grójec County, Masovian Voivodeship, in east-central Poland.
