= Ignaców, Gmina Jasieniec =

Ignaców
- Village
- Location within Poland
- Coordinates: 51°46′38″N 21°1′36″E
- Country: Poland
- Voivodeship: Masovian
- County: Grójec
- Gmina: Jasieniec
- Population: 90

Ignaców [iɡˈnat͡suf] is a village in the administrative district of Gmina Jasieniec, within Grójec County, Masovian Voivodeship, in east-central Poland.
