= Kurczowa Wieś =

- Village
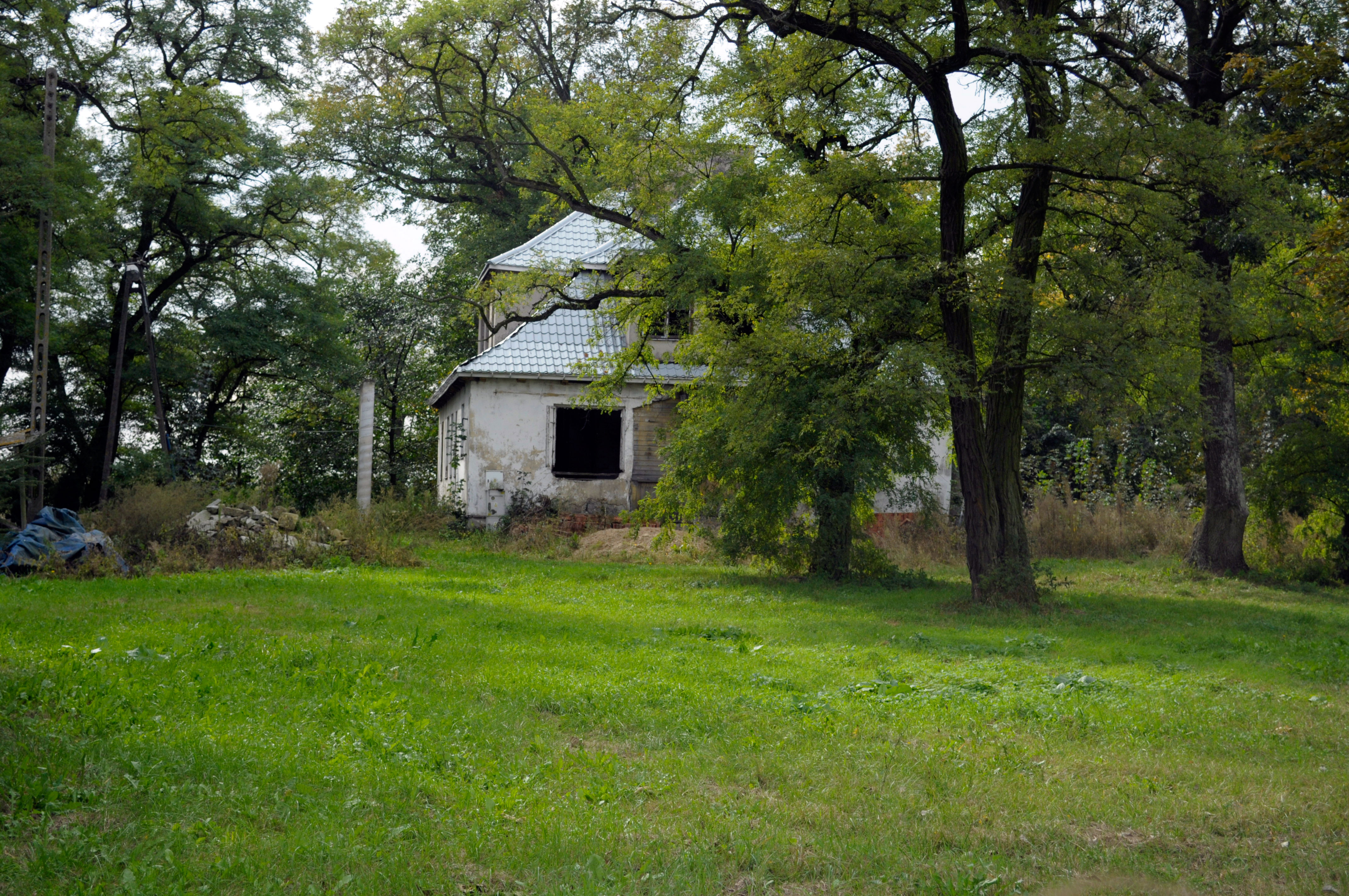

- Location within Poland
- Coordinates: 51°49′58″N 20°56′45″E
- Country: Poland
- Voivodeship: Masovian
- County: Grójec
- Gmina: Jasieniec

Kurczowa Wieś [kurˈt͡ʂɔva ˈvjɛɕ] is a village in the administrative district of Gmina Jasieniec, within Grójec County, Masovian Voivodeship, in east-central Poland.
