= Eugeniusz Okoń =

Polish priest and activist (1881–1949)

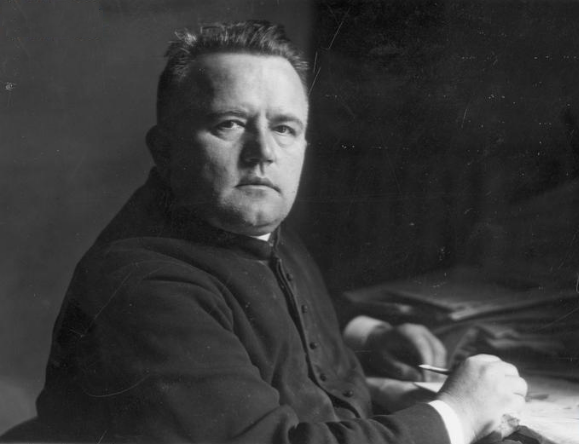
- Portrait of Okoń in March 1928
- Born: Eugeniusz Okoń; 25 December 1881; Radomyśl, Austria-Hungary
- Died: 19 January 1949 (aged 67); Olszany, Republic of Poland
- Resting place: Radomyśl nad Sanem
- Education: Jagiellonian University
- Occupations: Catholic priest, activist and politician
- Known for: Co-founder of the Republic of Tarnobrzeg
- Political party: Radical Peasant Party
- Other political affiliations: National Democracy; PSL Left; PSL Wyzwolenie
- Parent(s): Wincenty and Aniela Okoń

Eugeniusz Okoń (25 December 1881 – 19 January 1949) was a Polish priest, activist, and politician. Elected to the Diet of Galicia and Lodomeria and the Legislative Sejm of the Second Polish Republic, he was a founder of the Radical Peasant Party (ChSR), and the co-founder of the Republic of Tarnobrzeg, which was established during a popular uprising on 6 November 1918.

== Biography ==
=== Early life ===
The first of seven siblings Eugeniusz Okoń was born on Christmas 1881. His parents Wincenty and Aniela Okoń were peasants who resided in the town of Radomyśl, which at the time was located in the Austro-Hungarian Kingdom of Galicia and Lodomeria. Showing promise from an early age Okoń was sent to school in Rzeszów. After graduating he applied and was accepted to the Higher Theological Seminary in Przemyśl.

In 1906 Okoń was ordained as a priest before attending Jagiellonian University where he studied Polish philology and Philosophy. Between 1906-1916 Okoń was transferred between eight different parishes, including Świlcza from where his removal in 1911 caused protests amongst the local peasantry, before being defrocked in 1918 in response to his political activities.

=== Political career ===
After completing his studies at the Seminary in Przemyśl, Okoń became a vicar in Rudki where he soon came under the influence of local landowner and politician Aleksander Skarbek, alongside nationalist activists Stanisław Grabski and Stanisław Głąbiński who were all members of National Democracy (ND). After moving to a parish in Majdan Królewski Okoń was asked to stand in elections for the Kolbuszowa seat as a ND candidate. Due to his age Okoń was not eligible for election so it was arranged for another candidate to stand in his place who would then resign to make way for Okoń. However, after being successfully elected the ghost candidate refused to step down, while Okoń's election speeches, often targeting the szlachta and discussing issues of social justice, were at odds with the politics of ND leading to Okoń becoming disillusioned with the party.

At the end of World War I Okoń put his political ideas into action. At the start of November 1918 he led a group of peasants to tear down the border posts near Radomyśl dividing the Kingdom of Galicia and Lodomeria from the Kingdom of Poland. At a rally in Tarnobrzeg on 6 November, alongside fellow revolutionary Tomasz Dąbal, Okoń delivered a fiery speech under the statue of Wojciech Bartosz Głowacki to a crowd of 30,000 in which he declared that a day of liberation, freedom and reckoning had dawned. During the rally, the authority of the local szlachta, including Count Stanisław Tarnowski, was replaced by a newly elected congress and People's Militia. The rally is considered the founding event of the Republic of Tarnobrzeg.

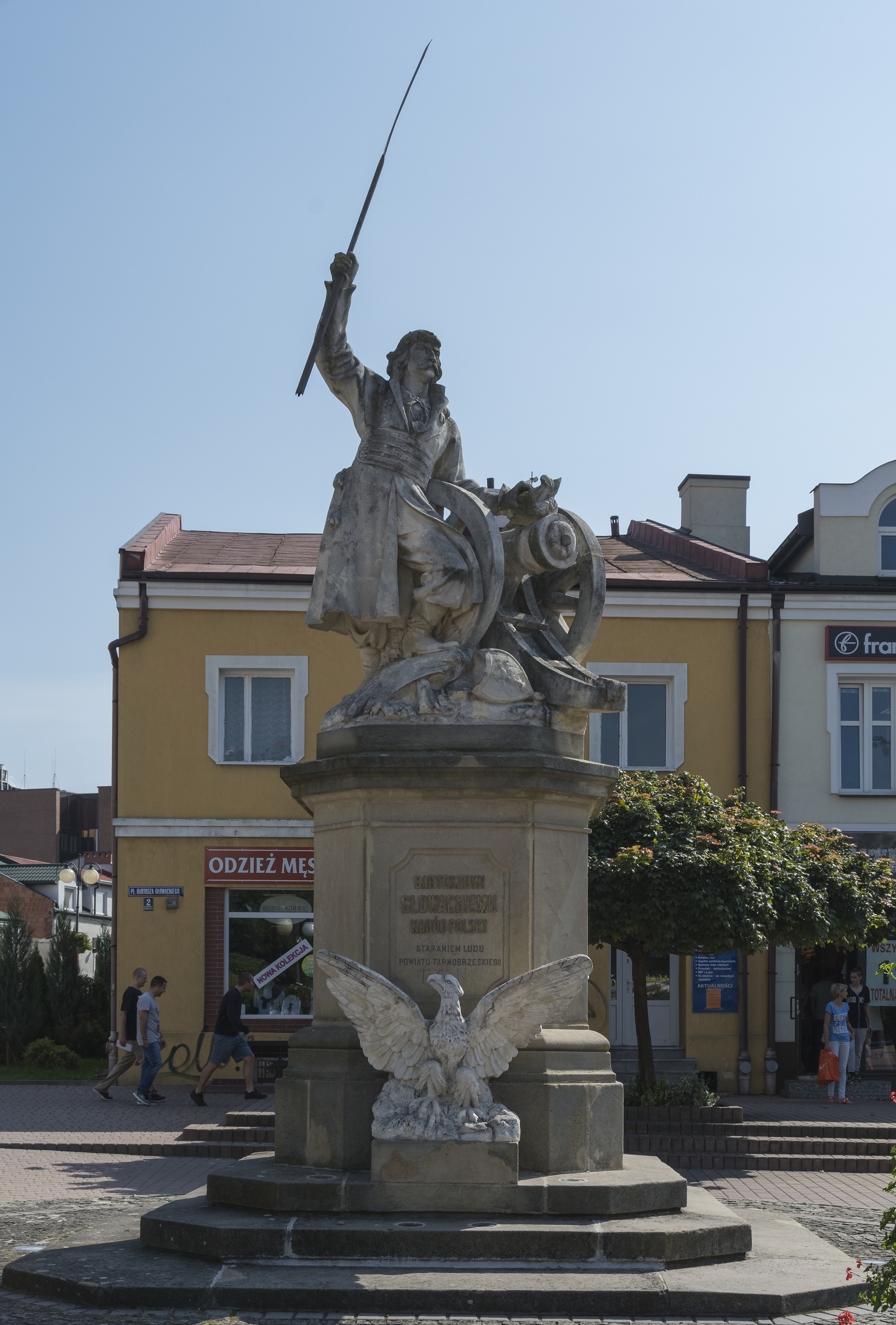
The statue of Wojciech Bartosz Głowacki under which Okoń delivered his speech at the founding of the Republic of Tarnobrzeg. Images of the monument were later used in publications of the ChSR.

By the spring of 1919, the Republic of Tarnobrzeg had been suppressed by the Polish Armed Forces, and the Polish Liquidation Committee issued an arrest warrant for Okoń who was subsequently apprehended at a rally in Baranów and sent to prison in Rzeszów. During that years parliamentary election Okoń stood for the Polish People's Party "Left", and was subsequently elected to the Legislative Sejm representing the constituencies of Kolbuszowa, Mielec, Nisko and Tarnobrzeg. As a member of the Sejm Okoń sat with the Polish People's Party "Wyzwolenie", making many speeches in which he was publicly critical of the Second Polish Republic, arguing in favour of following the historical borders as set out in the Union of Lublin, holding Ignacy Paderewski and Roman Dmowski responsible for failing to obtain Upper Silesia without the need for a plebiscite, warning about the dangers of the Polish military extending too far east during the Polish–Soviet War, and criticising the creation of the Council of National Defense as undemocratic.

On 19 December 1919 Okoń announced the founding of the ChSR alongside Dąbal, although the latter would leave to join the Communist Party of Poland the following year. In the early 1920s Okoń began to successfully campaign for the ChSR amongst the ethnic Kurpie under the slogan Nienawiść do panów (transl. Hatred of Lords). In the 1922 elections Okoń gained over 1000 votes whilst standing for ChSR in the Turośl district. He organised rallies that attracted large crowds of Kurpies in Myszyniec, Kadzidło, Dylewo and Dąbrówka in 1924 and 1925, and is reputed to have organised a secret society of Kurpie peasants in Cieciory, and instigated rioting against taxes in Kolno. As a result of his activities Okoń drew the ire of local politicians such as Adam Chętnik, and was regularly slandered in the press being accused of Bolshevism, while his movement was compared to the Mariavites.

Okoń was unable to stand in the 1928 elections as he was imprisoned in Lublin on charges of inciting the peasantry. Following his release from prison he was left destitute and decided to return to the Catholic Church. After doing penance in Dukla he was once again allowed to perform his duties as a priest. During World War II Okoń resisted the Nazi occupation, organising false documents and shelter for Jews before having to go into hiding in 1942.

=== Death ===
In 1948 Okoń was sent to administer to a parish in Olszany, however plagued by ill health and the stress of unfounded court cases against him he committed suicide on 19 January 1949. Following his last wishes Okoń was buried in his birth town of Radomyśl, where his funeral cortege stretched for 6 kilometres.
