= Wola Boglewska =

- Village
- Location within Poland
- Coordinates: 51°49′21″N 20°58′53″E
- Country: Poland
- Voivodeship: Masovian
- County: Grójec
- Gmina: Jasieniec
- Population: 260

Wola Boglewska [ˈvɔla bɔˈɡlɛfska] is a village in the administrative district of Gmina Jasieniec, within Grójec County, Masovian Voivodeship, in east-central Poland.
