= Gośniewice, Gmina Jasieniec =

Village in Gmina Jasieniec, Poland

Gośniewice
- Village
- Location within Poland
- Coordinates: 51°47′43″N 20°57′07″E
- Country: Poland
- Voivodeship: Masovian
- County: Grójec
- Gmina: Jasieniec

Gośniewice [ɡɔɕɲɛˈvit͡sɛ] is a village in the administrative district of Gmina Jasieniec, within Grójec County, Masovian Voivodeship, in east-central Poland.
