= Children's Daily =

Polish newspaper for children

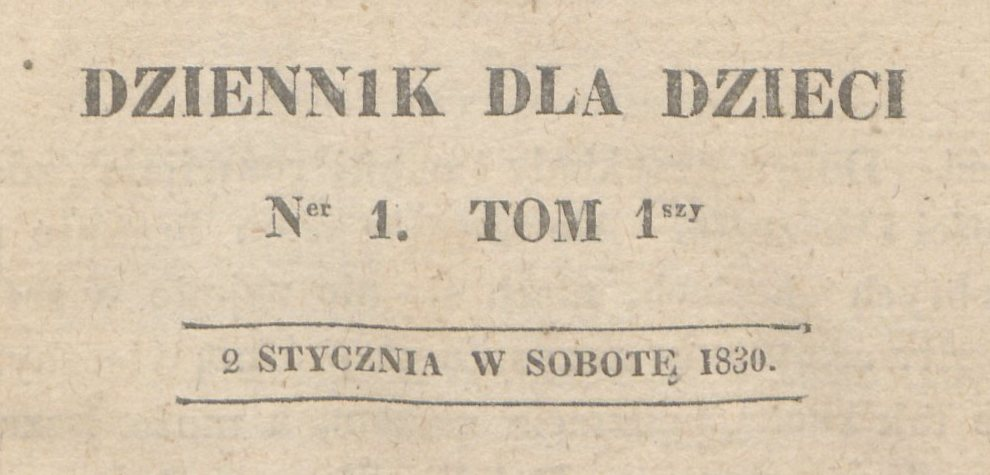
First issue

Dziennik dla dzieci (English: Children's Daily) was the first daily newspaper marketed for children, published in Warsaw from January 2 to December 31, 1830. It was one of several periodicals aimed at children published in the partitioned Poland. It was established and run by Stanisław Jachowicz, a renowned Polish educator, philanthropist, poet, and fabulist. Aimed at children of wealthy families, it developed social and civic education of the youngest generation through articles on festivals, current events, nature, maths, tourism, Polish language etc. as well as through reviews of children's literature. The daily actively engaged its audience by publishing texts submitted by children. It was discontinued after 299 issues.
