= Stefanków, Grójec County =

Stefanków
- Village
- Location within Poland
- Coordinates: 51°51′N 21°3′E
- Country: Poland
- Voivodeship: Masovian
- County: Grójec
- Gmina: Jasieniec
- Population: 90

Stefanków [stɛˈfaŋkuf] is a village in the administrative district of Gmina Jasieniec, within Grójec County, Masovian Voivodeship, in east-central Poland.
