= Feliks Rylski =

Polish military officer (1770–1823)

- Born: 14 January 1770; Turowice, Masovian Voivodeship, Polish–Lithuanian Commonwealth (now part of Poland)
- Died: 16 August 1823 (aged 53); Warsaw, Kingdom of Poland
- Military career
- Allegiance: Polish–Lithuanian Commonwealth (1783–1795); French First Republic (1798–1804); First French Empire (1804–1807); Duchy of Warsaw (1807–1815); Kingdom of Poland (1815–1823)
- Branch: Crown Army (1783–1795); Polish Legions (1798–1807); Army of the Duchy of Warsaw (1807–1915); Army of the Kingdom of Poland (1815–1823)
- Service years: 1783–1823
- Rank: Lieutenant (1798–1808); Captain (1808–1823)
- Units: 16th Regiment of Crown Infantry (1783–1794); 4th Infantry Regiment (1808–1815); 1st Company of Invalides (1815–1823)
- Conflicts: Kościuszko Uprising (1794) War of the First Coalition (1793–1797): Italian campaign of 1796–1797; War of the Second Coalition (1798–1802): Marengo campaign (1800); Siege of Porto Ferrajo (1801); War of the Third Coalition (1805–1806); Peninsular War (1808–1812); French invasion of Russia (1812); War of the Sixth Coalition (1813): German campaign of 1813

Feliks Rylski (Polish: [ˈfɛ.liks ˈrɘ̟l.ski]; 14 January 1770 – 16 August 1823) was a Polish military officer and nobleman. From 1783, he served in the Crown Army, the military forces of the Polish–Lithuanian Commonwealth. He fought in Kościuszko Uprising in 1794. In 1798, he joined the Polish Legions, the military units which served with the Great Army of France in the Napoleonic era. He fought as a lieutenant in the French Revolutionary Wars, including the wars of the First, Second, and Third Coalitions. From 1807, he served in the Army of the Duchy of Warsaw as a captain, and fought in the Peninsular War, the French invasion of Russia, and the War of the Sixth Coalition. Afterwards, from 1815, he served in the Army of the Kingdom of Poland. Rylski belonged to minor nobility, as part of the heraldic clan of Ostoja.

== Biography ==
The Ostoja coat of arms.

Feliks Rylski was born in the village of Turowice, then located within the Masovian Voivodeship of Polish–Lithuanian Commonwealth. Currently, it forms a part of Grójec County within the Masovian Voivodeship in Poland. He was the son of Wojciech Rylski and Katarzyna Rylska (née Gębska). His family was a minor nobility, belonging to the heraldic clan of Ostoja.

Rylski joined the Crown Army, the military forces of the Polish–Lithuanian Commonwealth, on 18 December 1783, serving in the 16th Regiment of Crown Infantry. He served with the insurgents during the Kościuszko Uprising in 1794. He participated in the battle of Maciejowice on 10 October 1794, and in the battle of Praga on 4 November 1794. After the battle, he was a Russian prisoner of war, being later released.

In the spring of 1798, Rylski made his way to Italy, where he joined the Polish Legions, the military units which served with the Great Army of France in the Napoleonic era. He had the rank of the lieutenant. Rylski served in the French Revolutionary and Napoleonic Wars, including in the battles of Peschiera (1796), Trebbia (1799), Novi (1799), and Montebello, the skirmishes on Var river (1800), the siege of Porto Ferrajo (1801), and the battle of Castelfranco Veneto (1805). Later, Rylski returned to Poland, where, following the Polish Campaign of 1807 in the War of the Fourth Coalition, and the formation of the Duchy of Warsaw, he was awarded with the Order of Virtuti Militari in 1808, the highest military decoration of Poland. He became a captain in the Army of the Duchy of Warsaw, and the battalion chief in the 4th Infantry Regiment.

Rylski fought in the Peninsular War, in the battles of Talavera and Ocaña in 1809, and Almaraz in 1812. He also participated in the French invasion of Russia in 1812, in the battles of Chashniki, Krasnoi, and Berezina. He was wounded in the latter, and was awarded the Imperial Order of the Legion of Honour for his service in 1813. Later, he participated in the German campaign of 1813 during the War of the Sixth Coalition. He fought in the battle of Leipzig, during which, he was wounded, and was discovered in the battlefield afterwards. He recovered from his wounds.

After the end of the Napoleonic wars and the formation of the Kingdom of Poland, Rylski served in its armed forces, in the 1st Company of Invalides, based in Warsaw, which was a part of the Invalides and Veterans Corps. He died on 16 August 1823 in Warsaw, at the age of 53.

== Awards and decorations ==
- Order of Virtuti Militari (1808)
- Imperial Order of the Legion of Honour (1813)
