= Alina Cała =

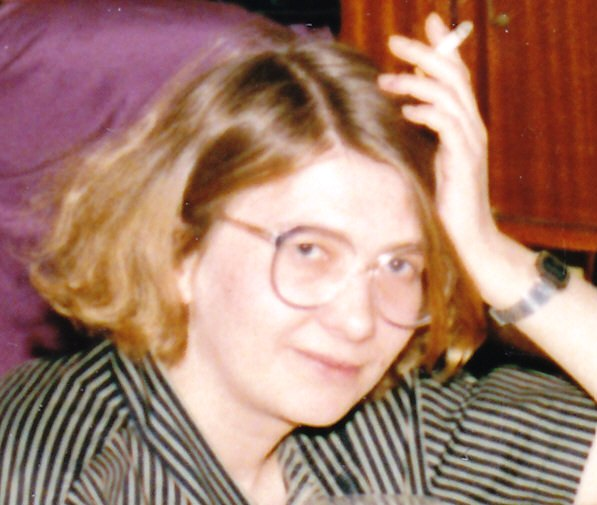
- Portrait of Cała, 1990
- Born: 1953 (age 72–73); Warsaw, Warsaw Voivodeship, Poland
- Board member of: Jewish Historical Institute
- Spouse: Stanisław Kusiński
- Awards: Knight's Cross of the Order of Merit of the Republic of Poland

Academic background
- Education: IH PAN
- Thesis: (1984)

Academic work
- Discipline: History
- Institutions: National Library
- Main interests: Polish-Jewish relations
- Political party: Greens 2004
- Website: Alina Cała publications on Academia.edu

Alina Cała (born 1953 in Warsaw) is a Polish writer, historian and sociologist. A former board member of the Jewish Historical Institute, she specialises in 19th and 20th century Polish-Jewish history, antisemitism and Jewish assimilation in Central and Eastern Europe.

== Life ==
After 1976 Cała collaborated with the Workers' Defence Committee and Committee for Social Self-defence KOR. In the 1980s she also co-founded the folk high school in Zbrosza Duża, perhaps the first institution for adult education to be independent from the Communist authorities since the end of World War II. After 1989 she has been a feminist and pro-choice activist. She has collaborated with the Greens 2004 party. In 2017 she was awarded her habilitation by the University of Warmia and Mazury in Olsztyn.

As a historian, Cała focuses mostly on Polish-Jewish relations in the last two centuries. Among her most important works is the Assimilation of Jews in the Kingdom of Poland (1864-1897) (published in 1989). Her most cited work is The Image of the Jew in Polish Folk Culture (1st edition 1987), also published since in English. In recent years she published a variety of historical books on modern Polish-Jewish history, notably the ideological views of the last generation of Jewish-Polish youth before the war, and the Polish-Jewish history between 1944 and 1968.

In a 2009 interview with the Polish newspaper Rzeczpospolita, Cała said that Poles shared responsibility for the deaths of the 3 million Jews murdered in Poland during the Nazi Holocaust. In a 2016 interview with Wprost, Cała said Poles bore responsibility for the fate of Jews who escaped into the forests, some of whom were hunted by Poles, according to publications by Jan Grabowski. Her views have been criticized by historians Andrzej Paczkowski, Piotr Gontarczyk, and Jerzy Woźniak.

=== Personal life ===
On her maternal side, Cała is descended from a left-wing family. Her great-grandmother was a participant in the Łódź insurrection, whilst her grandparents and mother were members of the Polish Socialist Party. During World War II, her mother participated in the Warsaw uprising. After the war, both her parents were members of the Polish United Workers' Party.

In 1981 Cała married the activist Stanisław Kusiński, with the ceremony taking place in the prison where he was being held in the Bieszczady Mountains. After his release Kusiński emigrated to the USA, leaving Cała behind who was pregnant. Their child was born with a severe genetic defect and died soon after.

== Awards ==
In 2011, Cała was awarded the Knight's Cross of the Order of Merit of the Republic of Poland by the then president Bronisław Komorowski. In 2015, the Minister of Culture and National Heritage, Małgorzata Omilanowska, decided to award her the Gloria Artis Medal for Merit to Culture. However, Cała declined the award.
