= Wierzchowina, Masovian Voivodeship =

Wierzchowina
- Village
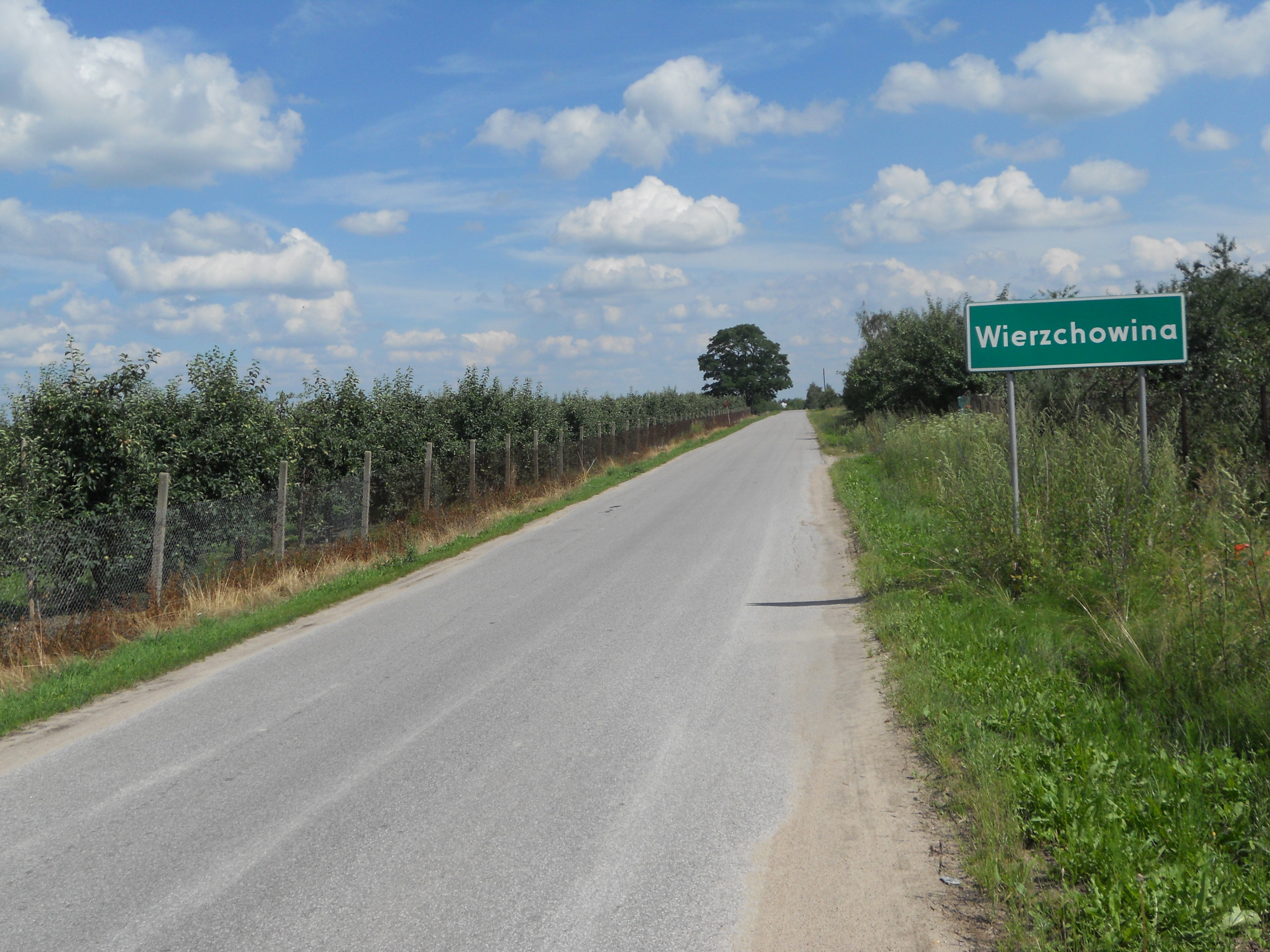

- Location within Poland
- Coordinates: 51°46′31″N 20°56′12″E
- Country: Poland
- Voivodeship: Masovian
- County: Grójec
- Gmina: Jasieniec

Wierzchowina [vjɛʂxɔˈvina] is a village in the administrative district of Gmina Jasieniec, within Grójec County, Masovian Voivodeship, in east-central Poland.
