= Turowice, Grójec County =

Turowice
- Village
- Location within Poland
- Coordinates: 51°49′N 20°55′E
- Country: Poland
- Voivodeship: Masovian
- County: Grójec
- Gmina: Jasieniec

Turowice [turɔˈvit͡sɛ] is a village in the administrative district of Gmina Jasieniec, within Grójec County, Masovian Voivodeship, in east-central Poland.

== Notable residents ==
- Feliks Rylski (1770–1823), a Polish military officer and nobleman
