= Jasieniec, Grójec County =

Jasieniec
- Village
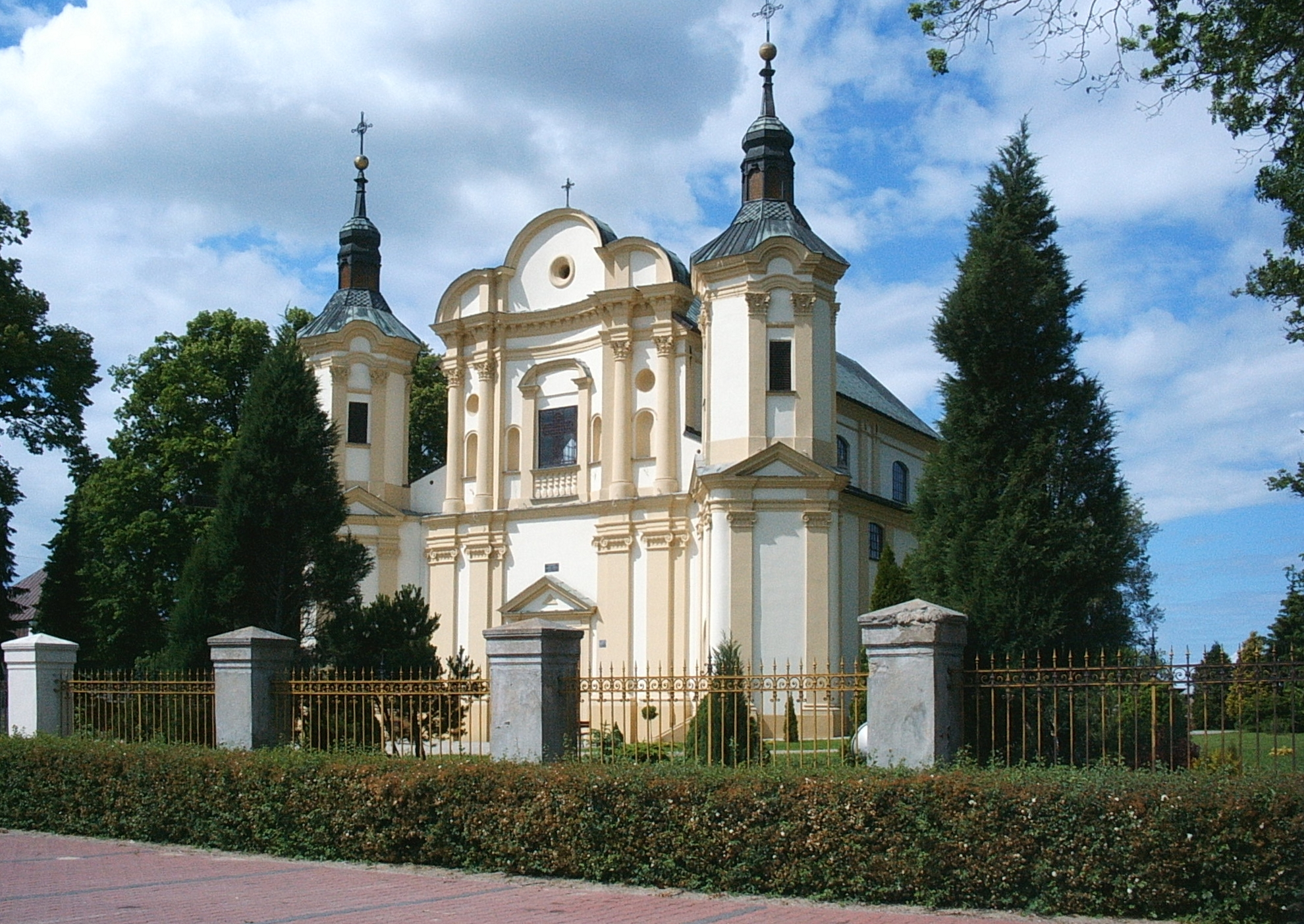
- Church of the Descent of the Holy Spirit

- Location within Poland
- Coordinates: 51°50′N 20°56′E
- Country: Poland
- Voivodeship: Masovian
- County: Grójec
- Gmina: Jasieniec
- Population: 1,200
- Website: https://www.jasieniec.pl

Jasieniec [jaˈɕɛɲɛt͡s] is a village in Grójec County, Masovian Voivodeship, in east-central Poland. It is the seat of the gmina (administrative district) called Gmina Jasieniec.
