= Republic of Tarnobrzeg =

Polish post-WWI entity (1918–1919)

Republic of Tarnobrzeg Republika Tarnobrzeska (Polish)
- 1918–1919
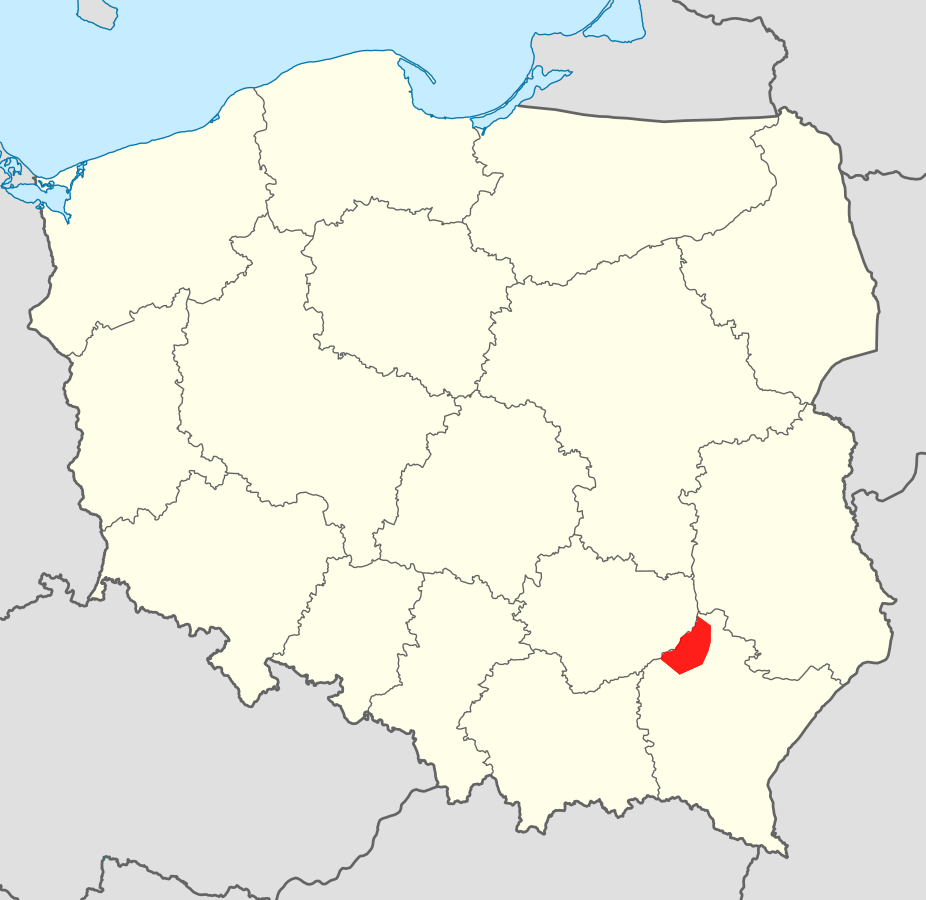
- Status: Soviet republic
- Capital: Tarnobrzeg
- Common languages: Polish
- Religion: Catholicism
- Government: Republic^{a}
  - President: Tomasz Dąbal (last)
- Historical era: Aftermath of World War I
  - Established: 6 November 1918
  - Disestablished: Spring 1919
Preceded by	Succeeded by
Kingdom of Poland	Second Polish Republic
- Today part of: Poland
- a. Soviet republic intended.

The Republic of Tarnobrzeg (Polish: Republika Tarnobrzeska, IPA: [rɛpuˈblika tarnɔˈbʐɛska]) was a short-lived political entity, proclaimed on 6 November 1918 in the Polish town of Tarnobrzeg. Its main founders were two socialist activists, Tomasz Dąbal and Eugeniusz Okoń.

== History ==
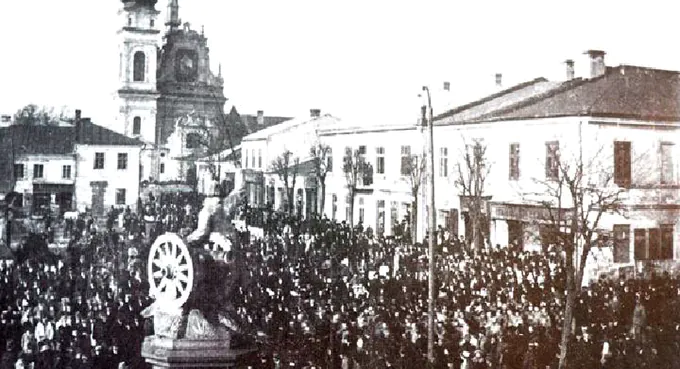
A rally by the statue of Bartosz Głowacki in Tarnobrzeg during the Republic, 1918

The idea of the Republic had its roots in mass demonstrations of peasants, which were taking place almost on a daily basis in the fall of 1918. Tarnobrzeg had been part of Austria-Hungary (Kingdom of Galicia and Lodomeria) and the dissolution of this entity created political unrest. On 6 November, after a demonstration with some 30,000 people, local peasants decided to take advantage of it and seize power.

As news of the Russian Revolution came to Tarnobrzeg, socialist activists decided to follow communist ideas. They demanded the liquidation of capitalist government and the introduction of a land reform, which would result in taking away land from rich owners and giving it to the poor peasantry. Also, directed by Okoń and Dąbal, the peasants started to organize local administration as well as a peasants' militia.

The Republic of Tarnobrzeg was suppressed by units of the freshly created Polish Army at the beginning of 1919. Father Okoń was arrested but soon released when the locals elected him to the Polish Parliament.

== See also ==
- First Republic of Pińczów
- Komańcza Republic
- Lemko Republic
- Republic of Gniew
- Republic of Ostrów
- Republic of Zakopane
- List of historical unrecognized states and dependencies
