= Tomasz Dąbal =

Polish activist

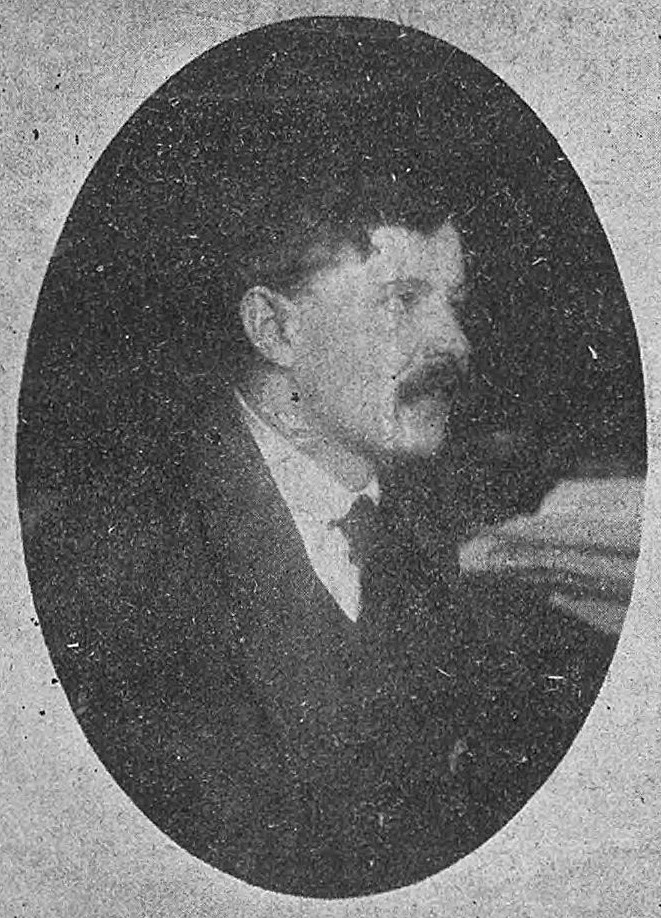
- Portrait of Dąbal from the Nowości Ilustrowane newspaper, 1922
- Born: Tomasz Jan Dąbal; 29 December 1890; Sobów, Austria-Hungary
- Died: 21 August 1937 (aged 46); Moscow, Soviet Union
- Occupations: Activist and politician
- Political party: CPB
- Other political affiliations: PSL; PSL Lewica; ChSR; KPRP

Tomasz Jan Dąbal (Polish pronunciation: [ˈtɔmaʐ ˈdɔmbal]; 29 December 1890 – 21 August 1937) was a Polish lawyer, activist of the interwar period and politician. He was the co-founder and the head of state of the Republic of Tarnobrzeg, succeeded by the Second Polish Republic.

== Life ==
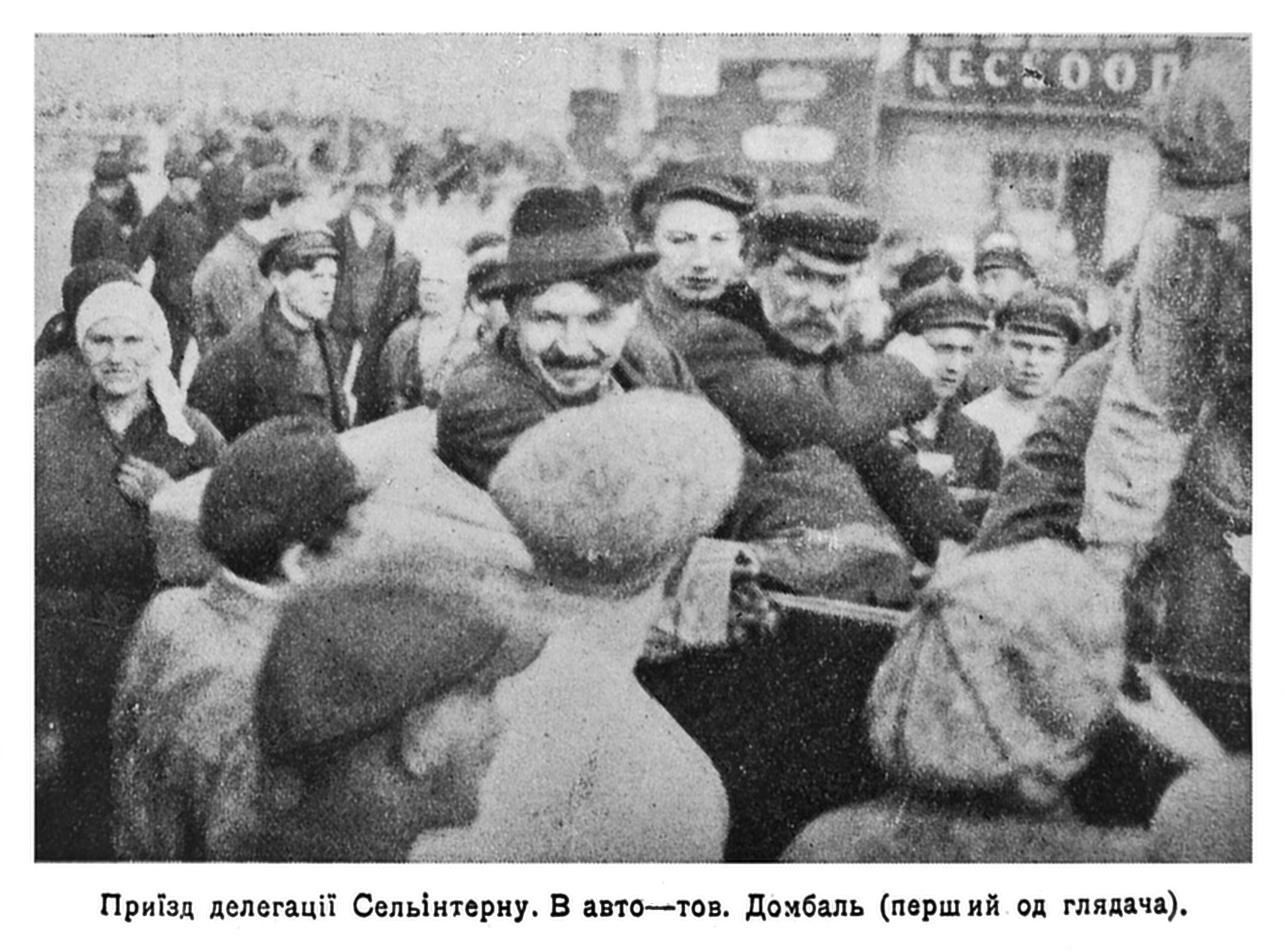
Dąbal in Kiev in 1925

Tomasz Jan Dąbal was born 29 December 1890 in Sobów, Poland. In 1909–1914, he studied law in Vienna and medicine in Kraków and joined the Polish People's Party (1911).

During World War I he served in the 87th Infantry Regiment of the Austro-Hungarian Army on the Russian, Balkan and Italian fronts. Wounded three times, he reached the rank of captain. In January 1917 he was assigned to the 3rd Legion Infantry Regiment as a machine gun instructor. Towards the end of the war he was arrested for political activities in the Austrian army and imprisoned for two months in a camp in Udine.

After the collapse of Austria-Hungary he returned to Poland. In early November 1918, as a special representative of the Polish Liquidation Commission in Kraków, he took command of gendarmerie units in the Tarnobrzeg, Mielec, Nisko and Kolbuszowa counties. He transformed the units into the People's Militia.

With Eugeniusz Okoń, he was a founder of the Republic of Tarnobrzeg on 6 November 1918. He was a member of the Polish People's Party "Left" and later the Radical Peasant Party, which he co-founded with Okoń. He served as a deputy to the Polish Sejm from 1918 to 1921.

He joined the Communist Party of Poland (KPRP) in 1920. A few days before the Battle of Warsaw he made a statement in the Sejm containing the words: "I do not consider the Red Army an enemy. On the contrary, I welcome it as a friend of the Polish Nation". This fact was meticulously exploited by the Soviet propaganda apparatus.

In July 1921, together with Stanisław Łańcucki, he formed the Sejm Faction of Communist Deputies. In November 1921, he was stripped of his parliamentary immunity and put on trial for attempting to overthrow the state system. On 7 July 1922, he was sentenced to six years of hard labor. In 1923, as part of an exchange of political prisoners, he left for the USSR, where he was active in the Central Committee of the Communist Party of Byelorussia (CPB).

In 1923–1925, he was a deputy member of the Central Committee of the KPRP. He co-organized the Peasant International – in 1923–1928, he was deputy secretary general of that organization. Deputy chairman of the Executive Committee and deputy secretary general of the International Red Aid, secretary of the Agrarian Commission at the Executive Committee of the Comintern. He graduated from the Faculty of Agriculture and the Faculty of Economics and World Politics at the Institute of Red Professors (1930–1932, with distinction), and in 1934 he obtained a doctorate in economics.

After Stalin's rise to power, he moved to Minsk where he became vice-president of the Belarusian Academy of Sciences. From 1932 to 1937 he also was a member of the Central Committee of the CPB. He was also active in educational and propaganda work in Marchlevshchyna, a Polish autonomous region in Soviet Ukraine.

Like most of the Polish communist activists in the Soviet Union he was arrested and executed during the Great Purge, after a confession was extracted from him in which he claimed to have directed the Polish Military Organization in the entire Soviet Union. He was rehabilitated by the Military Collegium of the Supreme Court of the USSR on 21 December 1955.

== Sources ==
- Henryk Cimek, Tomasz Dąbal: 1890-1937, Wyższa Szkoła Pedagogiczna, 1993.
- Томаш Францевич Домбаль родился

== See also ==
- Bruno Jasieński
