= Stanisław Jachowicz =

Polish poet (1796–1857)

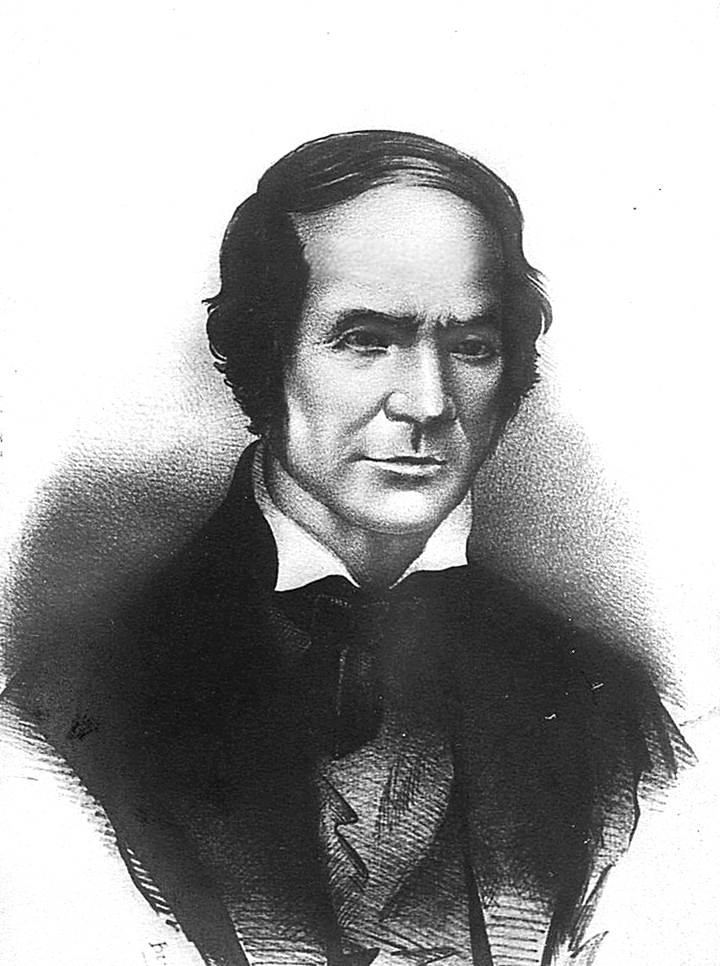
Stanisław Jachowicz

Stanisław Jachowicz (17 April 1796 in Dzików near Tarnobrzeg - 24 December 1857 in Warsaw) was a Polish educator, poet and children's book author. He is regarded as the founding father of children's literature in Poland.

Jachowicz was born to a not wealthy noble family in Dzików near Tarnobrzeg. He left home when he was 8 years old and entered various schools. He eventually studied at the Philosophical Faculty of the University of Lwów.

Jachowicz devoted most of his life to children. He wrote numerous fairy tales, founded the first daily newspaper for children in Europe and wrote the first song book for children in Poland. He also financially supported orphans from the November Uprising and poor children of Warsaw.

== Works ==
- Bajki i powieści (1824)
- Bajki i powiastki (vol. 1-4) (1842-1847)
- Sto nowych powiastek (1853)
- Źródło wiadomości dla dziatek polskich (1849)
- Pisma różne wierszem (1853)
- Śpiewy dla dzieci (1854)
- Rady wuja dla siostrzenic (1855)
- Rozrywki dla młodzieży rzemieślniczej (vol. 1-2) (1856–1857)
- Dzieciom na pamiątkę. Wiązanka z dziejów Polski (1900)
