= Olszany, Grójec County =

Olszany
- Village
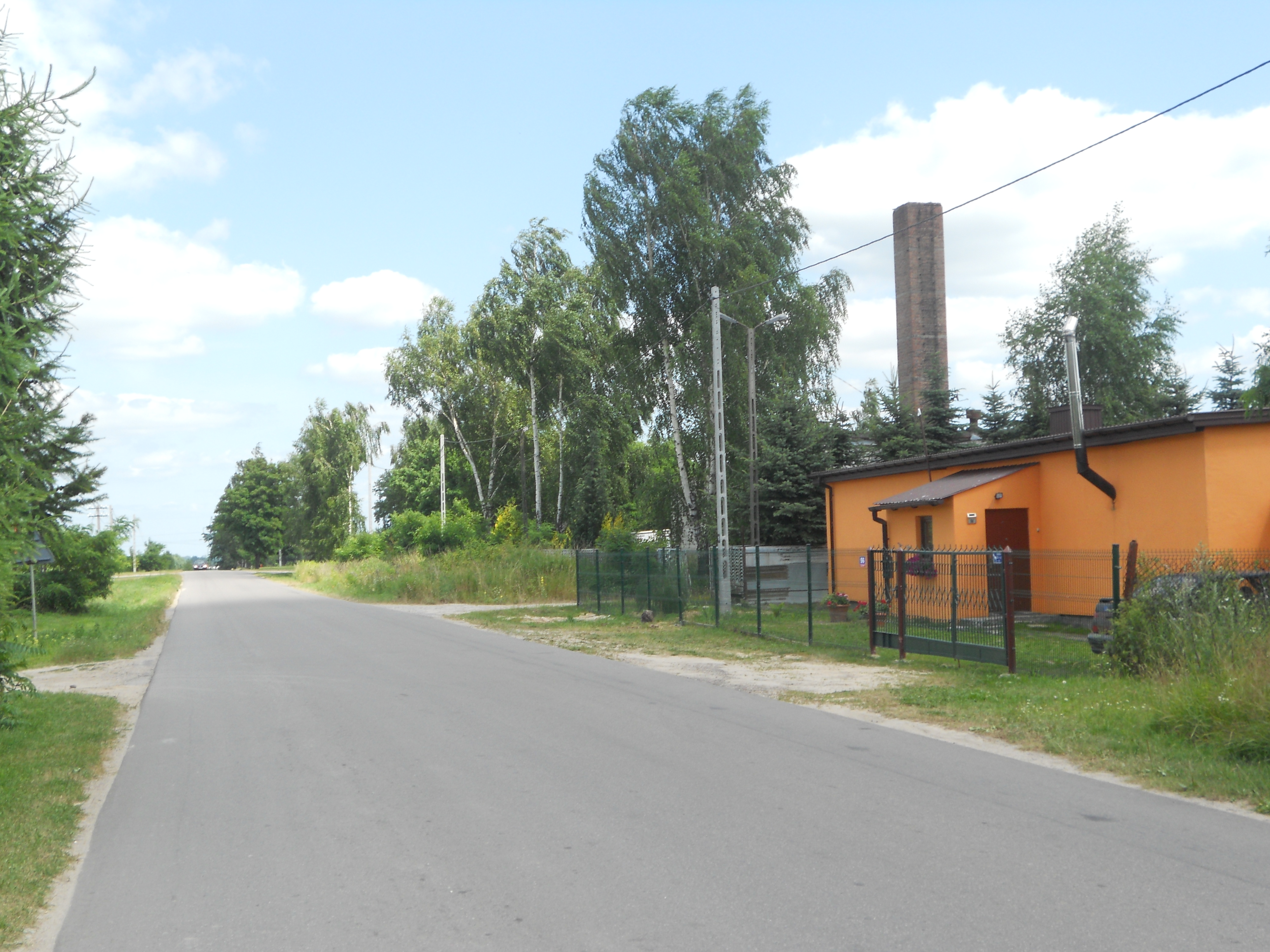
- Roadside house in Olszany

- Location within Poland
- Coordinates: 51°50′14″N 20°57′45″E
- Country: Poland
- Voivodeship: Masovian
- County: Grójec
- Gmina: Jasieniec

Olszany [ɔlˈʂanɨ] is a village in the administrative district of Gmina Jasieniec, within Grójec County, Masovian Voivodeship, in east-central Poland.
