= Koziegłowy, Grójec County =

Koziegłowy
- Village
- Location within Poland
- Coordinates: 51°46′N 21°0′E
- Country: Poland
- Voivodeship: Masovian
- County: Grójec
- Gmina: Jasieniec

Koziegłowy [kɔʑɛˈɡwɔvɨ] is a village in the administrative district of Gmina Jasieniec, within Grójec County, Masovian Voivodeship, in east-central Poland.
