= Lieutenant (Poland) =

Polish Army rank

Porucznik (por.) is a rank of the Polish Army. It is roughly equivalent to the military rank of the First Lieutenant in the armed forces of other countries. In the Polish Army, a porucznik is included in the corps of junior officers. The rank directly under is podporucznik (ppor.), which is equivalent to a second lieutenant in the militaries of most nations. The rank directly above is kapitan (kpt.), which is equivalent to captain. A Polish officer with the rank of lieutenant wears three stars on their shoulder straps.

Currently, in the Polish Army, commissioned officers with the rank of porucznik mainly serve as heads and officers of battalion and squadron staff sections. They also commonly serve as deputy company and battery commanders.

The rank of lieutenant is also present in the Border Guard, Prison Service, Foreign Intelligence Agency, Military Intelligence Servce, Military Counterintelligence Service, and Internal Security Agency. The equivalent of this rank in the police is a commissioner, in the State Fire Service - a captain, and in the Tax and Customs Service - a customs commissioner.

== Etymology ==
"Porucznik" is derived from the verb "poruczać" that occurs in Old Polish, that is, "to put into one's hands with confidence, to entrust", which in turn is derived from the word "hand". Originally, the word "porucznik" had a more general meaning.
