= Olszany, Świdnica County =

Olszany
- Village
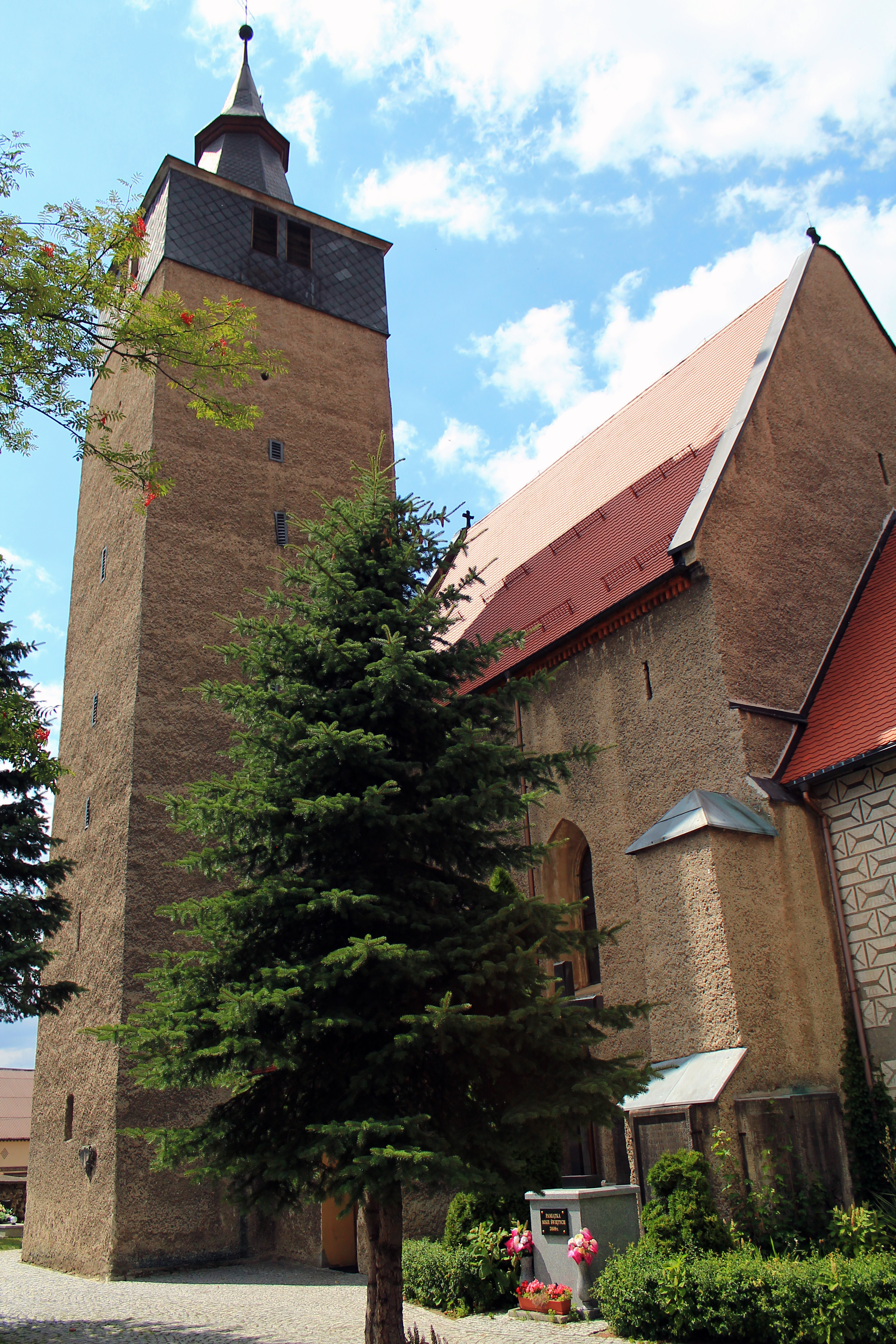
- Church of Holy Trinity

- Location within Poland
- Coordinates: 50°55′N 16°21′E
- Country: Poland
- Voivodeship: Lower Silesian
- County: Świdnica
- Gmina: Strzegom

Population
  - Total: 970

Olszany [ɔlˈʂanɨ] is a village in the administrative district of Gmina Strzegom, within Świdnica County, Lower Silesian Voivodeship, in south-western Poland.
