= August 1926 =

Month of 1926

<<	August 1926					>>
Su	Mo	Tu	We	Th	Fr	Sa
1	2	3	4	5	6	7
8	9	10	11	12	13	14
15	16	17	18	19	20	21
22	23	24	25	26	27	28
29	30	31

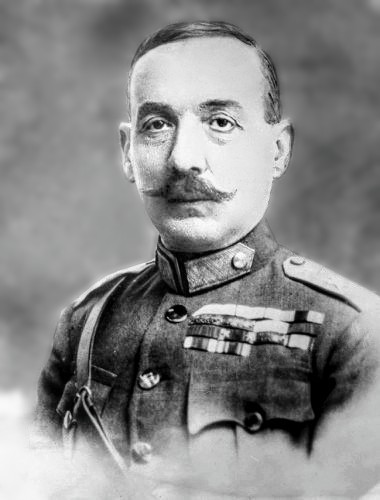
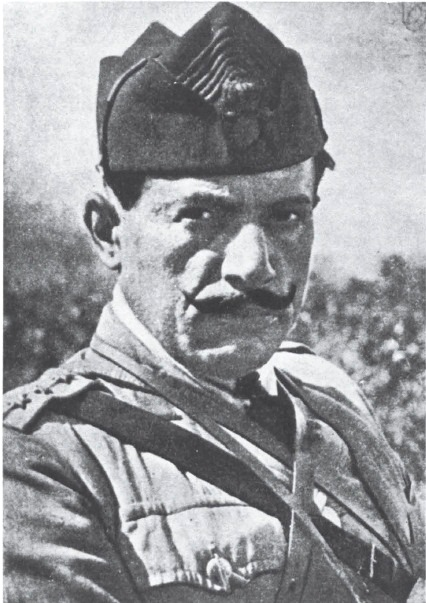
August 22, 1926: The dictatorship of Greece's General Theodoros Pangalos is ended by General Georgios Kondylis.

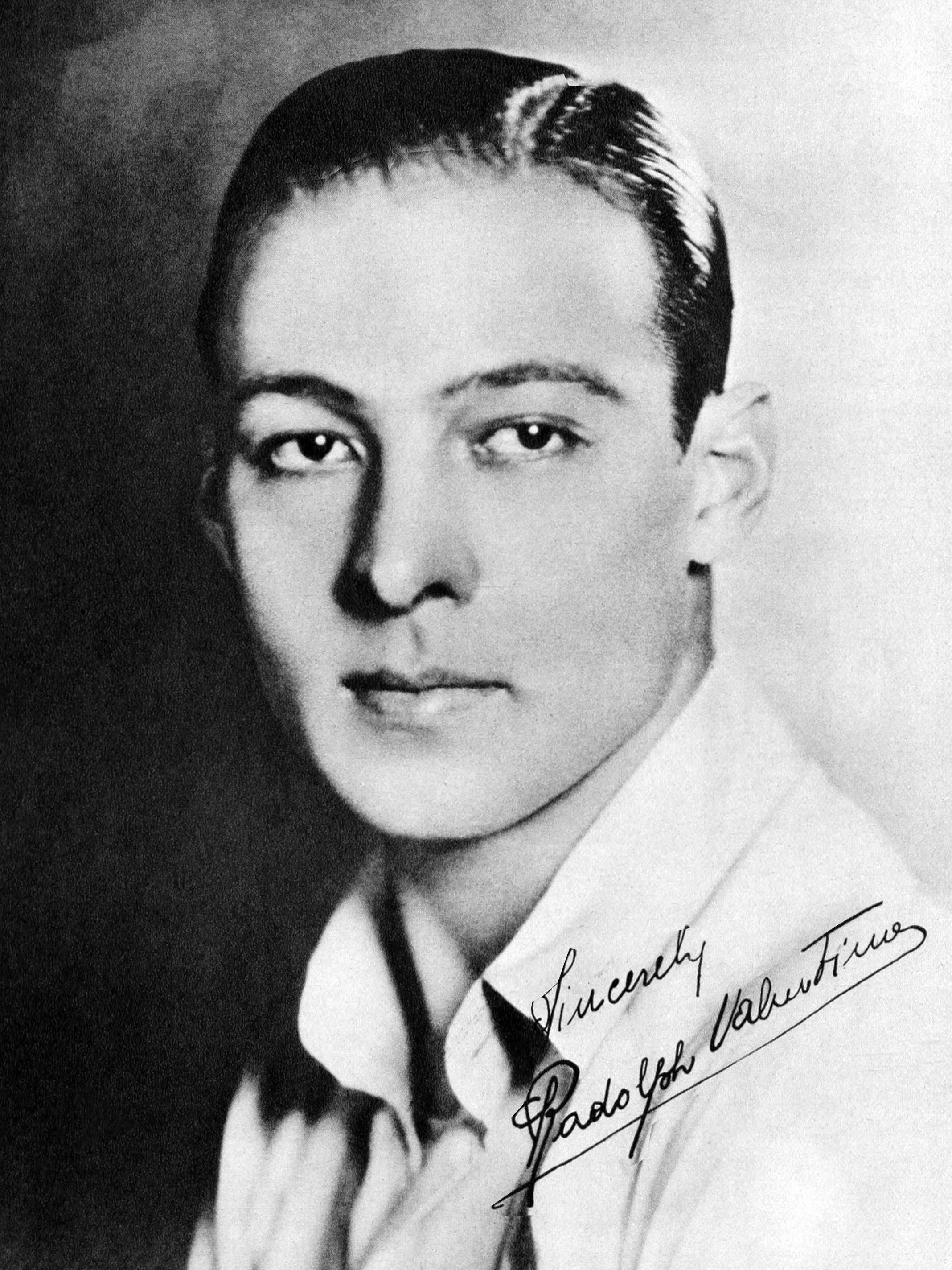
August 23, 1926: U.S. film idol Rudolph Valentino dies after appendectomy

The following events occurred in August 1926:

== August 1, 1926 (Sunday) ==
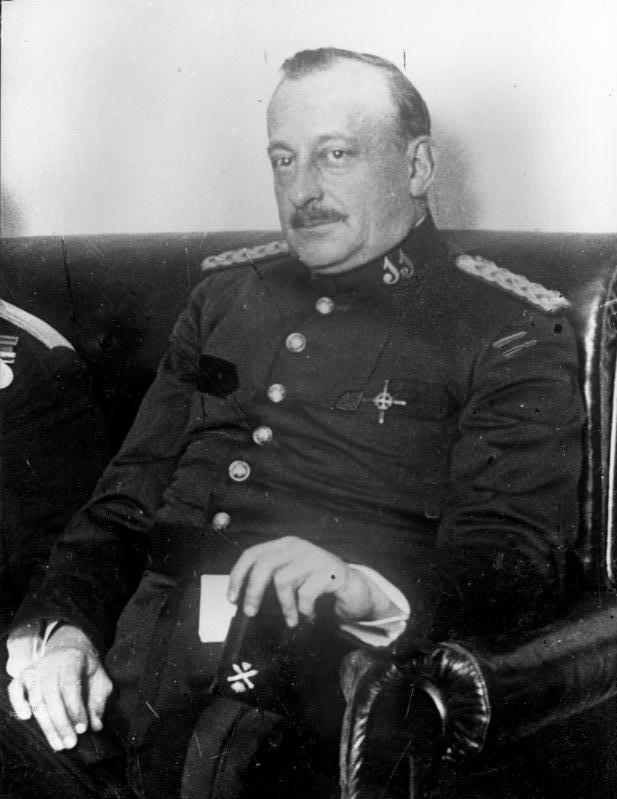
Primo de Rivera

- An assassination attempt against Spanish dictator Miguel Primo de Rivera failed in Barcelona when a thrown dagger narrowly missed his head as he rode in a car. A 34-year-old Catalan anarchist was arrested.
- In Italy's Northern League (Lega Nord) of soccer football, Juventus FC (17–3–2) of Group B defeated Bologna FC 1909 (17–4–1) of Group A, 2 goals to 1, after the teams had played to a 2–2 draw and a 0–0 draw in their two-game series. Juventus then played against SS Alba Roma, championship of the Southern League (Lega Sud) and overwhelmed them by a margin of 17 goals.
- Born: Hannah Hauxwell, British farmer and television personality; in Baldersdale, North Riding of Yorkshire (d. 2018)
- Died:
  - Israel Zangwill, 62, British Zionist, novelist and playwright
  - Fanindra Bose, 38, India-born Scottish sculptor, died of a heart attack while fishing and drowned.

== August 2, 1926 (Monday) ==
- Amendments to the 1921 constitution of Poland took effect to give President Józef Piłsudski increased powers and to minimize those of the nation's bicameral parliament. The provisions of the August Novelization (Nowela sierpniowa) provided that the president could dismiss the Sejm and the Senat at any time, though the Sejm could not vote for its own dissolution, and that President Pilsudski's decrees (rozporzadzenia), including a state budget, would have the effect of a statute unless rejected by the parliament.
- The Turkish freighter S.S. Bozkourt was torn apart when it was struck by the French passenger ship S.S. Lotus, and eight passengers drowned. After the Lotus rescued the 10 survivors and transported them to Istanbul, the captain, Mr. Demons, was arrested by Turkish authorities and charged with liability for the deaths and the damage caused by the accident, giving rise to the "Lotus case", when the World Court of the League of Nations made a determination of whether Turkey or France had jurisdiction over a crime committed in international waters, with a ruling in 1927 that would lead to the Convention of the High Seas in 1958.
- Italy enacted new austerity measures to fight poverty and redress the country's trade deficit. Pastry containing pure white flour was prohibited.
- Born:
  - Sy Mah, Canadian long-distance runner who achieved the world record of most marathons, with 524 from 1967 to 1988 ; in Bashaw, Alberta (died from leukemia, 1988)
  - Igor Spassky, Soviet Russian engineer who oversaw the design of almost 200 submarines for the Soviet Navy and the Russian Navy; in Bogorodsk (d. 2024)
  - Annie Geeraerts, Belgian television actress known for portraying "Bomma" in the soap opera Familie since its debut in 1991; in Borgerhout, Flanders (alive in 2026)
  - Hugh Maguire, Irish violinist and leader of the BBC Symphony Orchestra and the London Symphony Orchestra; in Dublin (d. 2013)
  - Uday Bhanu Hans, Indian Hindi language poet and poet laureate of the state of Haryana; in Daira Din Panah, Punjab Province, British India (now in Pakistan) (d. 2019)

== August 3, 1926 (Tuesday) ==
- The Cristero War, an uprising by the LNDLR (Liga Nacional Defensora de la Libertad Religiosa, nicknamed Los Cristeros), began as a peasant uprising against the Calles government.
- Some 400 armed Catholics barricaded themselves in the Church of Our Lady of Guadalupe in Guadalajara, Jalisco, Mexico and exchanged gunfire with federal troops until they ran out of ammunition and surrendered. According to U.S. consular sources, 18 people were killed and 40 wounded.
- Italy banned any parades, ceremonies and public demonstrations that were not authorized as "effectively useful".
- The Mount Batur volcano on the island of Bali in the Dutch East Indies (now Indonesia) erupted for the first time since 1917, and destroyed the village of Karang Anyar, but the residents were able to evacuate safely. The Pura Ulun temple, completed earlier in the year, was spared, although the lava stopped at the temple gates.
- London's first traffic lights came into operation at 11:25 in the morning at Piccadilly Circus. The eight signalling lights supplemented the existing group of traffic policemen in guiding drivers. According to London's Evening Express, "hundreds of people watched the red and green flickers in Piccadilly which told a dozen policemen when to raise and drop their arms."
- The grand jury in the Aimee Semple McPherson case reconvened to consider further testimony and evidence.
- Born:
  - Tony Bennett, American singer known for his signature song I Left My Heart in San Francisco, winner of 20 Grammy Awards; as Anthony Benedetto in Astoria, Queens, New York (d. 2023)
  - Shun-ichi Iwasaki, Japanese engineer known for his pioneering work on perpendicular magnetic recording, which has been integral to the development of the modern hard disk drive; in Koriyama, Fukushima prefecture (d. 2025)
  - Anthony Sampson, British novelist known for Anatomy of Britain and its five sequels; in Billingham, County Durham (d. 2004)
  - George Ford, American book illustrator; in Brooklyn, New York City (alive in 2026)
  - Mary E. Rice, American inverterbrate biologist; in Washington, D.C. (d. 2021)
- Died:
  - Vasil Kovachev, 60, Bulgarian zoologist and botanist
  - Ernest Willows, 40, Welsh aviator, airship builder and pilot, was killed in an accident along with four other people while taking the group aloft in a balloon. The netting holding the basket to the rest of the balloon came loose and Willows and his passengers fell 60 feet (18 m) to their deaths.

== August 4, 1926 (Wednesday) ==
- Sultan bin Zayed bin Khalifa Al Nahyan, ruler of the Emirate of Abu Dhabi (now part of the United Arab Emirates), was killed by his half-brother, Saqr bin Zayed Al Nahyan, in a coup d'état. Sultan bin Zayed and Saqr bin Zayed had teamed up in 1922 to kill their own brother, the Emir Hamdan bin Zeyed.
- Umberto Nobile was feted in Rome for his part in the recent North Pole expedition, as 20,000 filled the square in front of the Palazzo Chigi. Sharing the balcony with Nobile and his team Mussolini declared, "In vain did others try to steal the glory of Major General Nobile and to change the proportion of credit for events without parallel in human history. But I want to say in a voice of thunder that, Italy, it was you who were responsible for the glory, and it was you who pushed and helped him to his objective."

== August 5, 1926 (Thursday) ==
Will H. Hays introducing Vitaphone

- The four-minute film Introduction of Vitaphone Sound Pictures introduced Warner Brothers' new sound-on-film process, Vitaphone, at the Warner Theatre in New York City. In the short feature, Will H. Hays, President of the Motion Picture Producers and Distributors of America, whose voice was synchronized to the moving picture, told the audience "Now, neither the artist nor his art will ever wholly die." Afterward, Don Juan, became the first full-length movie to include the Vitaphone process. Starring John Barrymore, Don Juan had no dialogue, it did have synchronized sound effects and a musical soundtrack.
- Less than three months before his death, American magician and escape artist Harry Houdini performed one of his most spectacular stunts, laying down in a coffin which was then sealed, lowered into a swimming pool at the Hotel Shelton in New York City, and not being brought out until more than 90 minutes later. Unable to leave the container without being noticed by the spectators, and with no visible source of outside oxygen, Houdini used controlled breathing to remain conscious for "exactly 1 hour, 31 minutes and 31 seconds" from 12:09 to 1:40 in the afternoon. Houdini's stunt had been preceded by a similar stunt where an Egyptian Hindu magician, Rahman Bey, had stayed in a casket for one hour.
- France and Germany signed a trade accord covering the full range of trade between the two nations.
- English pilot Alan Cobham arrived in Port Darwin, Australia to complete the first half of his round-trip flight between England and Australia.
- Born:
  - Betsy Jolas, French-born American opera and orchestral composer; in Paris (alive in 2026)
  - Doug McClelland, President of the Australian Senate from 1983 to 1987, and Australian High Commissioner to the United Kingdom, 1987 to 1991; in Wentworthville, New South Wales (alive in 2026)

== August 6, 1926 (Friday) ==
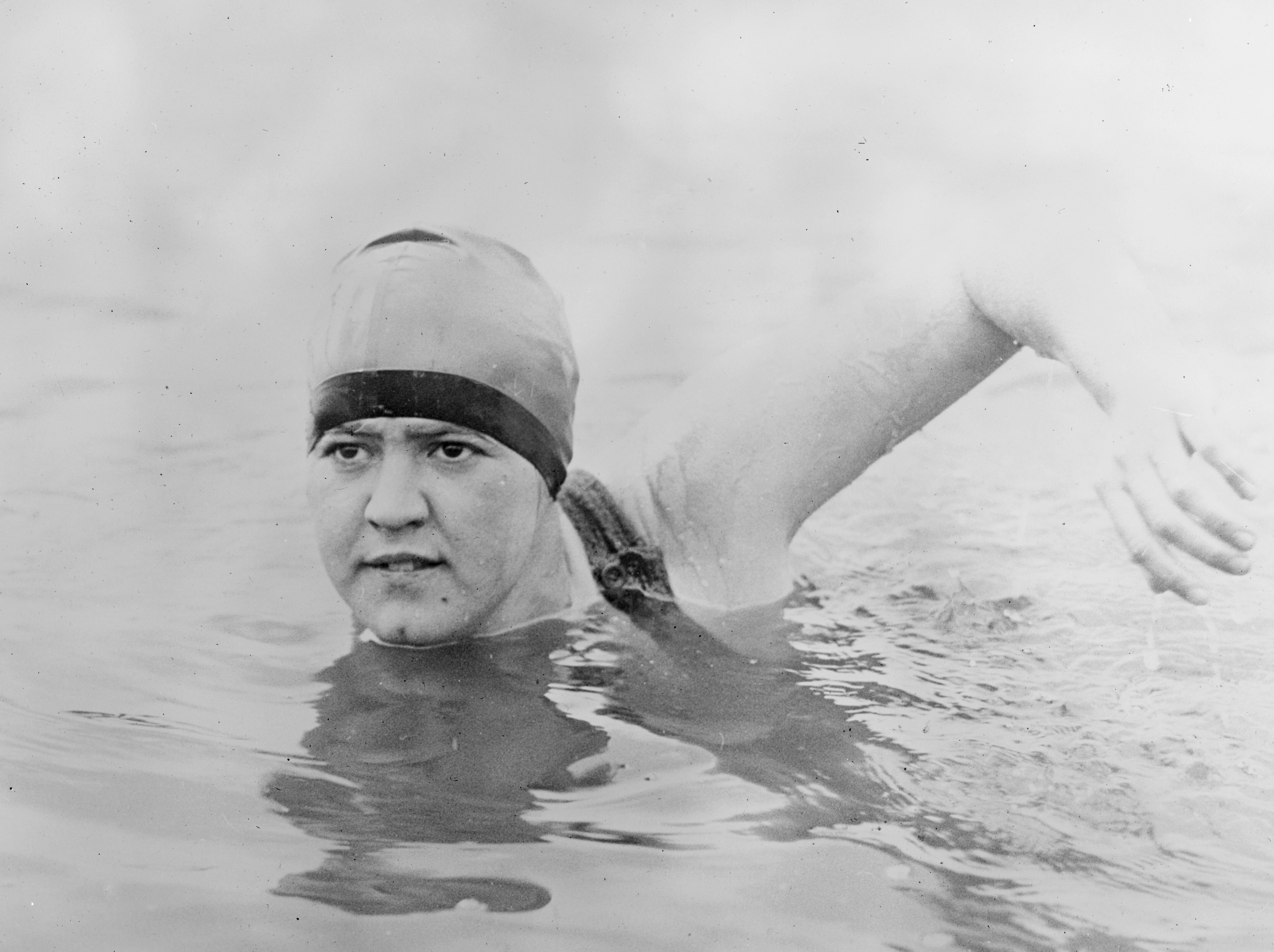
Ederle

- Gertrude Ederle became the first woman to swim across the English Channel, and the sixth person overall. Covering the 20.9 miles (33.6 km) distance from Cap Gris-Nez in France to Kingsdown in England in 14 hours and 39 minutes, Ederle broke the record for any person, woman or man, besting the record of 16 hours, 33 minutes that had been set by Enrique Tirabocchi on August 12, 1923.
- The appareil Fernez-Le Prieur, the first self-contained underwater breathing apparatus, was given its inaugural public demonstration by inventors Maurice Fernez and Yves Le Prieur. The system used an air tank to be worn on the swimmer's back, a hose that led to a mouthpiece with a one-way valve (created by Fernez) and a pressure regulator (designed by Le Prieur) that could be controlled by the swimmer. The event took place at the Piscine des Tourelles, the swimming pool used at the 1924 Summer Olympics in Paris.
- The Japanese broadcasting network NHK (Nippon Hoso Kyoka) was created by the merger of the radio stations of Tokyo, Osaka and Nagoya.
- The shipping company United American Lines, founded by W. Averell Harriman and operating with a fleet of six ships, was acquired by Germany's Hamburg America Line
- Born:
  - Norman Wexler, American screenwriter; in New Bedford, Massachusetts (d. 1999)
  - J. A. Baker, English author known for The Peregrine (1967); in Chelmsford, Essex (d. 1987)
  - Francesco Somaini, Italian sculptor; in Lomazzo (d. 2005)
- Died: Paolina Schiff, 85, German-born Italian women's rights pioneer.

== August 7, 1926 (Saturday) ==
- Mexican President Plutarco Elías Calles ruled out foreign mediation in the battle between the government and the Catholic church.
- The governments of Spain, led by the dictator Miguel Primo de Rivera, and Italy, led by dictator Benito Mussolini, signed a Treaty of Friendship.
- Miguel Abadía Méndez was inaugurated to a four-year term as President of Colombia, succeeding fellow Conservative Pedro Nel Ospina Vázquez after having been elected unopposed on February 14 during the period of the "Conservative Hegemony".
- The first British Grand Prix was held at the Brooklands motor racing circuit in England, near Weybridge, Surrey, and was won by Louis Wagner of France, who had taken over from Robert Sénéchal in driving the 110 laps in Senechal's Delage 15-S-8 car. Malcolm Campbell of Britain, who had passed France's André Dubonnet on lap 102 in his Bugatti 39A, finished in second place.
- The Marx Brothers' musical The Cocoanuts ended its Broadway run after 276 performances.
- Born:
  - Stan Freberg, American comedian, satirist, actor, and advertising director; in Pasadena, California (d. 2015)
  - Arthur C. McGill, Canadian-born American theologian; in Wolfville, Nova Scotia (d. 1980)

== August 8, 1926 (Sunday) ==
- Former French Prime Minister Georges Clemenceau weighed in on the Mellon–Berenger Agreement by publishing an open letter addressed to U.S. President Calvin Coolidge. Excerpts from the letter read, "You are claiming from us payment not of a debt of commerce but of war. You know, as we do, that our treasury is empty ... We are debtors, you are creditors. It seems this is regarded as purely a matter for the cashier's department, but are there no other considerations to be taken into account? ... Come to our villages and read the endless list of their dead and make comparisons, if you will. Was this not a 'bank account?' The loss of this vital force of youth? ... How is it we failed to foresee what is now happening? Why did we not halt under the shells and convoke a board meeting of profiteers to decide the question whether it would allow us to continue in defense of the finest conquest in the finest of histories?"
- In the first game of the two-game series between the champions of Italy's northern and southern soccer football leagues, Juventus defeated Alba Roma, 12 goals to 1, meaning that Alba Roma would have to score 11 goals more than Juventus in the second game for the best aggregate score.
- Born: Maulwi Saelan, captain of the Indonesian national soccer football team in the 1956 Summer Olympics (with 30 caps between 1956 and 19611), and Chairman of the Football Association of Indonesia from 1964 to 1967; in Makassar, Dutch East Indies (d. 2016)

== August 9, 1926 (Monday) ==
- The Royal Navy submarine HMS H29 sank during sea trials after a refitting, killing five civilians and one crewman.
- Agriculturalist Alfred Daniel Hall told the British Association for the Advancement of Science that in the future, humanity would be forced to become vegetarian due to a global wheat famine.

== August 10, 1926 (Tuesday) ==
- A hurricane struck Nova Scotia province in Canada and capsized two fishing boats, killing all 26 crew of the schooner Sylvia Mosher at Halifax, and 22 men on the British schooner Sadie A. Knickle were killed when the boat foundered off of the coast of Sable Island.
- In Mexico, 20 people were executed by federal firing squad over the church riots.
- Born:
  - Marie-Claire Alain, French classical organist and recording artist; in Saint-Germain-en-Laye, Yvelines département (d.2013)
  - Carol Karp, American mathematician and specialist in infinitary logic; in Forest Grove, Michigan (died from cancer, 1972)
  - Sam Mattingly, American inventor and entrepreneur, co-creator (with Harry Loats) of the neutral buoyancy simulator for astronaut training; in Baltimore (d. 2014)

== August 11, 1926 (Wednesday) ==
- Yugoslavia, Romania and Greece sent a collective note to Bulgaria demanding that cross-border raids by Macedonian irregulars cease.
- In Berlin, 50 were injured in nighttime rioting between communists and republicans on Republic Day (a special day observed during the Weimar Republic commemorating its founding in 1919).
- Eastman Kodak said it was working on color motion picture film.
- Richard Reese Whittemore, leader of the Whittemore Gang, was hanged.
- Born:
  - Aaron Klug, Lithuanian-born British biochemist and 1982 Nobel Prize laureate for his development of crystallographic electron microscopy and his structural elucidation of biologically important nucleic acid-protein complexes; in Želva (d. 2018)
  - Claus von Bülow, Denmark-born British socialite who had been put on trial for charges of the attempted murder of his wife; in Copenhagen (d. 2019)
  - Ekkirala Krishnamacharya, Indian spiritual leader, homeopath and philanthropist, known as "EK"; in Bapatla, Madras Presidency, British India (now in Andhra Pradesh) (d. 1984)
  - Bernard Ashley, British businessman and co-founder, with his wife, of the Laura Ashley fashion retailer; in Brixton, London (d. 2009)
  - Sherman K. Stein, American mathematician and author of mathematics textbooks; in Minneapolis (alive in 2026)
- Died:
  - Dr. Jamini Bhushan Ray, 47, Indian physician and philanthropist
  - U.S. Army First Lieutenant Eugene Barksdale, 29, American test pilot, was killed after bailing out of a Douglas O-2 observation aircraft. Barksdale's parachute was caught in the bracing wires of the airplane and he went down with the craft as it crashed. The Barksdale Air Force Base in Louisiana would be named in his honor in 1933.

== August 12, 1926 (Thursday) ==
- A munitions factory exploded on Csepel Island in Hungary, killing 24 people and injuring 250.
- In the state of Western Australia in Australia, Anglican missionary Ernest Gribble and Inspector E. C. Mitchell of the state's Aborigines Department became the first investigators to find evidence of the Forrest River massacre of at least 15 indigenous Aboriginal people from June 5 to June 27.
- The John Galsworthy play Escape was performed for the first time, making its debut at the Ambassadors Theatre on London's West End and produced by Leon M. Lion (who also had an acting role in the production) and featuring Nicholas Hannen in the lead role.
- Born:
  - John Derek (stage name for Derek Harris), American actor, director and photographer, in Hollywood, California (d. 1998)
  - Hiroshi Koizumi, Japanese actor who starred in Godzilla Raids Again and other Toho Studios , in Kamakura City(d. 2015)
  - Wallace Markfield, American novelist best known for To an Early Grave (1964); in Brooklyn, New York (d. 2002)
  - Douglas Croft (stage name for Douglas Wheatrcroft), American actor who was the first to portray the character of "Robin" on the screen, appearing in the Batman movie serial in 1943; in Seattle (d. 1963 from acute alcohol intoxication)

== August 13, 1926 (Friday) ==
- Lou Gehrig hit two home runs off of fellow baseball legend Walter Johnson in the same game. Jack Fournier in 1914 was the only other player to ever do so.
- Born: Fidel Castro, Cuban revolutionary who served as Prime Minister from 1959 to 1976 and President from 1976 to 2008; in Birán (d. 2016).

== August 14, 1926 (Saturday) ==
- The Soviet Union made a claim to ownership of Wrangel Island above the North Pole and asserted its sovereignty with the founding of the settlement of Ushakovskoye by an expedition led by Georgy Ushakov.
- Mexican government agents, carrying out a purge of Roman Catholic clerics, arrived at the town Chalchihuites in the Zacatecas state, and arrested Father Luis Bátiz Sainz at a private house. Batiz and three other Catholic activists were executed the next day.
- Born:
  - René Goscinny, French comic book writer known for creating the Asterix comic series; in Paris (died from a heart attack, 1977)
  - Margot Benacerraf, Venezuelan documentary film director; in Caracas, known for her films Reverón (1952) and Araya (1959) (d. 2024)
- Died: John H. Moffitt, 83, U.S. Representative for New York from 1887 to 1891 and Medal of Honor recipient for heroism in the American Civil War

== August 15, 1926 (Sunday) ==
- Film actor Rudolph Valentino fell critically ill, collapsing at the Hotel Ambassador in New York City. He was rushed to hospital and operated on immediately for a ruptured appendix.
- Father Luis Bátiz Sainz and three members of the Mexican Association for Catholic Youth— Manuel Morales, David Roldán Lara, and Salvador Lara Puente— were executed by firing squad. (Other sources state that the day of the execution was July 27.) The killing caused a band of ranchers led by former colonel Pedro Quintanar to seize the municipal treasury of Chalchihuites and to declare themselves in open rebellion. All four of the martyrs would be canonized as saints of the Roman Catholic Church in 2000.
- In an unusual baseball game between the Brooklyn Robins and the visiting Boston Braves, three of the Dodgers players ended up at third base at the same time. With the bases loaded, Babe Herman hit a double and tried to run from second base to third. Chick Fewster, who had been on first base, was attempting to reach third on the double, and Dazzy Vance, who had been on second, rounded third was trying to run to home when he was caught in a rundown between home and third. Vance, Fewster and Herman all ended up at third base and Braves' third baseman Eddie Taylor tagged all three out. Despite the error, Brooklyn won the game, 4 to 1.
- Born:
  - Konstantinos Stephanopoulos, President of Greece from 1995 to 2005; in Patras (d. 2016)
  - Ilya Sobol, Lithuanian-born Russian mathematician known for variance-based sensitivity analysis (the "Sobol indices") and for the Sobol sequence; in Panevėžys, Republic of Lithuania (d. 2025)
  - Sir Kenneth Newman, British law enforcement officer who served as Chief Constable of the Royal Ulster Constabulary in Northern Ireland from 1976 to 1980, and Commissioner of the London Metropolitan Police from 1982 to 1987; in Hackney, London (d. 2017)
- Died:
  - Dr. John Hall-Edwards, 67, British physician who, in 1896, made the first x-ray of a patient in the British Isles
  - Raymond Byrd, 31, African-American farmhand and World War One veteran, was lynched by a mob after being kidnapped from the jail in Wytheville, Virginia, after being arrested for rape.

== August 16, 1926 (Monday) ==
- A coffin brought from Norway to London thought to contain the remains of Lord Kitchener was opened by the coroner in the presence of police, but it contained no body. The scenario was the work of a hoaxer going by the name of Frank Power.

== August 17, 1926 (Tuesday) ==
- The Kingdom of Greece and the Kingdom of Serbs, Croats and Slovenes (later Yugoslavia) reached an agreement to permit the Balkan kingdom to use the port at Thessaloniki.
- Judge Charles Merrill Hough of the United States Court of Appeals for the Second Circuit ruled that all visitors to the United States except Canadians required a visa to enter the country.
- Born: Jiang Zemin, General Secretary of the Chinese Communist Party from 1989 to 2002 and President of the People's Republic of China from 1993 to 2003; in Yangzhou, Jiangsu province, Republic of China (d. 2022)

== August 18, 1926 (Wednesday) ==
- At a speech in Pesaro, Italian Premier Benito Mussolini announced "Quota 90", a controversial revaluation of the Italian lira from 19 lira per U.S. dollar to 30 per dollar.
- An Air Union airliner with 15 people aboard crashed while making an emergency landing while on a scheduled flight from Paris to London, seriously injuring everyone on board, with two passengers and the pilot, a Mr. Delisle, dying. The four-engine Blériot 155 aircraft, designated the Wilbur Wright, departed from Le Bourget Airport with a scheduled destination of Croydon Airport for a three and a half hour flight, and had crossed the English Channel when it experienced engine trouble. While descending to reach a field on a farm outside of Aldington, Kent, the Bleriot 155 clipped the roof of a barn and struck the ground.
- The International Society for the History of Pharmacy (ISHP) was founded as the Gesellschaft für Geschichte der Pharmazie by five pharmacists meeting in Innsbruck in Austria, and would continue to promote research, teaching and publication of pharmaceutical history 100 years later as a group of 29 national societies.
- The New York Polyclinic Hospital issued a bulletin describing the condition of Rudolph Valentino as "favorable" after receiving multiple phone calls while rumors of the film idol's death circulated.
- Born: Orlando Bosch, Cuban anti-Castro militant and exile who led the terrorist group Coordination of United Revolutionary Organizations (CORU); in Potrerillo (d. 2011)
- Died: Grace Neill, 80, New Zealand nurse and lobbyist whose lobbying led to New Zealand becoming the first nation to require training and national registration of nurses and midwives

== August 19, 1926 (Thursday) ==
- British coal miners reopened negotiations with the government to resolve the ongoing lockout.
- Rudolph Valentino's condition greatly improved. He answered a list of questions from the media and issued a statement thanking his fans and well-wishers for their messages of encouragement.
- Born:
  - Arthur Rock, American businessman and pioneer of venture capitalism, particularly in the information industry, in Rochester, New York (alive in 2026)
  - Ann Elizabeth Wee, British-born Singaporean pioneer in social work in the nation of Singapore; in Corbridge, Northumberland (d. 2019)

== August 20, 1926 (Friday) ==
- The Communist Party of Germany excluded Ruth Fischer, Arkadi Maslow, and three other members for asserting that the Soviet Union was no longer a true Communist state.
- Born: Eduard Yelyan, Soviet Air Force officer and test pilot; in Baku, Azerbaijan SSR, Soviet Union (d. 2009)
- Died:
  - Stanley Weir, 69, Canadian judge and poet known for writing the English lyrics to the national anthem of Canada, "O Canada"
  - Billy Trew, 47, Welsh rugby union centre with 29 caps for the Wales national team from 1900 to 1913
  - Charles Barr, 23, American serial killer nicknamed "the Petting Party Bandit", was executed in the electric chair.

== August 21, 1926 (Saturday) ==
- Marshal Józef Piłsudski conducted a purge of the Polish military to remove any challenges to his authority.
- Motorcyclist Curley Fredericks made the fastest run ever on a board track by racing at 120.3 miles per hour (193.6 km/h) to travel 1.25 miles (2.01 km) in 37.4 seconds at the Rockingham Park board racing track in Salem, New Hampshire breaking a record for any track at the time. The record for board track racing still stands almost 100 years later, in part because cycle races are no longer performed on board tracks.
- Convalescing from an emergency appendectomy, Rudolph Valentino was stricken with a severe relapse of pleuritis, at the time untreatable, in his left lung.
- Born:
  - Jaymala Shiledar, Indian classical singer, theater actress and composer; as Pramila Jadhav in Indore, Central India Agency (now in Madhya Pradesh), British India (d. 2013)
  - Brian Bonsor, Scottish-born composer and music teacher specializing in the recorder; in Hawick, Roxburghshire (d. 2011)
  - Robert Robbins, Australian illusionist and stage magician; in Sydney (died from heart disease, 1964)
- Died:
  - Louise Vanderbilt, 71, American socialite and philanthropist from "complications setting in from a slight throat infection".
  - Stuart P. Sherman, 44, American literary critic known for his feud with H. L. Mencken, drowned in Lake Michigan when the canoe he was paddling overturned.
  - Sunstar, 18, British thoroughbred racehorse and winner of the 1911 Epsom Derby and sire of multiple champion horses

== August 22, 1926 (Sunday) ==
- Greek dictator Theodoros Pangalos was overthrown in a bloodless coup led by General Georgios Kondylis, who was "supported by the army, the navy and the provincial garrisons" who occupied public buildings, arrested Pangalos at Spetsae, and placed him on the Greek Navy destroyer Pergamos, whose captain then tried to help Pangalos escape. Another destroyer, Leon, pursued and, after exchanging fire with Pergamos, forced its surrender and captured General Pangalos.
- On the Dimanche sanglant de Colmar ("Bloody Sunday of Colmar") violent clashes took place in France in the city of Colmar as members of the Alsatian minority group Heimatbund and the right-wing French nationalist Camelots du Roi group. Although there were no fatalities, more than 60 people were injured.
- The Vagard sheriff's murders took place in the village of Vagard, near Hønefoss in the Buskerud county of Norway when two deputies, John Solumsmoen and Oluf Aalde, were shot and killed by two robbers, Anton Svensson and Henning Madsen, who were attempting to break open a safe. The incident would be the subject of the 1933 novel To mistenkelige personer ("Two Suspicious Persons" or "Two Suspects") by Gunnar Larsen, and a film of the same name, made in 1950. The film would have been banned from public showing for 48 years until being shown on November 25, 1998, more than 70 years after the crime.
- Juventus FC won the national soccer football championship of Italy, defeating SS Alba Roma 7 to 1 in the second of the two-game series, with an aggregate score of 19 to 2.
- Born:
  - William C. Davis, American food chemist known for discovering the additive arabinogalactan and creating the popular instant mashed potatoes, as well as co-developing Dasani bottled water and improving the quality of snack foods; in Waycross, Georgia (d. 2022)
  - Gerald S. Lesser, American psychologist and Harvard University professor who advised on the development of the TV program Sesame Street and other Children's Television Workshop programs; in Queens, New York City (d. 2010)
- Died: Charles W. Eliot, 92, President of Harvard University from 1869 to 1909

== August 23, 1926 (Monday) ==
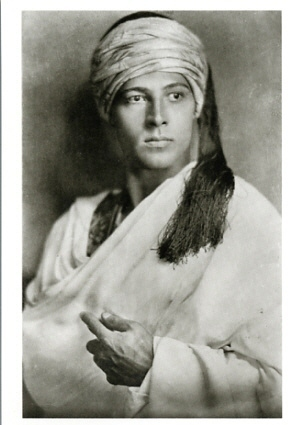
Valentino in The Sheik

- Rudolph Valentino, 31, the popular Italian film actor and idol, died at 12:10 in the afternoon at New York's Polyclinic Hospital, from complications associated with a double operation on August 15 for appendicitis and for a perforated ulcer. His last word before falling into a coma had been 'Madre'. The New York Times reported that "his last rational words" had been in a conversation with the Chairman of United Artists, who reported that Valenino said, "Don't worry, Chief. I'll be all right."
- General Kondylis proclaimed himself the new Prime Minister of Greece and announced that he would form a coalition cabinet. as the Greek Navy destroyer Leon brought General Pangalos and two of the former dictator's aides back to Athens to face trial.
- Molla Mallory defeated Elizabeth Ryan to win her 8th and final American tennis championship as she won the tiebreaking set in the U.S. Open at Forest Hills, New York. Mallory, who had won consecutive U.S. Open titles (1915, 1916, 1917, 1918, and 1920, 1921, 1922), lost the first set, 4–6, then captured the second, 6–4 to force a third set. Mallory lost the first four games of the final set before tying the set and won, 9 games to 7 to capture the title.
- Born: Clifford Geertz, American cultural anthropologist; in San Francisco (d. 2006)
- Died:
  - Carl Aller, 80, Danish magazine publisher who founded what is now Aller Media with the 1877 launch of the Illustreret Familie Journalen (Illustrated Family Journal)
  - Bert M. Fernald, 68, U.S. Senator for Maine since 1916

== August 24, 1926 (Tuesday) ==
- The Australian Baptist Ministries (now the Australian Baptist Union) was inaugurated at the Burton Street Church in Sydney.
- Admiral Pavlos Kountouriotis, who had resigned in April in protest of the dictatorship of General Pangalos, accepted a vote of the Greek parliament to return to office, and announced that he would resume his duties as President of Greece.

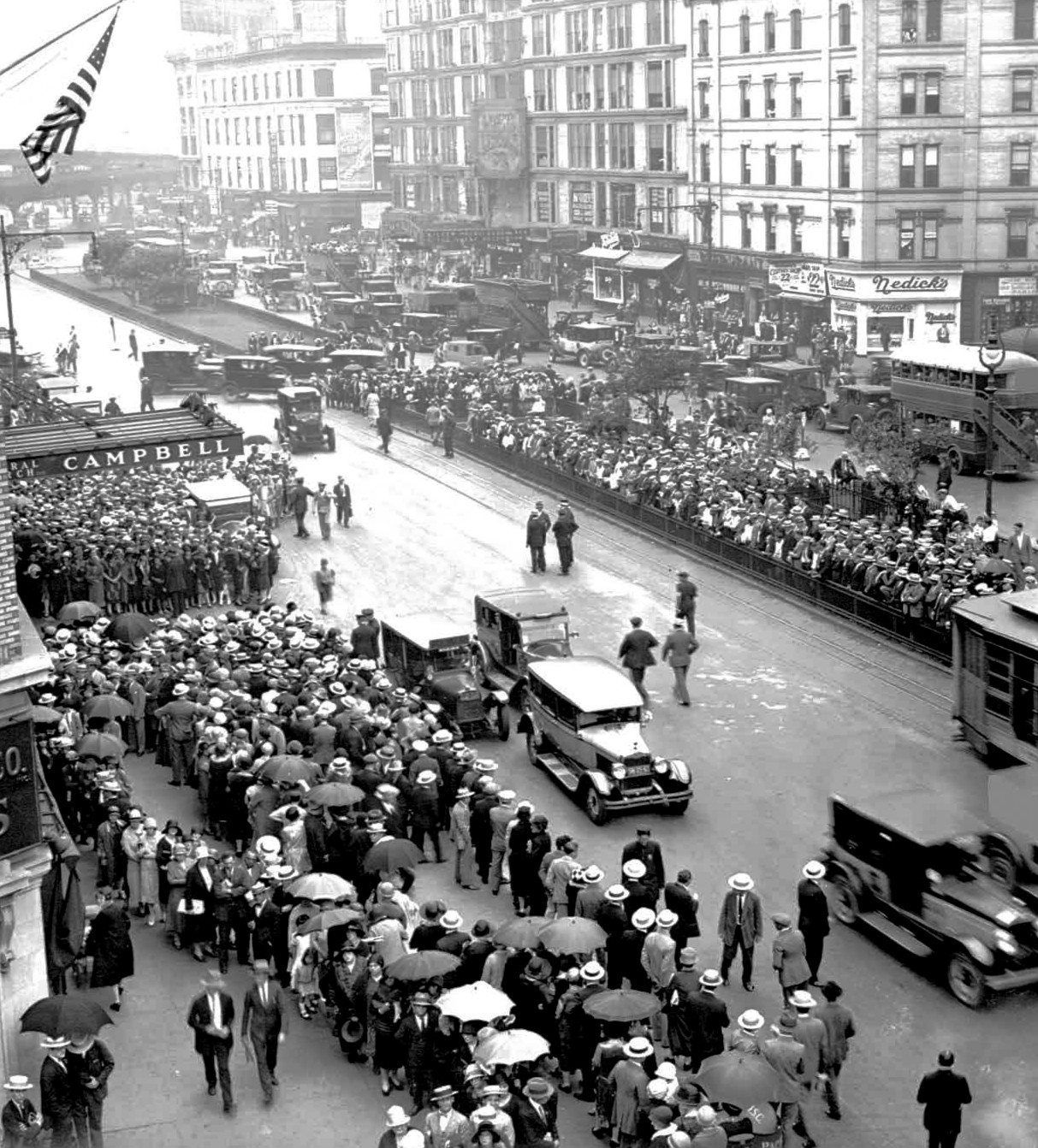
Valentino's funeral procession in New York

- One hundred people were injured as a riot nearly ensued in New York when 60,000 mourners, mostly women, pushed through Campbell's Funeral Parlor to get a glimpse of Rudolph Valentino's body lying in state.
- FC Barcelona Bàsquet (FCB), now a professional basketball team with two titles in the EuroLeague (2003 and 2010), the 1985 FIBA Intercontinental Cup championship, 20 Spanish League titles and 27 Spanish Cup wins, was founded in Spain.
- Reverend Gilbert A. Eakins, 27, of Saratoga, Wyoming, was fatally burned when he fell into hot springs at Yellowstone National Park. Eakins had been walking in the dark through the park when he fell in and was scalded.

== August 25, 1926 (Wednesday) ==
- A Category 3 hurricane killed 26 people as it made landfall in the U.S. at Houma, Louisiana.
- The Great White Train", sponsored by the Australia Made Preference League to exhibit and promote items manufactured in the state of New South Wales, began its second statewide tour, after having adjourned its first tour on May 20. The new tour started from Newcastle on the first of 41 stops, ending on November 22 at the Sydney suburb of Hurstville.
- After a second chaotic day of public viewing of Rudolph Valentino's body, it was announced that Campbell's Funeral Parlor was moving the body to a vault until Monday's funeral and that public viewing was closed. Valentino's manager George Ullman explained, "The lack of reverence shown by the crowd, the disorder and attendant rioting since the body was first shown has forced me to this decision."

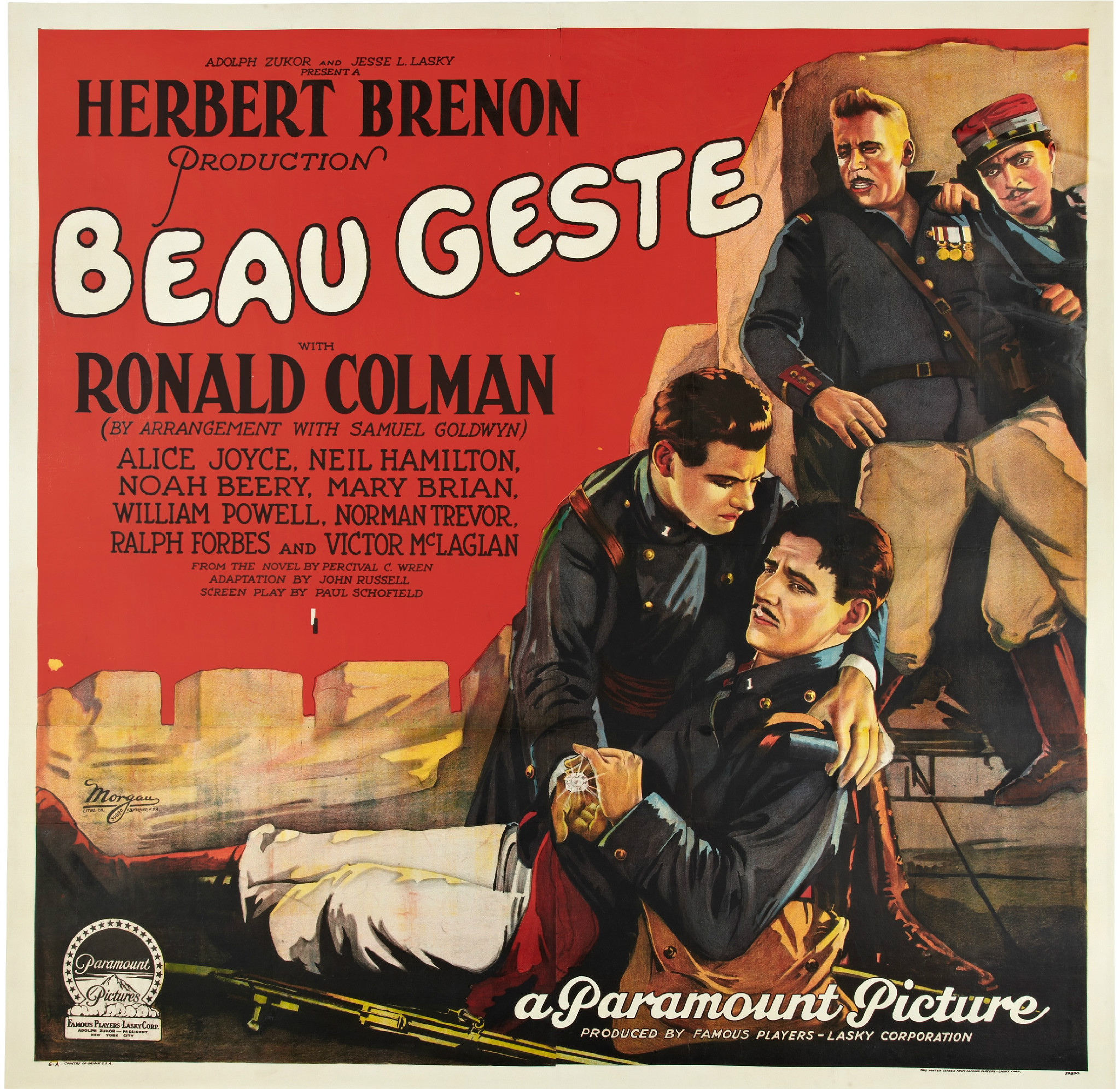

- The film Beau Geste, the first adaptation of the 1926 novel by P. C. Wren, opened, with Ronald Colman as the title character, Michael "Beau" Geste as a soldier of the French Foreign Legion, with Neil Hamilton and Ralph Forbes as his brothers and fellow soldiers. Directed by Herbert Brenon, the popular silent film won the Photoplay Medal of Honor, one of the highest accolades in the U.S. prior to the creation of the Academy Award.
- Died: Thomas Moran, 89, American illustrator and painter

== August 26, 1926 (Thursday) ==
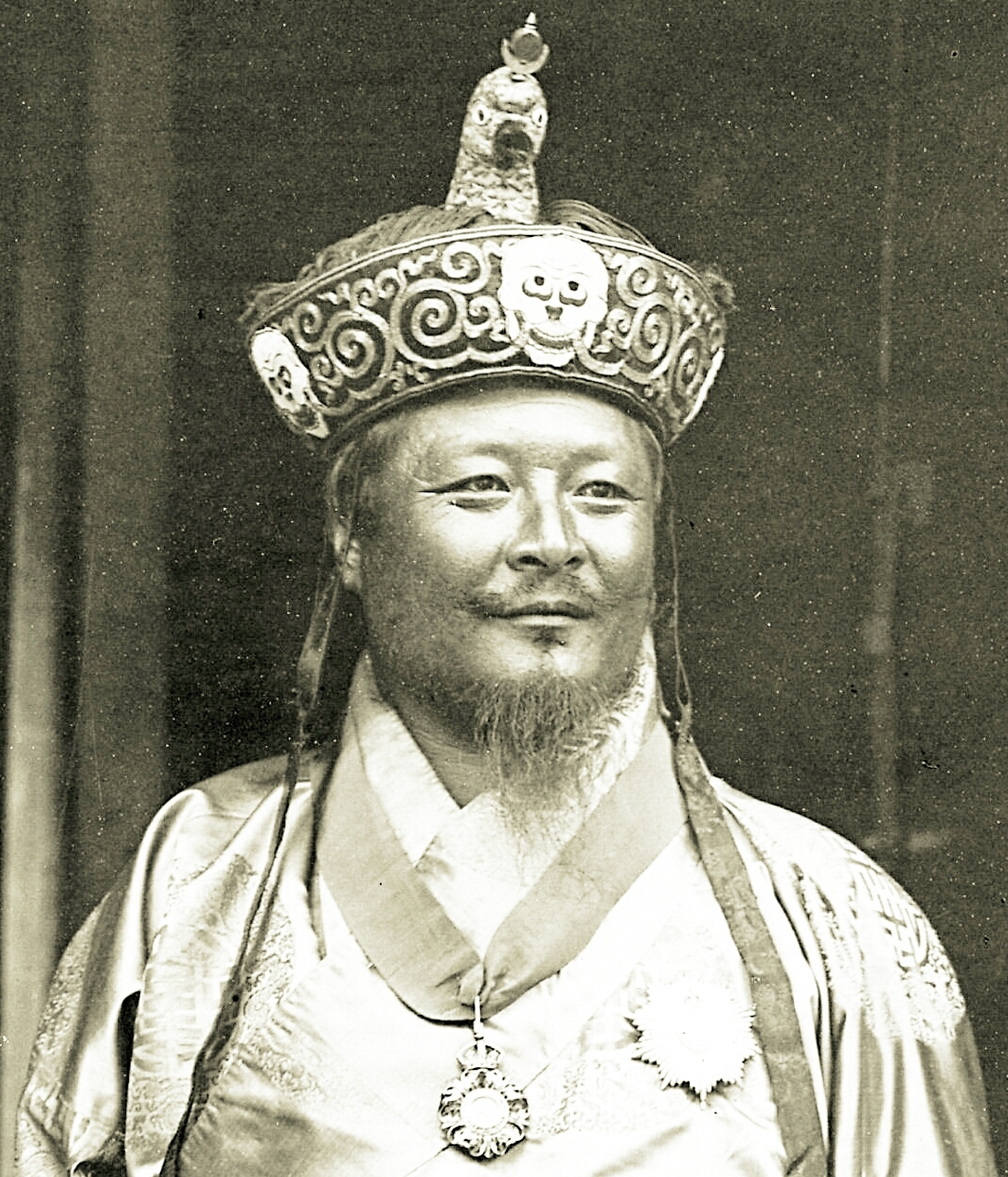
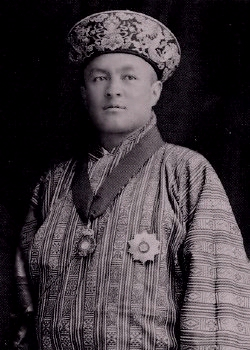
August 26, 1926: King Ugyen Wangchuck of Bhutan dies and his son Jigme Wangchuck becomes the new monarch.
- At the age of 21, Jigme Wangchuck became the new King of Bhutan, at the time a British protectorate, upon the death of his father, Ugyen Wangchuck. Jigme Wangchuck would rule until his own death in 1952.
- An explosion killed 44 of the 48 coal miners at the Clearfield Bituminous Coal Corporation's Clymer No. 1 mine in Clymer, Pennsylvania. Those not immediately killed by the blast died from asphyxiation by toxic gases.
- The classic German silent film Faust – Eine deutsche Volkssage (Faust – A German Folktale), directed by F. W. Murnau and adapted from the 1808 novel by Johann Goethe, premiered at the Ufa-Pavillon am Nollendorfplatz cinema. Released by the UFA film studios, the film starred Gösta Ekman as Faust and Emil Jannings as Mephisto.
- Spain demanded that the international district of Tangier be annexed to the Spanish zone of Morocco, which it asserted was necessary to suppress the contraband flow of arms that enabled the recent Rif revolt.
- Scouts de México, the Mexican scouting organization inspired by the Boy Scouts Association founded by Robert Baden-Powell in Britain, joined the 33 other members of the International Conference of the Boy Scout Movement.
- Born:
  - USMC Staff Sergeant William E. Shuck Jr., U.S. Marine who posthumously received the Medal of Honor recipient for his heroism in the Korean War; in Cumberland, Maryland (killed in battle, 1952)
- Died:
  - Nazim Bey (Selanikli Mehmed Nâzım Bey), 56, former Turkish Minister of Education, was executed by hanging after being convicted of conspiracy in the June 14 İzmir plot to assassinate Prime Minister Mustafa Kemal Nazim had been instrumental in overseeing the Armenian genocide from 1915 to 1917, and the expulsion of Ottoman Greeks from Western Anatolia from 1913 onward.
  - Mehmed Cavid, 51, former Turkish Minister of Finance, was hanged, along with intelligence officer Yenibahçeli Nail Bey, 51, and politician Filibeli Hilmi Bey, 41, after being convicted of conspiracy to kill Mustafa Kemal. Prime Minister İsmet İnönü would later write in his memoirs that Cavid had been completely innocent of the crimes charged.

== August 27, 1926 (Friday) ==
- An acceptable settlement to the ongoing Chilean–Peruvian territorial dispute was proposed by U.S. mediator Wade H. Ellis and U.S. Secretary of State Frank B. Kellogg, who suggested that the boundary line between the two nations should be the Arica–La Paz railway line running between the city of Arica in Chile and La Paz in Bolivia, with the area north of the railway (including the disputed territory of Tacna) going to Peru, and the area south of the railway (including the Arica province) going to Chile.
- A force of 195 American troops arrived in Nicaragua to protect American citizens and property during a rebel uprising against the Nicaraguan government, disembarking from USS Galveston at Bluefields.
- In Wanhsien (now known as the Wanzhou District) in China, troops loyal to the local warlord Wu Peifu under the command of General Yang Sen boarded a British merchant ship of The China Navigation Company, SS Wanhsien, and demanded transportation up the Yangtze River. Tensions had been high over a "wharfage" tax that the local authorities had been imposing on ships using the port. The ship's captain refused to leave port and a deadlock occurred until a boarding party from HMS Cockchafer investigated and the ship was released after an argument. This was the first in a chain of events culminating in the "Wanhsien Incident" of September 5.
- Born:
  - Kristen Nygaard, Norwegian computer scientist and co-inventor (with Ole-Johan Dahl) of object-oriented programming and the Simula programming language, 2001 winner of the Turing Award; in Oslo (d. 2002)
  - Reg Watson, Australian television producer; in Brisbane (d. 2019)
  - Pat Coombs, English character actress; in Camberwell, London (d. 2002)
  - Jacqueline Grennan Wexler, American Roman Catholic nun and university president (d. 2012)
- Died:
  - U.S. Navy Commander John Rodgers, 45, American naval officer and aviator who held the record for furthest non-stop flight, 1,992 miles (3,206 km), in 1925 in an attempt to fly from California to Hawaii, was killed when the plane he was piloting crashed into the Delaware River.

== August 28, 1926 (Saturday) ==
- Dutch Levsen of the Cleveland Indians became the last pitcher in major league baseball history to start and win both games of a doubleheader, defeating the Boston Red Sox 6-1 and 5–1.
- Born:
  - Darrell Lemaire, American chemist and psychedelic drug designer known for developing the TWEETIO (2-EtO) family of Substituted phenethylamine hallucinogenic compounds; in Reno, Nevada (d. 2019)

== August 29, 1926 (Sunday) ==
- A group of 58 Chinese Kuomintang soldiers drowned when the sampan boat they were in was accidentally capsized by the Chinese freighter Wanliu, which had recently been freed by the Royal Navy after being held on the Yangtze River. General Yang Sen, a warlord in the Guizhou province, sent troops to take over the Wanliu to demand compensation, and British troops on HMS Cockchafer (which had rescued the British merchant ship SS Wanhsien from General Yang) freed the Wanliu.
- A crowd of 20,000 German monarchists staged an assembly in Nuremberg to hail their "king", Rupprecht of Bavaria. Prince Oskar of Prussia and Field Marshal August von Mackensen also attended the event.
- Cork GAA defeated Kilkenny GAA to win the All-Ireland championship of hurling, by a score of 4–6 to 2-0 (equivalent to 18-2 under the rules awarding 3 points for a goal). The title game was the field game to be broadcast outside of the United States (although a boxing bout had been reported on live radio earlier in the year).
- The Italian soccer football club ACF Fiorentina, which would win the Coppa Italia six times, and finish in first place in Serie A twice in its first 100 years, was founded in Florence by the merger of the teams CS Firenze and PG Libertas.
- Amelia Gade Corson became the second woman to swim across the English Channel, 22 days after Gertrude Ederle had become the first.
- Born:
  - F. Clifford Rose, British neurologist known for developing ambulance neuroimaging service to detect reversible brain damage following strokes; as Frank Clifford Rosenberg in London (d.2012)
  - Donn Fendler, American author best known for his survival at age 12 for nine days in 1939 without food or water when he was lost on Mount Katahdin; in Rye, New York (d. 2016)
  - Betty Lynn, American actress TV and film actress best known for the role of "Thelma Lou" on The Andy Griffith Show; in Kansas City, Missouri (d. 2021)

== August 30, 1926 (Monday) ==
- The sinking of the Soviet steamer Burevestnik killed 65 passengers and crew after the ship was attempting to avoid a collision with an incoming ship, the German ship Greta and rammed a pier. Burevestnik had departed from Leningrad (now Saint Petersburg) on a voyage to Kronstadt and the collision occurred while the ship was in the Sea Canal. Despite reports of 300 dead, most of the 404 passengers and 11 crew were rescued.
- A funeral Mass for Rudolph Valentino was held at Saint Malachy's Roman Catholic Church in New York. Thousands watched the funeral cortège as it proceeded down Broadway.
- The first air "sleeper" flew from Berlin to London. The Hansa-designed biplane had a toilet, wireless phone and berths with beds for four passengers.
- The last voting rights of Italians were removed as the Fascist government abolished the popular election of municipal officers, who were now to be appointed by the state.
- Nine passengers on a charabanc open motor carriage were killed by an express train at Naworth, Cumberland after the keeper of the railroad crossing lifted the gate and waved the vehicle into the train's path.
- Died:
  - Sir Michael Cashin, 61, former Prime Minister of the Dominion of Newfoundland in 1919
  - Eddie Lyons, 39, American film comedian with the team of Lyons and Moran, died from an illness

== August 31, 1926 (Tuesday) ==
- The Soviet and Afghan governments signed a Pact of Neutrality and Non-Aggression to supplement an earlier agreement.
- A 5.9 magnitude earthquake in Horta in the Azores killed nine people and destroyed over 4,000 buildings.
- Lionello Perera, whose Perera Bank in New York had survived a 1924 panic, reorganized his company into the Commercial Exchange Bank of New York, providing the means for Amadeo Giannini to expand the operations of his Bank of Italy in California, using Perera's Exchange Bank in order to operate in the state of New York, and creating the first nationwide private bank in the United States, the Bank of America.
- Major General Ptolemaios Sarigiannis, Chief of Staff of the Greek Army during the dictatorship of General Theodoros Pangalos, was dismissed from his job nine days after Pangalos' overthrow, and replaced by Major General Alexandros Mazarakis-Ainian.
- In Wanhsien, troops of General Yang Sen seized SS Wanhsien for a second time in a week, and captured another merchant ship, Wantung. The commander of HMS Cockchafer did not have enough men to retake both ships this time, so he radioed for help.
- Died:
  - Theodora Korte, 53, German author and journalist who also wrote under the name Theo von Nienhaus, died after a long illness.
