= Ekkirala =

Ekkirala (Telugu: ఎక్కిరాల) is a Telugu surname. Notable people with the surname include:

- Ekkirala Bharadwaja, Indian Hindu monk (1938–1989)
- Ekkirala Krishnamacharya, Indian academic and spiritual guru (1926–1984)
