= Merlini =

Merlini may refer to:

== People ==
- Bautista Merlini (born 1995), Argentine football midfielder
- David Merlini (born 1978), Hungarian escape artist
- Domenico Merlini (1730–1797), Polish-Italian architect
- Elsa Merlini (1903–1983), Italian film actress
- Giovanni Merlini (1795-1873), Italian Roman Catholic priest
- Luciano Merlini (1930-1986), Swiss former footballer
- Marisa Merlini (1923–2008), Italian character actress
- Milinka Merlini (1929–1996), Serbian and French chess master
- Orlando Merlini (died in 1510), Italian painter
- Richard Merlini (b. 1965), Canadian politician
- Robert Merlini (born Robert Robbins; 1926–1964), Australian illusionist, stage performer and television performer
- Sergio Merlini (born 1962), Argentine retired footballer

== Other ==
- Pseudhymenochirus merlini, a species of frog
- The Great Merlini, fictional detective
- Vita Merlini, a work by author Geoffrey of Monmouth
