= Noble privileges in Poland after the March Constitution =

Legal status post 1921

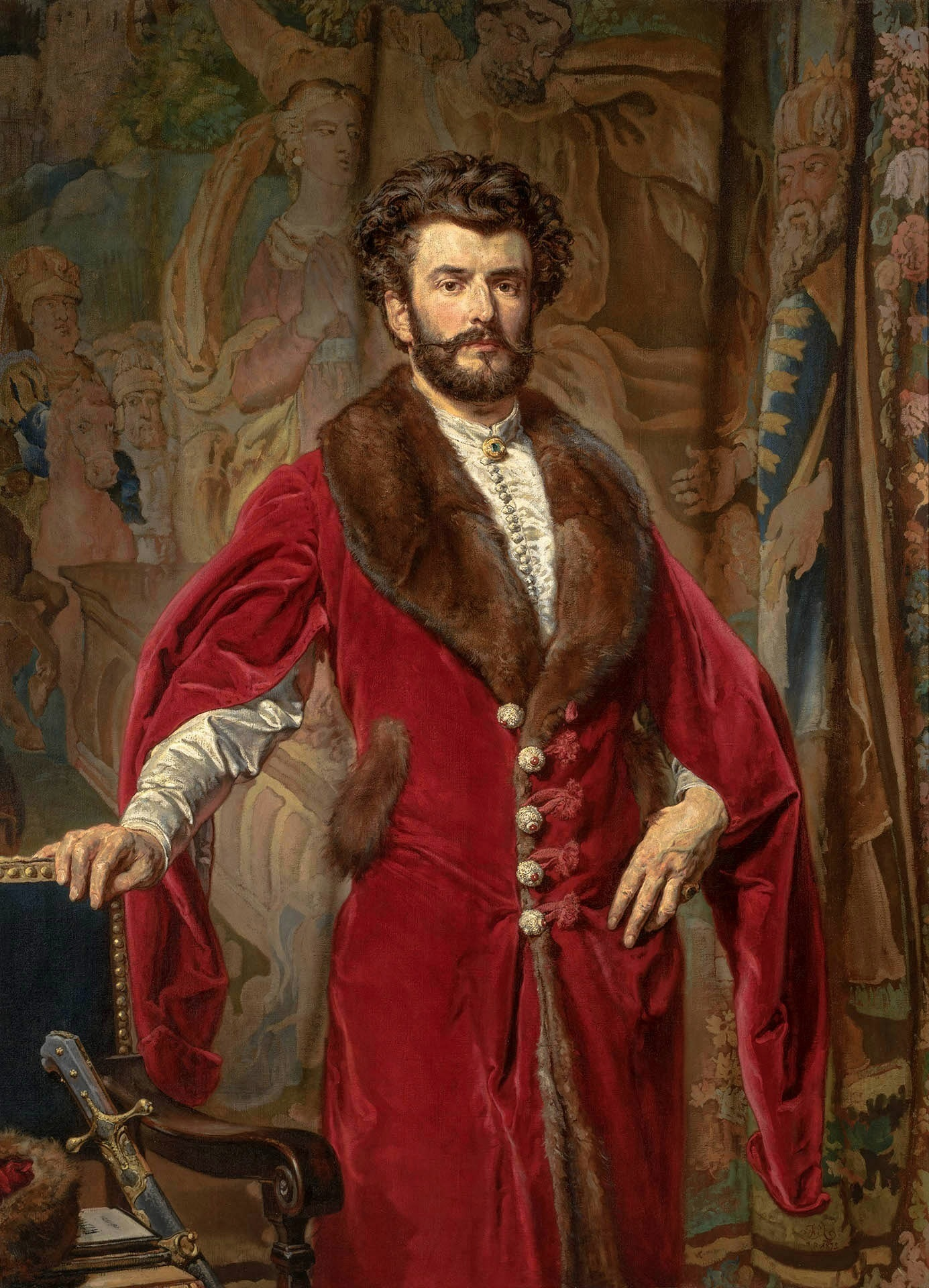
Portrait of Józef Ciechoński, by Jan Matejko (1873), depicting a Polish nobleman in classic Sarmatian attire

Noble privileges in Poland after the March Constitution is an issue that concerns the legal and social status of hereditary titles, noble status and coats of arms in the constitutional regulations of the Second Polish Republic and in subsequent legislation. The issue is linked to the political transformations following Poland’s regained independence in 1918 and to efforts to unify the legal system after the Partitions of Poland.

Debates over the extent to which former estate privileges should be recognized or abolished concerned both the interpretation of the March Constitution of 1921 and later changes introduced by subsequent constitutional acts, as well as social practice and the general legal order. The question of the fate of nobility after 1918 remains part of broader academic and judicial discussion, and of considerations about the protection of hereditary heritage and cultural tradition in Poland in the 20th and 21st centuries.

== History ==
=== Historical background ===
After the end of the Partitions of Poland and the collapse of the monarchies that had ruled the lands of the former Polish–Lithuanian Commonwealth for more than 120 years, the re-established Polish state faced numerous political and social challenges.

Society was still made up of the same families and local communities, while a major problem was the variety of legal systems inherited from the partitioning powers. The Second Polish Republic undertook efforts to unify them relatively quickly, although some solutions survive to this day. One of the issues that has persisted was that of honorific and aristocratic titles previously used, among other places, in Congress Poland.

=== The March Constitution of 1921 ===
Article 96 of the 1921 March Constitution stated:

“All citizens are equal before the law. Public offices are equally accessible to all on terms prescribed by law. The Republic of Poland does not recognize hereditary or estate privileges, nor any coats of arms, hereditary titles and the like, except for academic, official and professional ones. A citizen of the Republic may not accept foreign titles or orders without the consent of the President of the Republic.”

art. 96, March Constitution, 1921

The provision was widely debated in the Second Polish Republic. Some interpreted it as a complete abolition of nobility and coats of arms, while others saw it only as confirmation that the Polish state no longer afforded special legal protection to the nobility and aristocracy.

Despite the wording of the article, hereditary titles continued to be used in political and diplomatic life. Among public figures who consistently used them were Count Maurycy Zamoyski, Prince Eustachy Sapieha, Count Aleksander Skrzyński, General Count Stanisław Szeptycki, Count Stefan Przezdziecki, Count Michał Łubieński, Franciszek and Count Józef Potocki, Roger and Count Edward Raczyński, Count Karol Romer, Count Adolf Bniński and Prince Janusz Radziwiłł. Cardinal Adam Stefan Sapieha was also referred to at the time as the “Prince Archbishop”.

Thus noble titles functioned both in social interactions and in diplomatic practice, including correspondence with representatives of other states. The only exception were official legal acts and government documents published in the Second Republic, where such titles were not used formally.

The March Constitution of 17 March 1921, in Article 96, stated that the state did not recognize hereditary or estate privileges, nor coats of arms and hereditary titles (with the exception of academic, official and professional ones). This was read as a refusal by state authorities to recognize the category of “nobility”, rather than a statutory “abolition” of the estate in the historical-legal sense.

According to Franciszek Bossowski, a key to interpreting the 1921 March Constitution is its use of the phrase that the Republic “does not recognize hereditary or estate privileges, nor any coats of arms, hereditary titles and the like”. Bossowski stressed the difference between “non-recognition” and “abolition”. Abolition would mean complete removal from the legal order of all related privileges, coats of arms and titles, and in extreme cases even family names or hereditary property. Non-recognition was less radical, leading only to the repeal of privileges and a ban on using coats of arms and titles in official acts. Commentators emphasized that the legislator could not erase the historical role of the nobility or destroy traditions and a sense of duty tied to noble origin. They pointed out that the final removal of estate differences in the Eastern Borderlands occurred only by virtue of the presidential regulation of 15 October 1927.

Bossowski also argued that social inequalities are an inevitable result of modern social structure. Eliminating the nobility does not remove hierarchy but leads to the rise of a new dominant class, often inferior in culture and morals. As an example he cited the Soviet Union, where—despite revolutionary destruction of former strata—various ranks and class privileges were gradually restored. He also pointed to early-20th-century England and Belgium, arguing that improvement in workers’ living standards came not through social revolutions against the nobility but through general prosperity, capital accumulation and state stability.

Mainstream constitutional doctrine, represented for example by Prof. Władysław Maliniak, held that the 1921 provision did not prohibit the use of titles and coats of arms in private or social life, but excluded their placement in official documents such as civil-status records or service appointments. It also meant that in the Second Republic noble titles and coats of arms enjoyed no legal protection and that the legislature could not confer new or old titles or coats of arms.

=== The April Constitution of 1935 ===
The April Constitution of 1935 repealed Article 96 of the 1921 March Constitution, introducing Article 81(2):

“(2) At the same time, the Act of 17 March 1921 (Journal of Laws No. 44, item 267) together with the amendments introduced by the Act of 2 August 1926 (Journal of Laws No. 78, item 442) is repealed, except for Articles 99, 109–118 and 120.” art. 81(2), April Constitution, 1935

Polish senator and Supreme Court judge Ignacy Baliński wrote in Kurier Warszawski on 11 August 1935 that the new constitution (23 April 1935), by repealing the March Constitution (except for several provisions), simultaneously repealed Article 96 which had stated that the Republic did not recognize nobility, coats of arms or hereditary titles.

Having noted that the new constitution departed from the principle of equality before the law, Baliński presented two possible interpretations regarding the legal status of nobility. Under the first, “broad” interpretation, the repeal of the clause regarding nobility and titles amounted in practice to their renewed recognition, restoring the pre-1921 state (without privileges). Consequently, possession, use and disclosure of noble status and titles would be legally permissible and could appear in official documents, civil-status acts, passports or notarial deeds, provided proper proof according to pre-partition or partition-era procedures.

The second, narrower interpretation held that mere renewed state recognition of nobility and titles did not automatically revive their prior status, since they had been abolished; their use or conferment would require new regulations.

According to Ludgard Grocholski and the editorial board of the pre-war periodical Herold, which dealt exclusively with heraldry, only the first interpretation was applicable. Article 96 of the March Constitution did not abolish nobility or titles; it merely stated that the Republic of Poland did not recognize them.

The removal of the 1921 restrictions and the return of titles in personal documentation prompted the emergence of various heraldic institutes that verified proofs of noble status for private purposes.

On 7 November 1935, a meeting at the Polish Institute of Administrative Law addressed the status of coats of arms and titles under the then-binding constitution. The opening paper argued that the repeal of Article 96 and the absence of replacement provisions removed previous restrictions and allowed their use in official documents, while stressing that no special legal privileges could be attached to them.

Participants largely agreed with this view, differing only in details. The chair underlined that the lack of a former prohibition meant the repeal of the non-recognition clause rather than the automatic restoration of noble estate; formal (re-)introduction would require a special statute, which some argued would not contradict the constitution.

Soon after, legal press commentary discussed the consequences of the absence of an equivalent to former Article 96. In Przegląd Notarialny (No. 17, 1935) judge and prosecutor Jakub Glass argued that, given the unequivocal repeal of Article 96, there were no obstacles to using titles and coats of arms in all types of acts and documents of state and self-government authorities. He termed these designations “honorary”, borrowing the term from Congress Poland law, and stressed he was describing the state of the law de lege lata, not proposing de lege ferenda.

=== The Constitution of the Republic of Poland of 1997 ===
The currently binding 1997 Constitution of the Republic of Poland likewise did not repeat a clause comparable to Article 96 of the 1921 March Constitution.

Notably, Article 64 of the 1997 Constitution states:

“Everyone shall have the right to ownership, other property rights and the right of succession.” art. 64, Constitution of the Republic of Poland, 1997

According to Prof. Sławomir Górzyński, the right of succession—placed among cultural rights—covers the protection of family heritage, including elements of cultural identity such as a family coat of arms, as well as rights once acquired that are tied to one’s hereditary, cultural or family identity. Particularly important is the right to one’s surname, which determines belonging to a community that inherits a given tradition. This right, guaranteed by the 1997 Constitution, is not in doubt. Górzyński adds that a surname, coat of arms, byname and hereditary title indicating membership in a community are undeniably hereditary elements not subject to restriction. This type of emotional and identity link with family and tradition was confirmed by the Katowice Court of Appeal on 10 April 2002 (case I ACa 1399/01), which held:

“The emotional bond that may connect a natural person with a coat of arms owned by their family justifies classifying the coat of arms as a personal good within the meaning of Article 23 of the Civil Code.” I ACa 1399/01, Court of Appeal in Katowice, 2002

The judgment was issued in a case brought against the Żywiec brewery by the Polish line of the Habsburgs.

Protection of coats of arms was also affirmed by the Supreme Court in a judgment of 7 March 2003 (case I CKN 100/01), which stated that a symbol identifying a legal person (thus also a coat of arms) is a carrier of its identity and, like its name or firm, constitutes a personal good of the legal person.

=== Supreme Administrative Court ruling (II OSK 1160/07) of 8 October 2008 ===
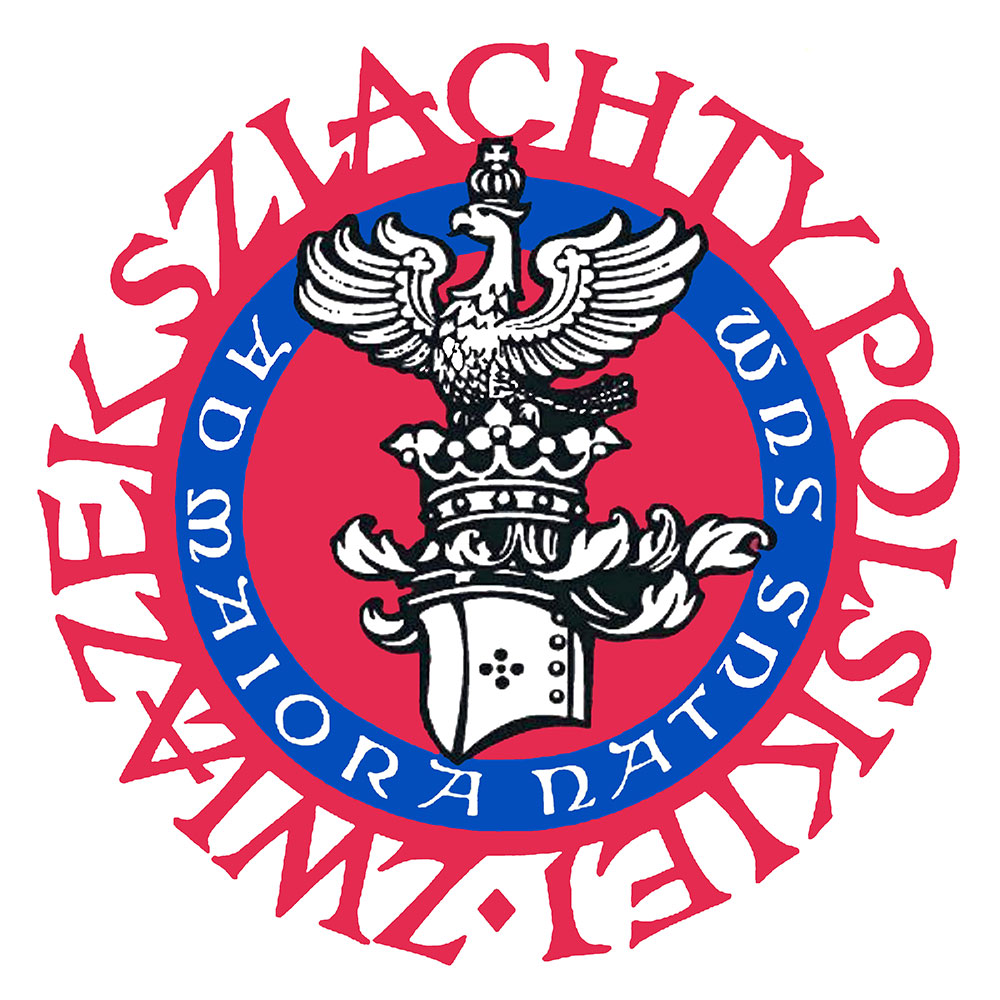
Logo of the Polish Nobility Association

In 2006 a resident of Łódź applied to the Civil Registry Office to supplement his birth certificate by adding the element “count” before his surname and, in the “remarks” field, a note that he was the “heir of hereditary estates and manor”.

The head of the office refused, citing Article 18 of the Law on Civil Status Records, which provides that a birth certificate may contain only data required by law. The decision was upheld by the Łódź Voivode, and the man’s complaint was dismissed by the Provincial Administrative Court in Łódź.

The case reached the Supreme Administrative Court (II OSK 1160/07), which on 8 October 2008 dismissed the cassation complaint. The Court held that a birth certificate may contain only data specified by binding law and that it is impermissible to add extra information, including hereditary titles.

The reasoning emphasized that any private use of noble titles was irrelevant to the case; the point was that civil-status records include only statutorily prescribed data. The ruling therefore did not decide the permissibility of using noble titles in private circulation, but only the inadmissibility of entering such data on a birth certificate.

Polish courts have not, however, refused recognition of surname elements historically associated with nobility. Polish case law has accepted prefixes characteristic of foreign aristocratic surnames (e.g. German, Dutch or French), such as “von”, “van” or “de”, e.g. in the Supreme Court decision of 26 November 1998 (I CKU 103/98).

== Bibliography ==
- Grocholski, Ludgard (1935). "Szlachectwo wobec nowej konstytucji" (PDF). Herold (in Polish). 7–9. Warszawa: Organ Kolegjum Heraldycznego: 102–105.
- Bossowski, Franciszek (1935). "Nowa konstytucja a szlachectwo" (PDF). Herold (in Polish). 11. Warszawa: Organ Kolegjum Heraldycznego: 170–176.
- Piskorski, Tomasz (1936). Konstytucja 1935 r. a tzw. tytuły rodowe (in Polish). Warszawa: Drukarnia Polska. pp. 3–31.
- Górzyński, Sławomir (2008). "Tytuły w dawnej Rzeczypospolitej i obecnie — praktyka i prawo". Rocznik Polskiego Towarzystwa Heraldycznego (in Polish). VIII: 127–129.
- Kowalczyk, Marta (2020). "Ku „prawu do znieważania"? RPO przeciw ochronie symboli państwowych, lokalnych i religijnych". W obronie praw obywatelskich czy ideologii? (PDF) (in Polish). Warszawa: Fundacja Instytut na rzecz Kultury Prawnej Ordo Iuris. p. 59. ISBN 978-83-957763-5-9.
