= Fanindra Bose =

Indian sculptor in Scotland (1888–1926)

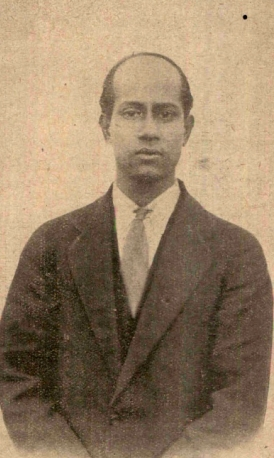

Fanindra Nath Bose (2 March 1888 – 1 August 1926) was a Bengal-born sculptor known for his small works in bronze. He worked in Scotland and for sometime was appointed sculptor to the Gaekwar Maharaja Sayajirao III of Baroda.

== Life and work ==
Bose was born in Bohor, Vikrampura, Bengal, son of Babu Taranath Bose. He joined the Jubilee Art Academy and then went to the Government School of Art at Calcutta where he studied under E.B. Havell. He then moved to England and joined the Royal Institution at Edinburgh. He joined the Edinburgh College of Art in 1909 studying under Percy Portsmouth and received a diploma in 1911. A travel scholarship of £100 allowed him to study in Paris under Auguste Rodin and M.J.A. Mercie. He returned to Scotland and set up a studio in Edinburgh, exhibiting first at the Royal Scottish Academy in 1913 two statuettes "The Boy and the Crab" and "The Hunter". The second caught the attention of the Maharaja of Gaekwar who had another copy made for him apart from several other commissions for the Laxmi Vilas Palace and Gardens. The original was bought by Sir William Gascombe John. He visited Baroda briefly and taught sculpture at the Kala Bhavan. Other sculptures by Bose are at the War Memorial, East Lothian, and St. John's Kirk in Perth. He was the first Indian member of the Royal Scottish Academy, elected in 1925.

In India, the Modern Review of May 1921 carried a review of his work by Ordhendra Coomar Gangoly under the pen name of "Agastya" who, like nationalists of the period, criticized Bose's work as "un-Indian".

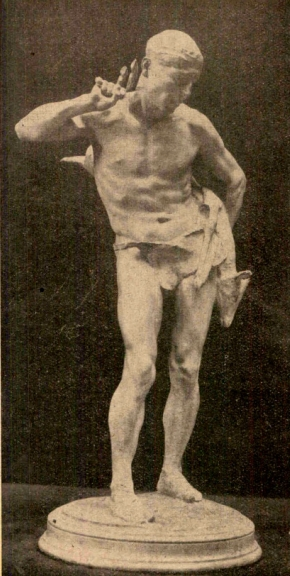
The Hunter

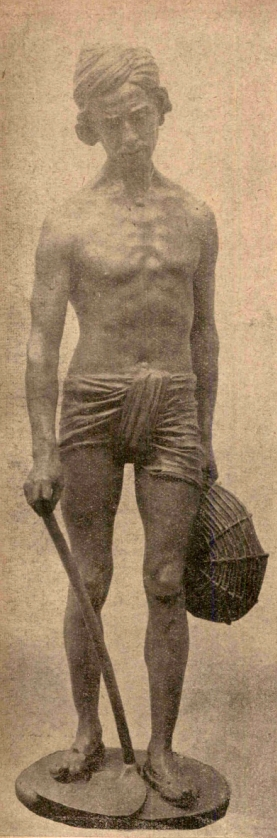
End of the Day

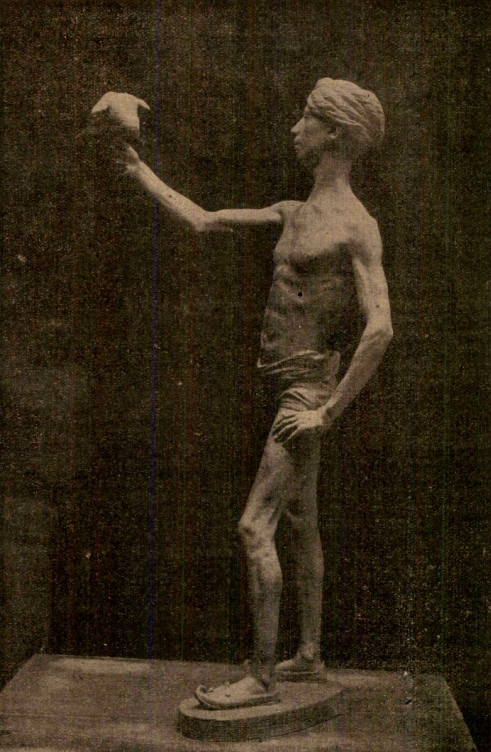
The Falconer

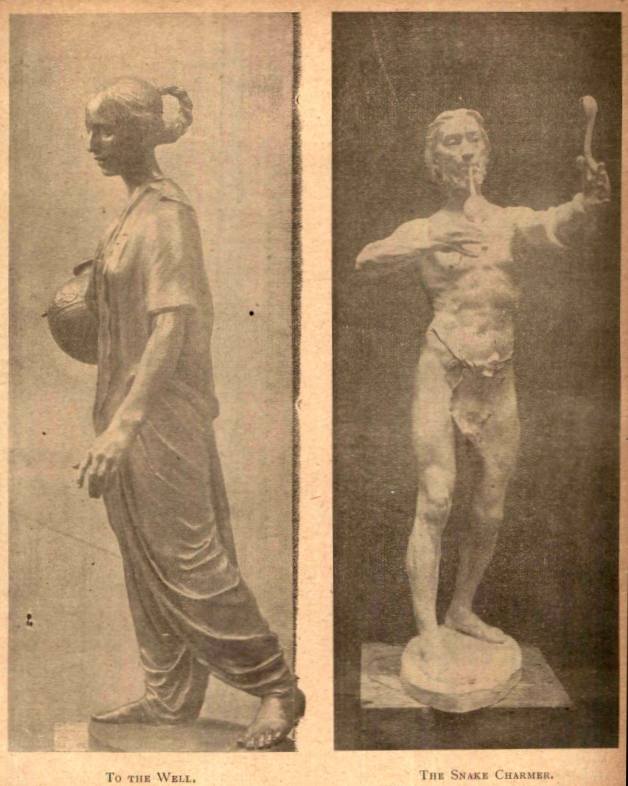
To the well and Snake charmer

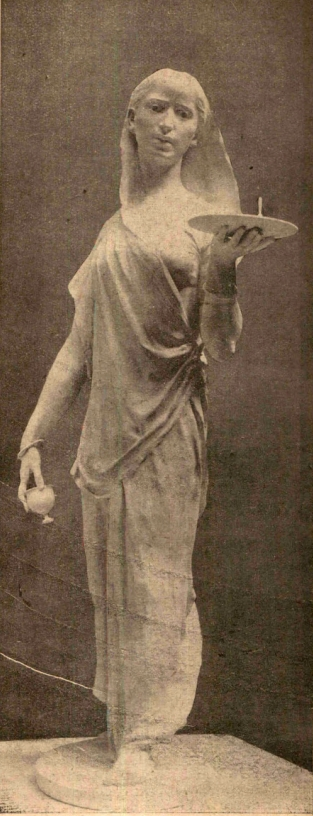
To the temple

== Death ==
On 1 August 1926, Bose suffered a heart attack while angling in a loch near Peebles, and is buried in Liberton Cemetery in Edinburgh. He was 38.
