= Sam Mattingly =

American entrepreneur

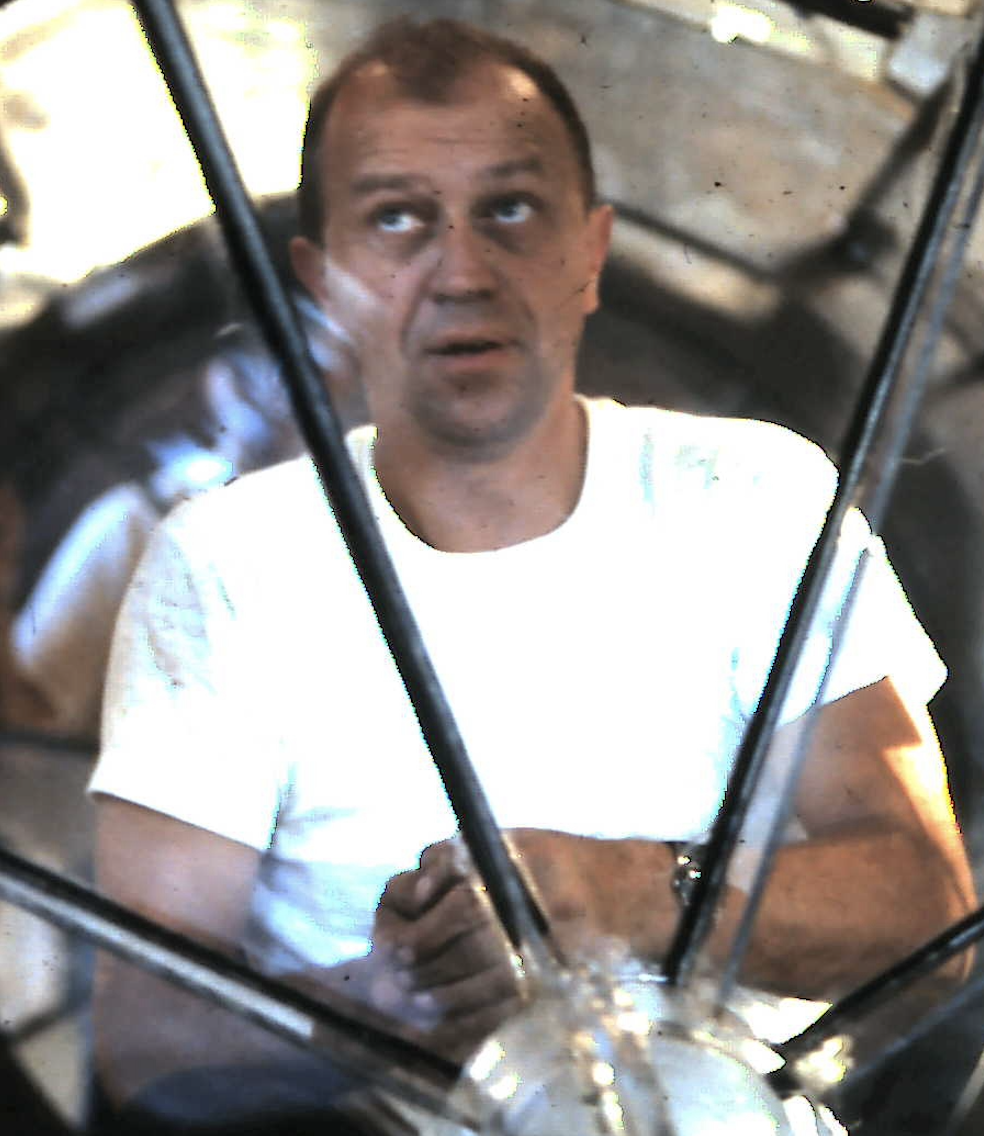
- Sam Mattingly testing Gemini Program orbital workshop for safety in 1965
- Born: George Samuel Mattingly; 10 August 1926; Baltimore, Maryland
- Died: 4 November 2014 (aged 88); Salisbury, Maryland, U.S.

George Samuel (Sam) Mattingly (1926 – 2014) was an entrepreneur who visualized and created the first Neutral buoyancy simulation as a training aid system that NASA used in training astronauts for Extravehicular activity (EVA) or "walking in space". Three published research articles provide primary references that credit Sam and his business partner, Harry Loats, as the pioneers who convinced NASA to use neutral buoyancy as their primary training method toward preparing astronauts for missions that required venturing outside of their spacecraft. Their accomplishments were also well documented in the Baltimore Sun newspaper in 2009, NASA contract NAS1-4059, NASA Technical Note TN D-3054, and "A personal history of underwater neutral buoyancy simulation"

The need for this training method was based on reduced-gravity aircraft flights limiting weightless periods to 20 seconds.

Ensuring safety before placing others in a potentially hazardous situation, Sam was the first person to enter a swimming pool in a weighted pressurized suit for this purpose. This first demonstration allowed NASA officials to see how neutral buoyancy could be used for training that allowed astronauts to practice tasks that required much more than 20 seconds.

Sam also served in leadership roles with several ice hockey teams and organizations in Maryland. He coached a Baltimore area high school hockey team to the Maryland state championship in 1954, and he and his wife travelled to Moscow in 1972 to see Team Canada play against the Soviet Union in the Summit Series.

== Early Life and Formal Education ==
Sam was born on August 10, 1926 in Baltimore, Maryland. He played football and ice hockey at Calvert Hall College High School before graduating in 1944, and then he immediately enlisted in the United States Army Air Corps, serving as a mechanic for the Douglas C-47 Skytrain aircraft. In addition, Sam trained in the Caribbean in Puerto Rico along with many others for the eventual World War II invasion of Japan, known as Operation Downfall.

Later in life, in 1983, Sam returned to college and completed his undergraduate degree in business administration at Towson University in Maryland.

== Training Astronauts for Walking in Space ==
At the end of WWII, Sam returned to Baltimore and worked in several businesses before partnering with Harry Loats to form Environmental Research Associates (ERA) in Randallstown, Maryland.

As explained by astronaut Thomas David Jones, Sam Mattingly and Harry Loats demonstrated the first neutrally buoyant maneuvers in a weighted pressurized Mark IV Mercury Spacesuit in a Langley Air Force Base swimming pool. After receiving their first contract, ERA moved their work to the swimming pool of McDonogh School in Owings Mills, Maryland.

25 July 1966 directive memo from Robert R. Gilruth to Deke Slayton

As noted by Michael Neufeld in and and astronaut Tom Jones in, the influence for the Langley Research Center to award contract NAS1-4059 to ERA came from difficulties experienced by several astronauts during EVAs within Project Gemini missions Gemini 4 thru Gemini 11. ERA remained under contract with NASA for this work until 1967, when NASA opened their first of several pools for neutrally buoyant training

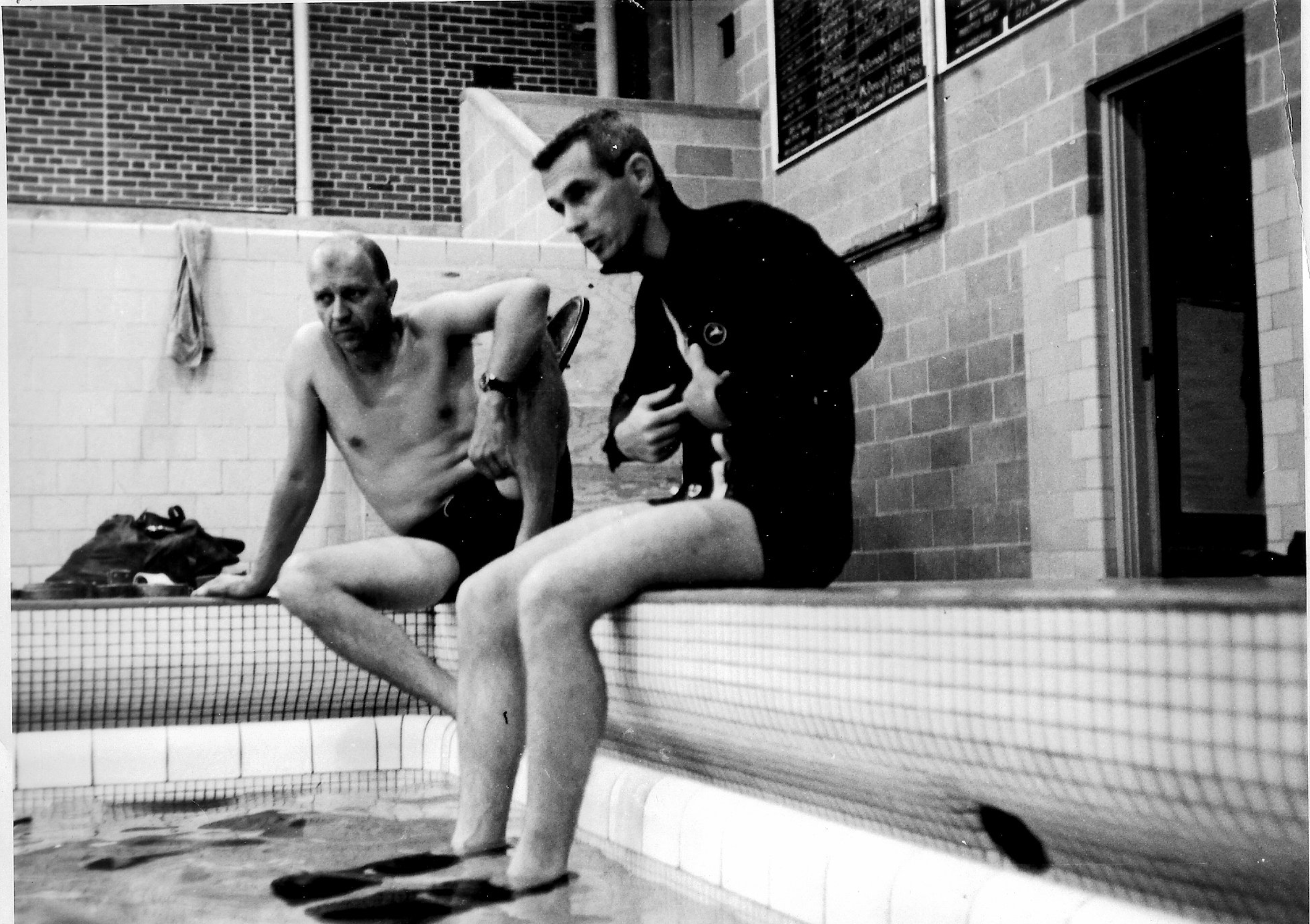
Gene Cernan with Sam Mattingly at McDonogh School pool in July 1966

ERA initially demonstrated their capabilities to NASA at the Langley Research Center (LRC) in 1964. After those demonstrations, NASA awarded a contract to ERA for further research on capabilities for astronauts to egress from vehicles in outer space, perform simulations for tasks that would lead to construction of modular systems, (eventually enabling construction of the International Space Station) and allowing astronauts to return safely into their spacecraft. ERA's accomplishments and task reports are documented in which serves as a report for research studies and services accomplished under contract NAS1-4059 (reference 5).

As noted in reference 7 (A personal history of underwater neutral buoyancy simulation), ERA gained use of the indoor pool at McDonogh School in June of 1964 to conduct tasks toward fulfilling NASA contract NAS1-4059. Normal ERA use was during evening hours when the school would not be using the pool. ERA continued to use the McDonogh pool throughout the rest of 1964 and on into 1967 for objectives within their contract with LRC. However, based on difficulties during EVAs experienced by astronauts during all Gemini missions thus far, Robert R. Gilruth, Director of NASA's Manned Spacecraft Center, sent a note to Deke Slayton, Director of NASA Flight Crew Operations, on 25 July 1966.

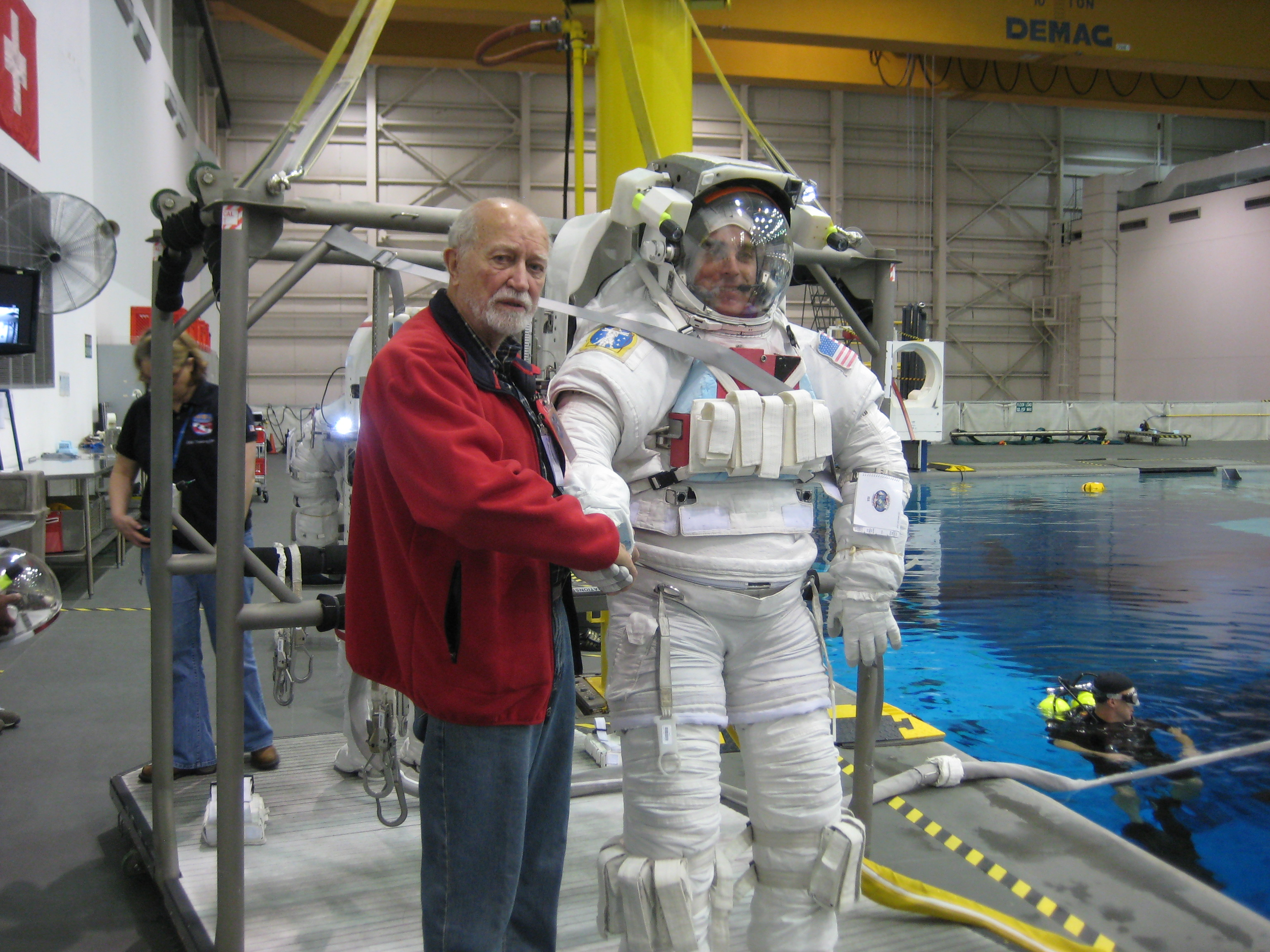
Sam Mattingly and Astronaut Christopher Cassidy in NASA's Neutral Buoyancy Laboratory

The memo, as shown in the corresponding thumbnail (above), directed astronauts Ed White (astronaut), Eugene Cernan, and Michael Collins (astronaut) to be involved in underwater testing by ERA in Randallstown, Maryland.

In compliance with Mr. Gilruth's directive, Gene Cernan travelled to Baltimore to work with ERA for reviewing difficulties that Cernan experienced during his EVA as part of the Gemini 9A mission on 3-6 June 1966. As referenced in a feature article published by the Baltimore Sun newspaper in 2009, Cernan's review took place during normal operating hours for McDonogh's pool, Cernan agreed to explain what was happening in the pool to McDonogh students, as represented in the corresponding photo.

As noted in references 1, 2, and 3 ERA's most significant impact on NASA's capabilities came from training astronaut Buzz Aldrin for his Gemini 12 EVAs at McDonogh School.

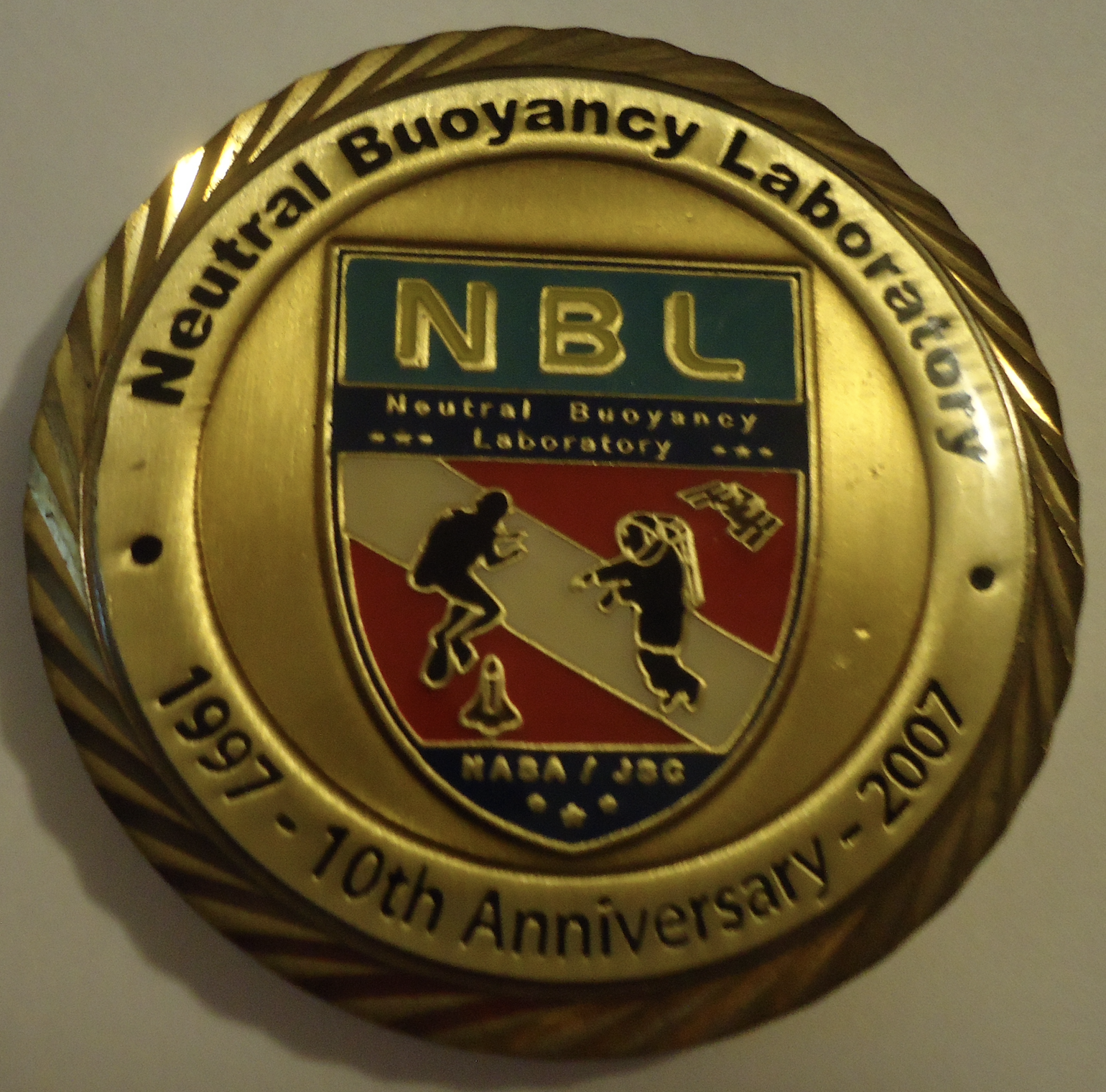
NBL 1997-2007 10th Anniversary Challenge Coin (Front side)

After their initial successes in neutral buoyancy training with ERA, NASA eventually built the Neutral Buoyancy Laboratory (NBL) into a pre-existing aircraft facility that is dedicated to Astronaut Sonny Carter.

As documented in "A personal history of underwater neutral buoyancy simulation", Sam toured the NBL in December of 2009, where he met with Astronaut Chris Cassidy and he received NBL's challenge coin #0114 from the Director of the NBL, Mr. Ron Lee.

Mr. Lee presented the coin for achievements in neutral buoyancy science research, accomplished by Environmental Research Associates, as represented by Sam Mattingly and Harry Loats during NASA's Gemini program.

== Ice Hockey Player, Coach, and Leader ==
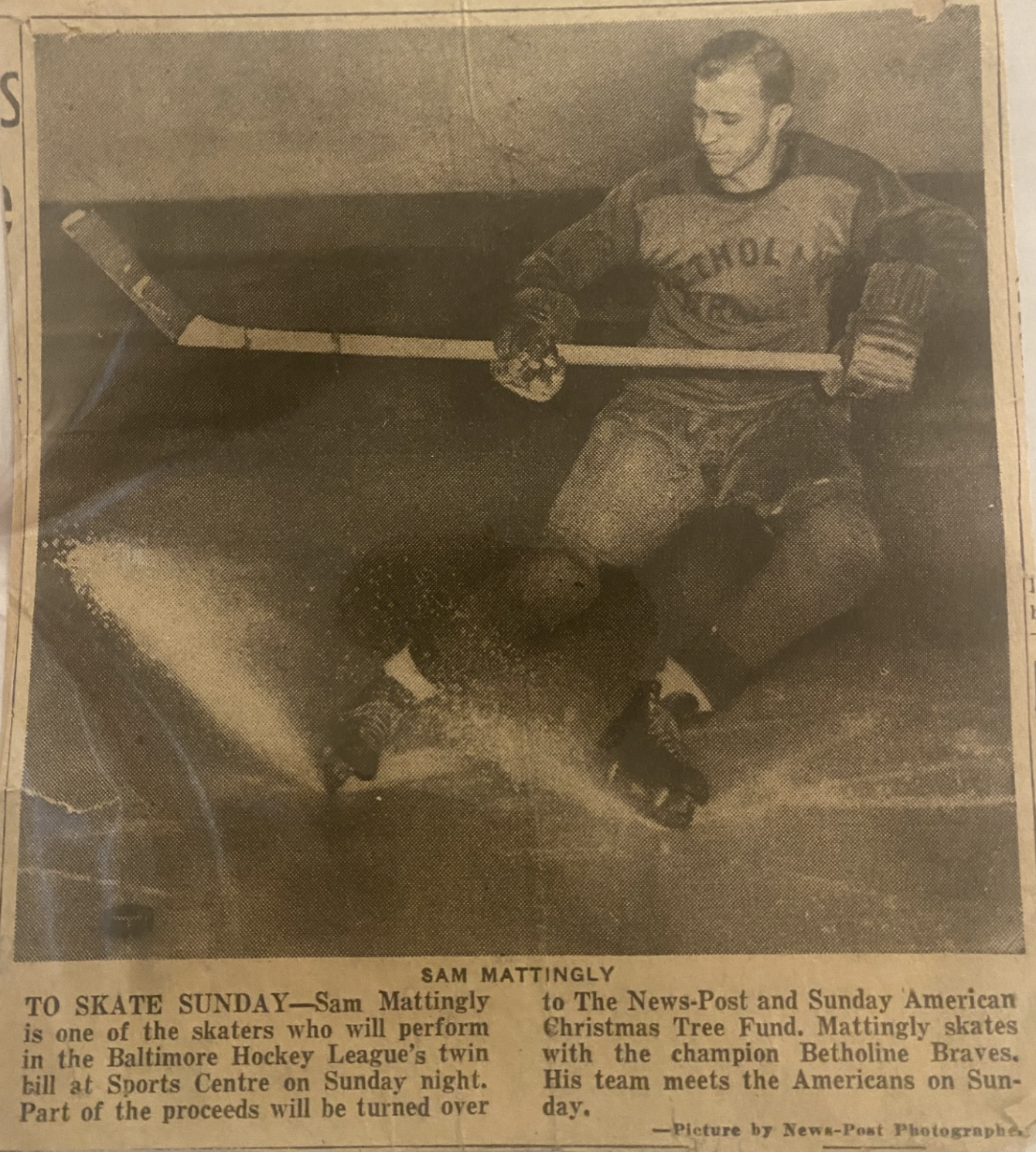
Sam Mattingly with the Betholine Braves in the Baltimore News-Post

Before his work with NASA and the Langley Research Center, one of Sam played and coached organized ice hockey in Baltimore. As noted in several versions of the Baltimore Hockey League competed in Baltimore from the late 1800s into the 1950s. The corresponding thumbnail from the Baltimore News-Post newspaper shows Sam in 1949, playing for the Betholine Braves during the 1946-49 version of the Baltimore Hockey League.

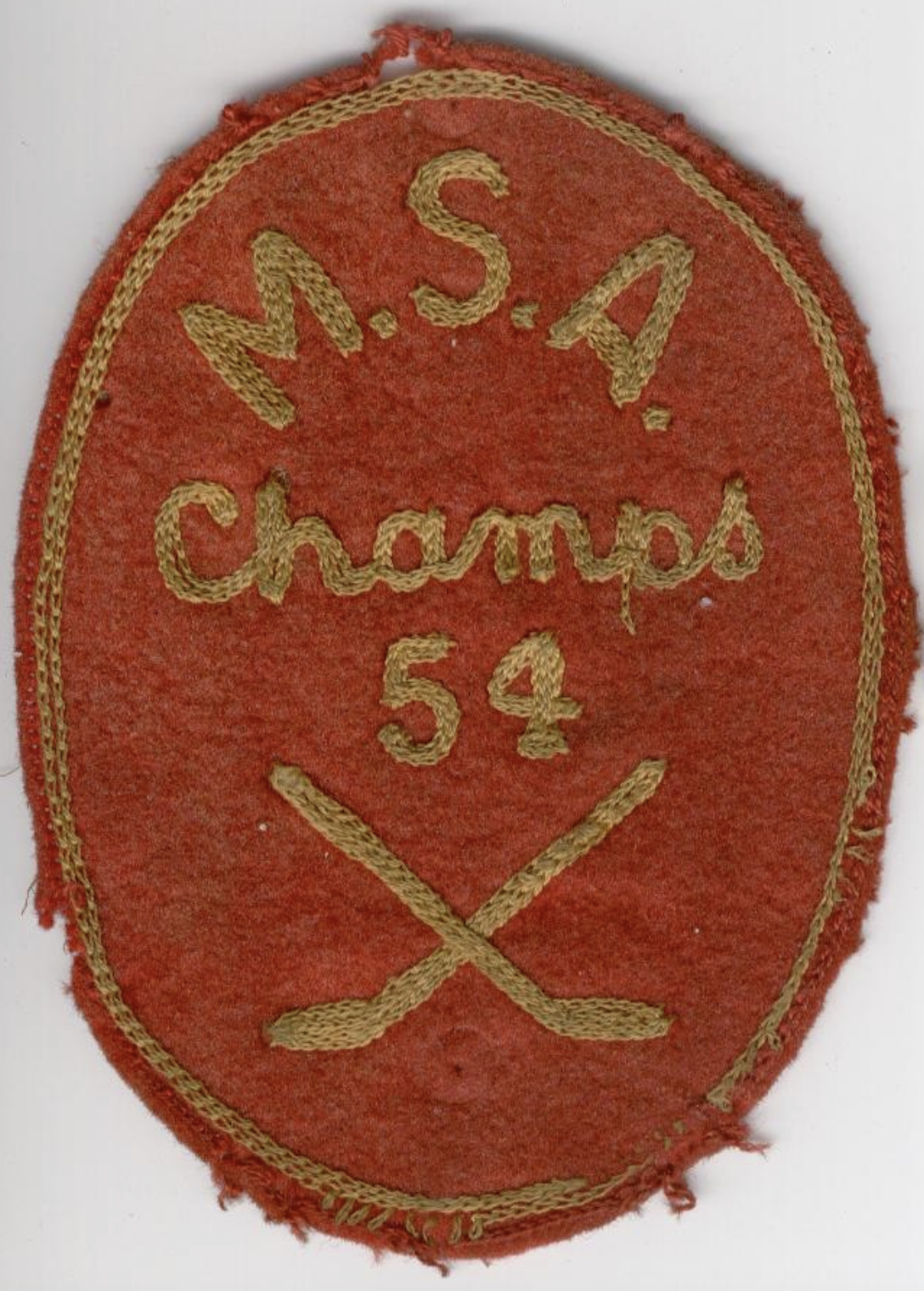
Maryland Scholastic Association Ice Hockey Champs 1954

Sam's early accomplishments in ice hockey included coaching the Calvert Hall College High School's varsity ice hockey team from 1954 to 1956. In 1954, Sam coached the Calvert Hall Cardinals to victory in the Maryland Scholastic Association championship.

Sam rekindled his hockey interests and involvement in 1962 with the construction of the Baltimore Civic Center and Baltimore gaining a franchise for the Baltimore Clippers in the American Hockey League. Sam returned to coaching and serving as president for the Baltimore Boys Hockey Program, later known as Baltimore Youth Hockey as his sons took up the sport. Sam was deeply involved in Baltimore area hockey, once coaching 4 different teams within the same season.

From 1968-71, Sam was player coach of the National Brewers ice hockey team and was playing full contact hockey at age 43.

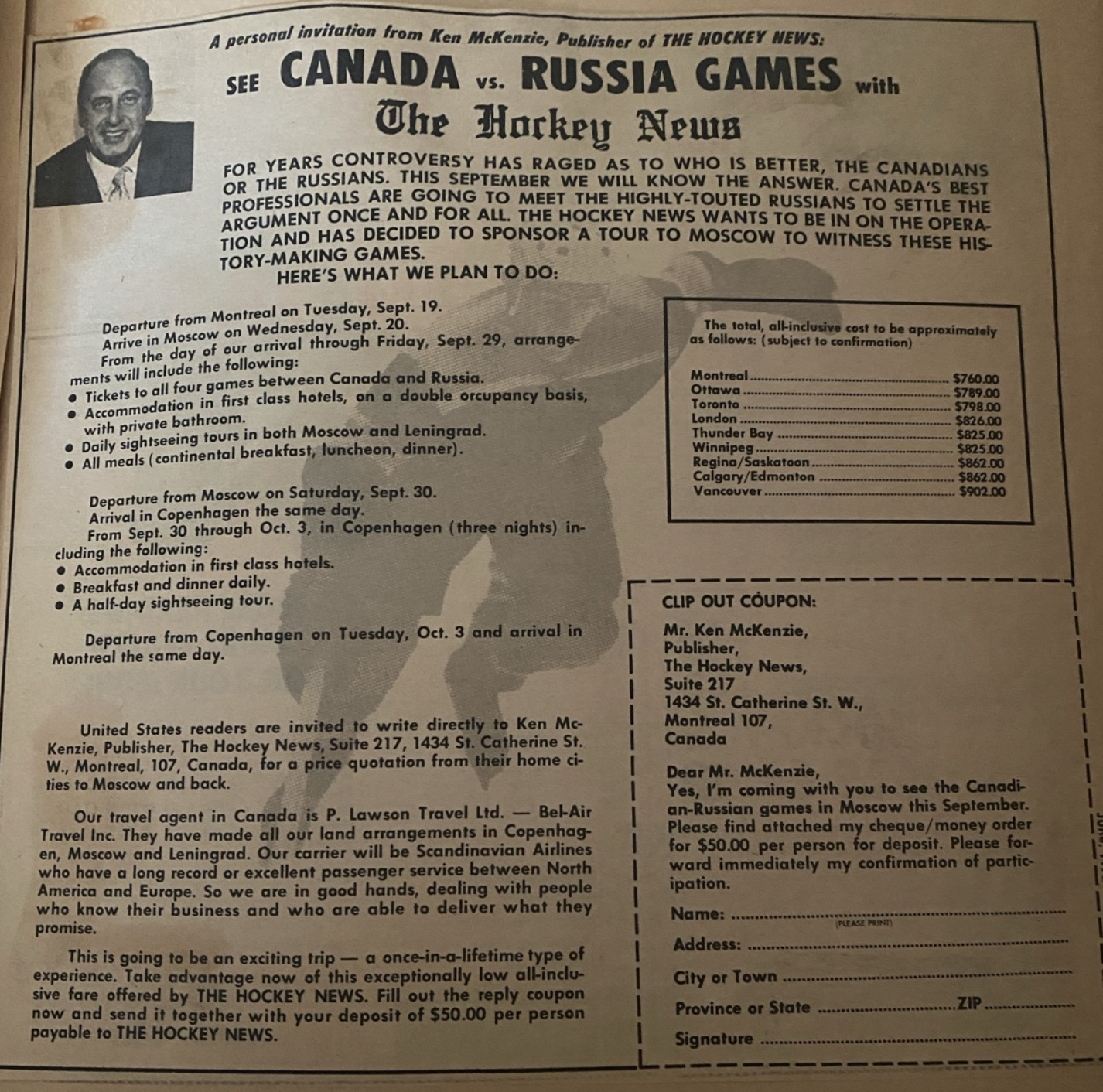
Canada - Russia Summit Series Announcement in The Hockey News.

When not coaching and playing hockey, Sam and his wife, Nancy, enjoyed watching it. They were two within a small group of Americans that were part of a 3,000-strong contingent of Canadians that journeyed to Moscow in September of 1972 to see the final 4 games of the legendary Canada – Soviet Union 8 game Summit Series.

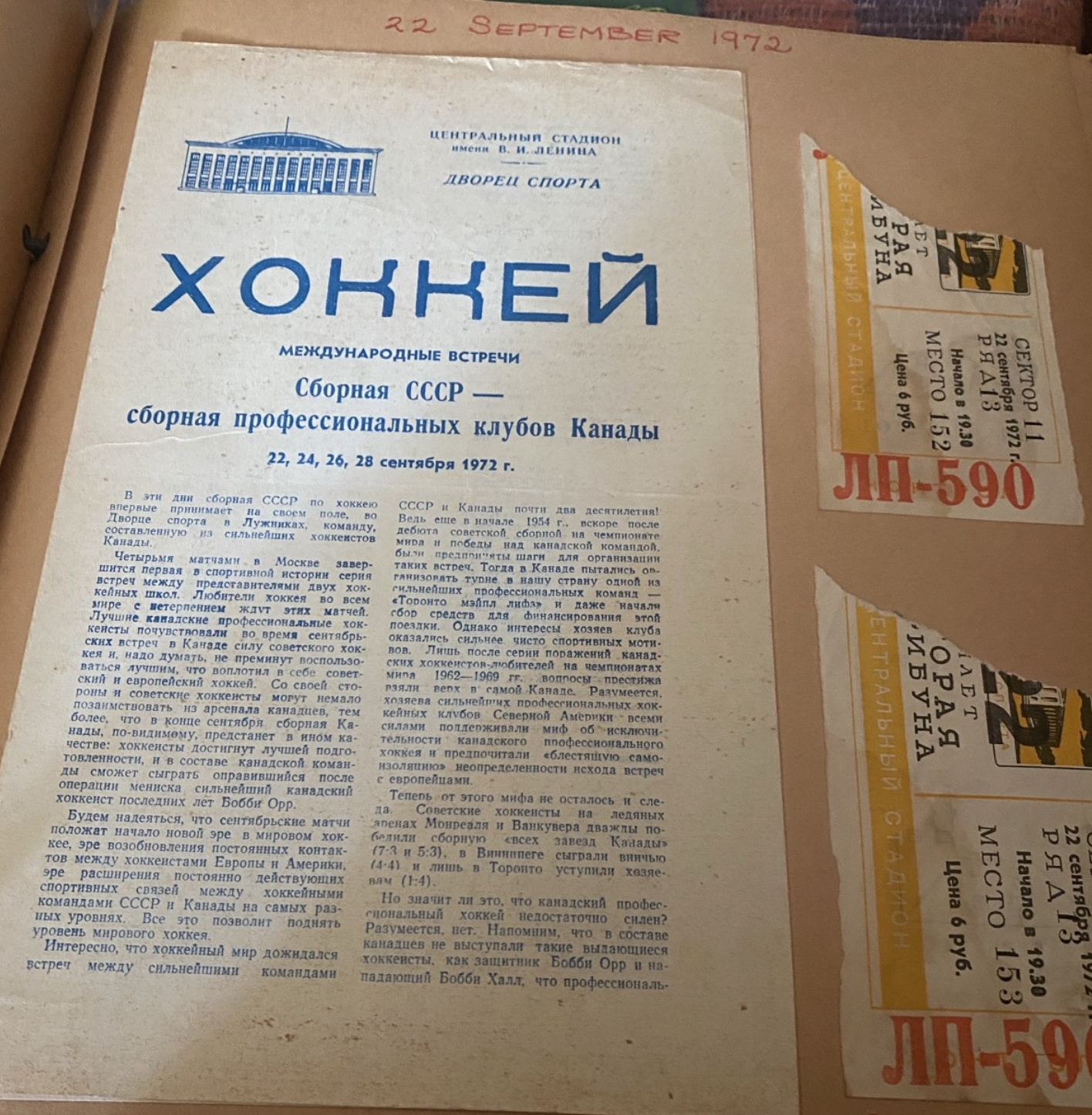
Game program and tickets to game 5 of Canada - USSR Series

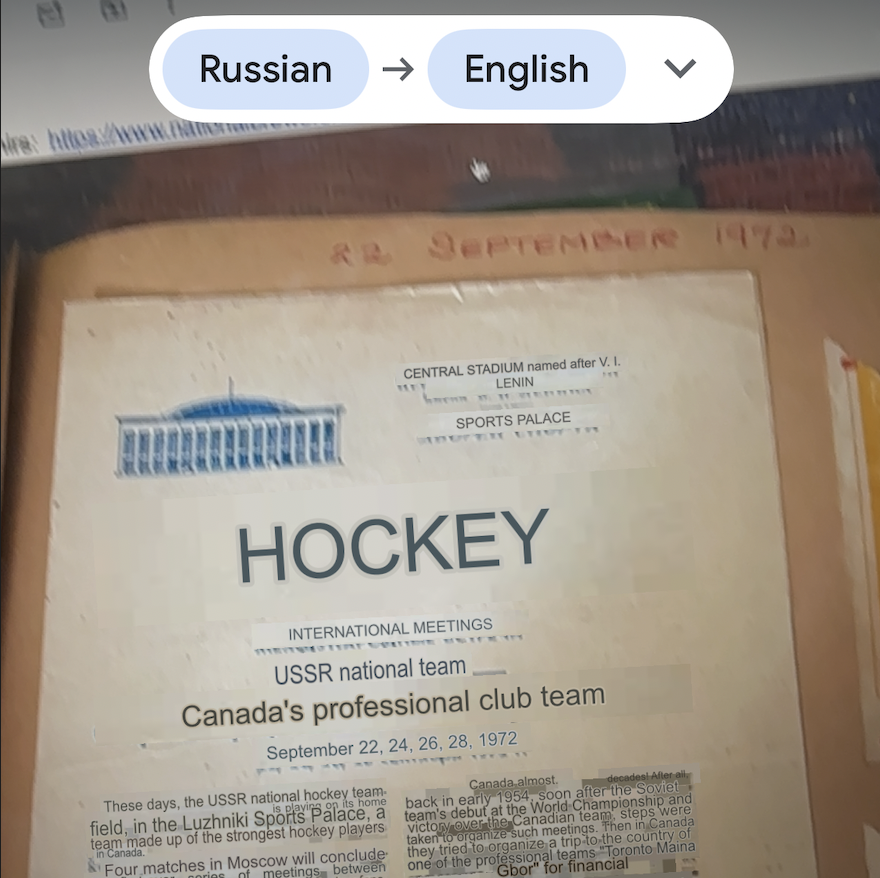
Translation for game program

After viewing games and practices in Moscow, Sam returned to Baltimore with Soviet-style drills for Brewers' practices. Sam continued coaching the Brewers club through the 1977-78 season.

Responding to growing interest in youth hockey in the Baltimore area, Sam operated a Summer Hockey School at Mount Pleasant Ice Arena. At age 72, Sam conducted 108 on-ice training sessions over ten weeks during the summer of 1998.

== Illness and Death ==
In his later years, Sam began suffering from a critically low iron count in his blood. As a result of toxic reactions from experimental intravenous iron infusion therapy, Sam died on November 4, 2014 in Salisbury, Maryland.
