= Ekkirala Krishnamacharya =

Indian writer and philosopher

- ఎక్కిరాల కృష్ణమాచార్య
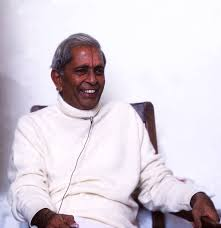
- Born: 11 August 1926; Bapatla, Guntur district, Madras Presidency, India (now in Andhra Pradesh)
- Died: 17 March 1984 (aged 57)
- Other name: Master EK
- Education: Ph.D in Telugu literature
- Occupations: University lecturer, spiritual guru, writer
- Spouse: Appamma
- Relatives: Ekkirala Bharadwaja (younger brother)

Ekkirala Krishnamacharya (11 August 1926 – 17 March 1984) was an Indian spiritual guru, university lecturer, homeopathy practitioner, and writer from Andhra Pradesh. He is also called as Master E.K. by his disciples. Born in a family of Vedic scholar, he completed his education in literature, and worked as a lecturer in Andhra University. He also used to practice homeopathy and established over 100 free dispensaries to serve the poor. He was the founder of the World Teacher Trust in 1971.

== Biography ==
Krishnamacharya was born on 11 August 1926 in Bapatla, Madras Presidency of India (now in Andhra Pradesh). His father Ekkirala Ananthacharya was a Vedic scholar, and Ayurvedic doctor. His mother Bucchamma was a house wife. He is the eldest son among four children. He lost his mother when he was 13 years old. He had three younger brothers. His father did not send any of his children to formal school. He felt modern education limit their creative potential and make them automatons.

Krishnamacharya studied vedas and their intricacies under the guidance of his father. At the age of just five years, he was able to convince some members of Brahma samaj, who visited their father, about the existence of god in the temples. He used to write poetry from his childhood. His poetry got accolades from the Jnanpith Award winning Telugu poet Viswanatha Satyanarayana. After his school education, he got admitted into a university for postgraduate studies in literature. He used to rigorously practice Gayatri Mantra on weekends when there were no classes.

After his collegiate education, Krishnamacharya was appointed as a lecturer of Telugu in a college in Guntur. He constantly had visions of a personality whenever he sits for chanting of Gayatri Mantra. He later found him to be Master C. V. V. whom he accepted as his spiritual Guru.

Krishnamacharya established many spiritual centers in India, and western Europe. He also started schools, and homeopathic dispensaries in India where the poor is treated for free. He has also inspired his followers to serve the needy. He had disciples from India and other countries as well.

Krishnamacharya started the Theosophy related World Teacher Trust (WTT) on 18 November 1971 in Visakhapatnam. WTT combines ideas from Theosophical society related to the ideas of Alice Bailey with a strong emphasis on homeopathic medicine. Within the group, he was known as "Master E. K." The WTT was promoted in Europe by Luc Jouret and his wife Christine Pertué, though they later fell out of contact with the organization following Krishnamacharya's death.
