= Whittemore Gang =

- Founded: April 11, 1924
- Founded by: Richard Reese Whittemore
- Founding location: Baltimore, Maryland
- Years active: 1924-1926
- Territory: Mid-Atlantic and Eastern United States
- Membership (est.): 9
- Criminal activities: Armed robbery

The Whittemore Gang (April 11, 1924 – March 19, 1926) was a group of bank robbers active in the Mid-Atlantic and Eastern United States during the mid-1920s. Led by Richard Reese Whittemore (September 8, 1901 - August 13, 1926), the gang, including his wife Margaret (March 2, 1903 - April 13, 1993), went on a year-long crime spree committing payroll, bank and jewelry robberies in Maryland and New York before their capture in 1926.

== History ==
=== Early years in Maryland ===
Richard Whittemore, a longtime career criminal, escaped from the Maryland state penitentiary on February 20, 1925, after killing prison guard Robert Holtman. He reunited with his wife Margaret Whittemore, known as Tiger Lil and the Tiger Girl, and began recruiting a team of stick up artists and hold up men such as Bernard Mortillaro, Pasquale Chicarelli, Joseph Ross, Morris "Shuffles" Goldberg, Leopold Gilden, Anthony Paladino and brothers Jake and Leon Kraemer. Whittemore and his gang would then commit a series of bank robberies in two states during a 12-month period.

The gang committed its first armed robbery, only four days after Whittemore's prison escape, when they ambushed a Western Maryland Dairy payroll shipment in Baltimore. The driver and a guard were shot during the robbery and the gang escaped with $16,034 in cash. Three weeks later, the gang robbed Baltimore bank messenger J. Wahl Holtzman of $8,792 in broad daylight, beating him unconscious and then stealing the money he was carrying.

=== Arrival in New York ===
These robberies soon attracted the attention of authorities and Whittemore decided to move the gang to New York City where they could start again. On April 5, 1925, they robbed the Metro Sacks jewelry store on West 125 Street taking an estimated $16,000 in cash and precious stones. On May 9, the gang held up Manhattan jeweler Jacques Ross on Grand Street and took $25,000 in diamonds from him. A month later, they also hit Buffalo when, on June 1, they raided the Levy Jewelry Company and stole $50,000 worth of jewelry.

Weeks later, they were back in Manhattan where they robbed Stanley's jewelry shop on July 16 escaping with another $50,000 in jewelry. On September 14, the gang stole a similar amount at David Brick's jewelry store on Third Avenue. On October 5, they stole an estimated $30,000 from Linherr's jewelry store on Sixth Avenue and, two weeks later, robbed salesman John Sandford, employed by Laster & Son, as he parked his car on Broadway. Whittemore and his gang got away with $25,000 worth of watches and jewelry.

=== Buffalo hijacking and assaulting Spike Kinney ===
On October 29, 1925, six unidentified gunmen hijacked an armored truck en route to the U.S. Federal Reserve. Once stopping the truck, they killed both the driver and guard then escaped with $93,000 in cash. The robbery made headlines across the country as Harry Harris and his gang were initially identified by witnesses. Eventually Whittemore was arrested on unrelated charges and became the prime suspect in this robbery. Dutch Andersonn was also named as a possible suspect, but the case eventually remained unsolved.

Although it is unclear whether the Whittemore Gang was responsible for the Buffalo robbery, their leader made the news that same month for altogether different reasons when Whittemore allegedly attempted to kill bootlegger Edwin Spike Kinney. Whittemore confronted Kinney at a Baltimore roadhouse on Halloween, accusing him of having an affair with his wife Margaret, and shot him. Kinney later identified Whittemore as his assailant to police.

=== Return to New York ===
By the end of the year, the Whittemore Gang had returned to New York. On December 2, 1925, they stole $75,000 in diamonds from M.G. Ernest's jewelry store on Columbus Avenue. Three weeks later, they held up Nassau Street jeweler Folmer Prip for an estimated $10,000. On December 26, three days after their latest robbery, gang member Joe Ross was found shot to death in Elizabethtown, New Jersey in what is still an unsolved gangland slaying.

The gang rested up for the next week or two before striking again. On January 11, 1926, they robbed Belgian diamond merchants Albert Goudris and Emanuel Veerman on West 48th Street in Manhattan. This was their most successful haul yet, having gotten $175,000 in gems, however this was also to be their last robbery. They spent the next nine weeks celebrating, spending much of their loot, According to federal watchdog Harry Anslinger, many, if not all, of the gang were using heroin by this time. Their drug use may have been the contributing factor for their capture when the New York Police Department were able to arrest eight of the surviving gang members on March 19, 1926, without firing a shot.

=== Imprisonment and execution ===
Whittemore was first tried in Buffalo for the armored car hijacking but the trial ended in a hung jury on April 27, 1926, and a mistrial was declared. Although the charges were dropped, Whittemore was extradited to Maryland where he was charged with the murder of prison guard Robert Holtman. He was convicted on May 21, condemned to death on June 10, and hanged on Friday, August 13, 1926. Two other members of the gang, the Kraemer brothers, were convicted on robbery charges and sentenced to 40 years each in a New York prison. Margaret Whittemore was arrested but never convicted for her roles in any of the crimes. She died at age 90 on April 13, 1993.

== Notes ==
- Winifred Black, Fremont Older (1928). Dope the Story of the Living Dead.
- Jerome Hall. Theft, law, and society.
