= August Novelization =

The August Novelization (Polish: Nowela sierpniowa) of 2 August 1926 was a set of amendments to the 1921 March Constitution of Poland.

These amendments were proposed and adopted by national plebiscite after Józef Piłsudski took power in the May Coup.

There were four main clauses in the amendments.

- The President may dismiss the Sejm (parliament) and the Senate.
- The President may issue acts (rozporządzenia) having statutory power with the approval of the Sejm.
- The Sejm may not dissolve itself.
- If the Sejm cannot agree on the state budget, the budget may be passed by the government.
