= March Constitution (Poland) =

First constitution of the Second Polish Republic, adopted in 1921

Overview
- Original title: Ustawa z dnia 17 marca 1921 roku Konstytucja Rzeczypospolitej Polskiej
- Jurisdiction: Republic of Poland
- Created: March 19, 1921; 105 years ago
- Date effective: June 1, 1921
- Repealed: April 24, 1935; 90 years ago

The Second Polish Republic adopted the March Constitution on 17 March 1921, after ousting the occupation of the German/Prussian forces in the 1918 Greater Poland Uprising, and avoiding conquest by the Soviets in the 1920 Polish-Soviet War. The Constitution, based on the Constitution of the Third French Republic, was regarded as very democratic. Among others, it expressly ruled out discrimination on racial or religious grounds. It also abolished all royal titles and state privileges affecting the nobility of Poland, and banned the use of blazons.

It was partially adjusted by the 1926 August Novelization, and superseded by the Polish Constitution of 1935 (April Constitution).
