= Robert Merlini =

Robert Merlini (born Robert Robbins; 1926–1964) was an Australian illusionist, stage performer and television performer. He was the first Australian magician to appear on television and was a collector of magic books and memorabilia.

== Early life ==
He was born in Sydney on 21 August 1926, to Herbert Robbins and Mary Anne Elizabeth (Polly) Robbins. At the age of 14 he was the youngest magician to perform at the Tivoli Theatre in Sydney.

== Career ==
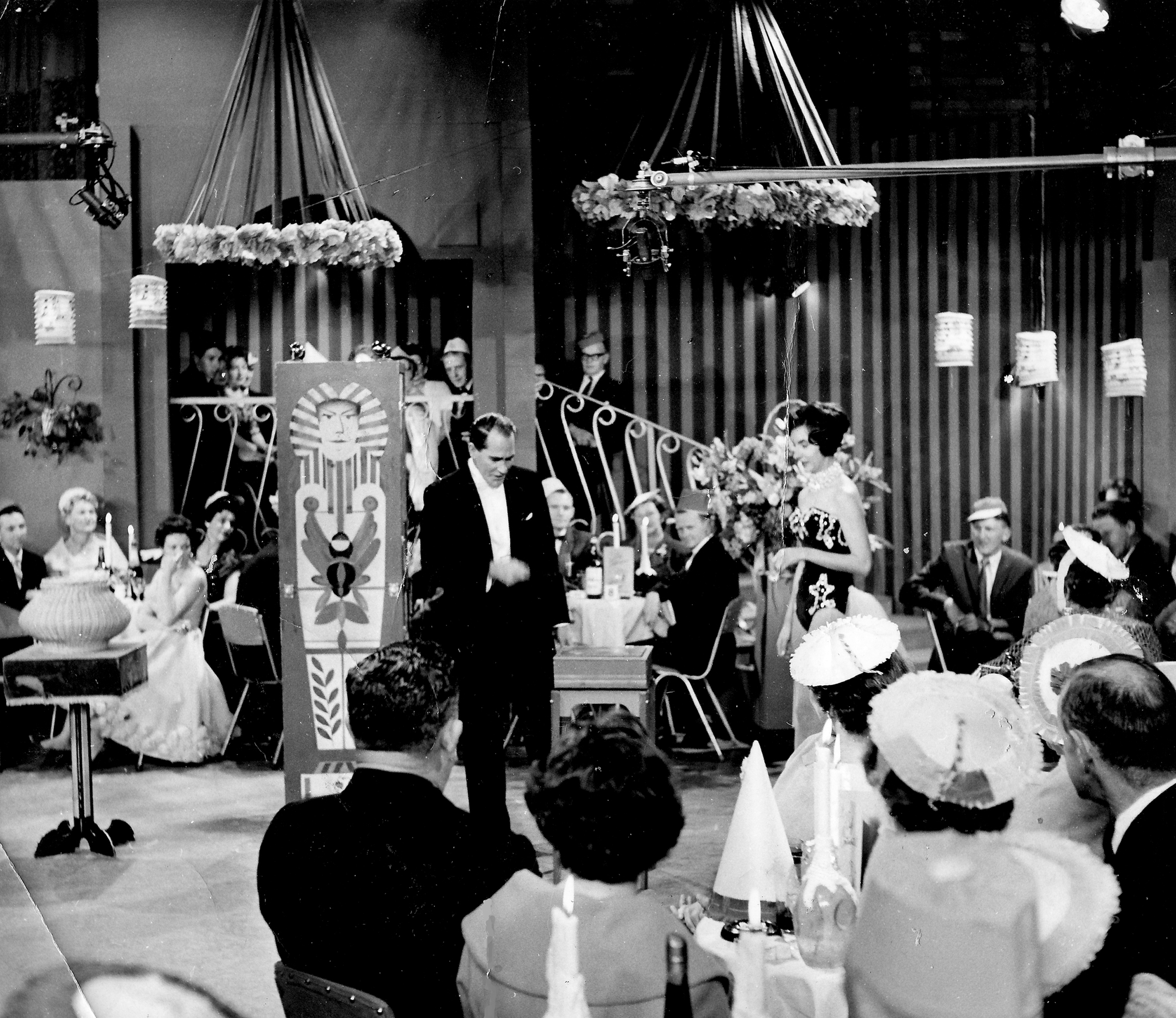
Robert Merlini performing a magic show.

Robbins used the stage name of ‘Robert Merlini’. Merlini studied with another notable Australian magician, The Great Levante (Leslie George Cole), a Gold Star awarded performer and fellow of the Academy of Magical Arts in Hollywood. Performances of magic have a long history in Australia, with the first magic shows taking place on the gold fields.

Robbins was in the Australian Occupation Forces in Japan when World War II ended and joined English performer Gracie Fields and her troupe entertaining the forces.

Using his stage name, Merlini corresponded with Oscar Oswald the magic dealer and editor of Magical Digest . Throughout his career Merlini built a substantial collection of more than 900 books and pamphlets about magic dating from 1799 to 1962 building on an extensive collection of texts relating to magic which he acquired from The Great Levante in the early 1960s. Now known as the Robbins Collection of Stage Magic, the collection "contains around 900 books, trade catalogues, pamphlets, posters and serials".

Appearing as Merlini, Robbins was the first hypnotist to perform live on Australian television in 1957. He appeared in television programs including Cafe Continental, Review 61 and Review 62 and made several appearances on In Melbourne Tonight with Graham Kennedy.

== Personal life ==
Robbins was married to Margaret Robbins, and they had three children, Denise, David and Graham. Robbins died on 8 January 1964, aged 37.
