= Ekkirala Bharadwaja =

Indian Hindu monk (1938–1989)

- Born: October 30, 1938; Bapatla, Madras Presidency, British India (now in Andhra Pradesh)
- Died: April 12, 1989 (aged 50); Ongole, Andhra Pradesh
- Education: Post graduate in English literature
- Occupations: Spiritual Guru, English lecturer
- Spouse: Ekkirala Alivelumangamma
- Children: Adidam Vedavathi, Ekkirala Dwarakanath Jnaneswar
- Parents: Ekkirala Ananthacharya (father); Ekkirala Buchimamba (mother)

Ekkirala Bharadwaj (30 October 1938 – 12 April 1989), was an Indian who authored many Hindu spiritual books, primarily on the life and worship of Shirdi Sai Baba and Sri Dattatreya. He is the fourth son of Ekkirala Ananthacharya and Buchamma. Ekkirala Bharadwaj written Telugu-language book Sri Sai Leelamrutham is a notable book (Parayana Grandam). Ekkirala Bharadwaja later translated the book to English with the name Sai Baba The Master. He also wrote "Sri Guru Charitra" in English and Telugu. He also has written many spiritual books in Telugu and English.

== Biography ==
Ekkirala Bharadwaja was born at Bapatla, a town in Guntur district of the Indian state of Andhra Pradesh and was a post-graduate in English literature. He completed the Indian Administrative Service and he rejected posting orders(Himachal Pradesh). He got profound spiritual experience on 9th Feb 1963 at the Samadhi Mandir of Sai Baba of Shirdi, thereafter becoming a lecturer of English literature because that gave him an opportunity to spread his master's teachings.

As a young child, Bharadwaja reportedly showed curiosity and strong determination. Bharadwaja took his matriculation exam directly at the age of 12 years at Varanasi. By the time he had attained 19 years, he was a post-graduate in English Literature and started teaching at the Sarma Degree College in Ongole, a town in Andhra Pradesh. Once, with the objective of confirming to himself that he could complete any job that he set for himself, however difficult, Ekkirala Bharadwaja took up his brother's challenge to clear the UPSC examinations. He cleared the examination after approximately 3 months of preparation. However, he gave up the resulting appointment as it did not align with his personal goals.

The origin of Ekkirala Bharadwaja's theistic outlook of life however had its beginning many years before. His quest for truth was instigated by the sudden demise of his beloved nephew at the very moment of Bharadwaja's Brahmopadesam during the sacred thread ceremony in 1955. The auspicious occasion had been selected by those who were stalwarts in such divine matters, the ceremony did not prevent the child's death, which brought about a significant transformation in Bharadwaja. In his own words, "…I became deeply atheistic; moreover, a spirit of quest dawned in me. I thought endlessly and deeply about the nature of life, the highest goal of life, about Atma-Anatma, the nature of birth and death, which lasted very strongly

After Bharadwaja’s stint as a Lecturer at the college of Ongole, he taught for a short while at the Viveka Vardhini evening college in Hyderabad and then moved to Bapatla College. Here too he resigned after a brief period and stayed at the ashram of the Mother of Jillelamudi for a year. Later, he moved to the Vidyanagar College at Vidyanagar.

Ekkirala Bharadwaja

As a lecturer, Ekkirala Bharadwaja would often incorporate life’s values and its guiding principles while explaining the subject often relating it to life values and spiritual teachings. Many students reportedly attended his discussions on spirituality and practiced spiritual discipline under his guidance.

"Sri Guru Bharadwaj Thapovanam" (14.031567210959647, 80.0299242449768) was actually the house that Acharya rented while working as an English Lecturer in the N B K R(Nedurumalli Bala Krishna Reddy) Science and Arts Degree College at Vidyanagar, Nellore District in 1970. The holy site which was later named as Thapovanam(తపోవనం). The Vidyanagar(రెండో షిర్డి) is a small village in Kota Mandal in SPSR Nellore (Sri Potti SreeRamulu Nellore) District of Andhra Pradesh State, India. Bharadwaja stayed at Thapovan for 15 years. The Thapovanam site also holds great significance for the devotees of Ekkirala Bharadawaja not only for the memories contained therein but also for the numerous saints that graced this house by their presence. so it was preserved as a monument. The holy book "Sri SaiLeelamrutham" and "Sri Gurucharitra" that is a "Parayana grandha" for millions today and has also been translated into several languages was finalized in this very little house. Many of his other works were also penned here.

Bharadwaja researched the lives and teachings of several saints, traveling extensively and personally contacting many of them. He insisted on the necessity of a Sadguru to direct devotees in their spiritual path. The culmination of all this is a series of books on Sai Baba and many other saints. He believed Sai Baba (Dattatreya incarnation) to be the matchless saint, a blend of all religions and the answer to all the questions of the present day and spirituality.

Ekkirala Bharadwaja left his physical body on 12 April 1989 at Ongole. His Sannidanam(Sri Dattatreya Parampara has to be called as Sannidanam) is in Ongole Sai baba temple.

== Institutions ==
Bharadwaja founded the Shirdi Sai Cultural Mission at Vidyanagar and the Sai Baba Mission in Ongole. He also founded a Telugu-language fortnightly publication, Sai Baba, that is now produced monthly and continues to spread his messages. The publication inspired the construction of several Sai Baba temples. His thoughts are now promoted by the Sri Master Universal Sai Trust & Acharya Bharadwaja Peace Foundation in Ongole, Andhra Pradesh.

== Works ==
Bharadwaja authored many books in Telugu and English. Some of his notable works are:

English

- Sai Baba the Master. Shirdi Sai Publications. 1978.
- The Life & Teachings of the Mother. Matrusri Publications. 1968.
- Sree Guru Charitra. Sai Baba Mission. 1987.
- Vision of Aryan Glory. Tirumala Tirupati Devasthanams. 1980.
- The Supreme Master: Shri Akkalkot Maharaj. Sree Gurupaduka Publications. 1994.
- The Life and Teachings of Jillellamudi Amma. Stone Hill Foundation Publishing Pvt. Limited. 2007. ISBN 978-8189658441.

Telugu

- Sri GuruCharitra
- Sri Saileelamruthamu
- Sri Pakalapati Guruvugari Charitra
- Vignana Veechikalu
- Sri Sainatha satvana Manjari
- Sri Sai Nitya Satya Vratham
- Edi Nijam
- Sri Swamy Samartha
- Sri Sainatha Prabodhamruthamu
- Avadhutha Sri Chirala Swamy Charitra
- Sri Guru Charitra Samhitayana
- Buddha Dhyana Hrudayam
- Sri Dattavatara Mahatmyamu
- And other spiritual books ( Nenu Darsinchina Mahatmulu)

== Legacy ==
American psychologist Dan Landis and Rosita D. Albert of University of Minnesota credits Ekkirala Bharadwaja for spreading the devotion towards Sai Baba of Shirdi in Andhra Pradesh and says, "Shiridi Sai is worshipped by Hindus and Muslims alike, and the Late E.Bharadwaja's effort to take his message to Andhra Pradesh definitely helped create a large following for Shiridi Sai in his state".

== Bibliography ==
- Ruhela, Satya Pal (2016). The Divine Grace of Sri Shirdi Sai Baba. Partridge Publishing. ISBN 9781482870718.
- Rigopoulos, Antonio (1993). The Life And Teachings of Sai Baba of Shirdi: The Conflicting Origins, Impacts, and Futures of the Community College. SUNY Press. ISBN 978-0791412671.
- Landis, Dan; Albert, Rosita D. (2012). Handbook of Ethnic Conflict: International Perspectives. Springer. ISBN 978-1461404477.
- Nanda, A. R (2011). The Eternal Sai Phenomenon. Sterling Publishers. ISBN 978-8120790247.
- Warren, Marianne (1999). Unravelling the Enigma Shirdi Sai Baba in the Light of Sufism. Sterling Publishers. ISBN 9788120721470.
