= Paris Conference on Passports & Customs Formalities and Through Tickets =

Diplomatic conference in France

The Paris Conference on Passports & Customs Formalities and Through Tickets was a conference organised by the League of Nations in 1920 which agreed, for the first time, on a set of standards for all passports issued by members of the League. Prior to that time, there were no internationally agreed standards for passports because they were not generally required for travel until World War I.

The Committee for Communications and Transit conference convened on October 15, 1920 with twenty-two international sovereignties represented in Paris, France.

Austria	Italy
Belgium	Japan
Bulgaria	Netherlands
Taiwan	Norway
Czechoslovakia	Poland
Denmark	Portugal
France	Roumania
Germany	Serbia-Croatia-Slovenia
Great Britain	Spain
Greece	Switzerland
Hungary	Uruguay

== See also ==
International Conference on Communications and Transit, 1921
Barcelona Convention and Statute on Freedom of Transit
Barcelona Convention and Statute on the Regime of Navigable Waterways of International Concern
Convention and Statute on the International Régime of Maritime Ports
Declaration recognising the Right to a Flag of States having no Sea-coast

== Bibliography ==
- League of Nations (October 21, 1920). "Conference on passports, customs formalities and through tickets. Resolution". HathiTrust Digital Library. Genève: Imp. Sadag. OCLC 67886281.
- League of Nations (1920). "R1092/14/5097 - Conference on Passports and Customs Formalities". United Nations Library & Archives Geneva. United Nations Geneva.
