= July 1926 =

Month of 1926

<<	July 1926					>>
Su	Mo	Tu	We	Th	Fr	Sa
				1	2	3
4	5	6	7	8	9	10
11	12	13	14	15	16	17
18	19	20	21	22	23	24
25	26	27	28	29	30	31

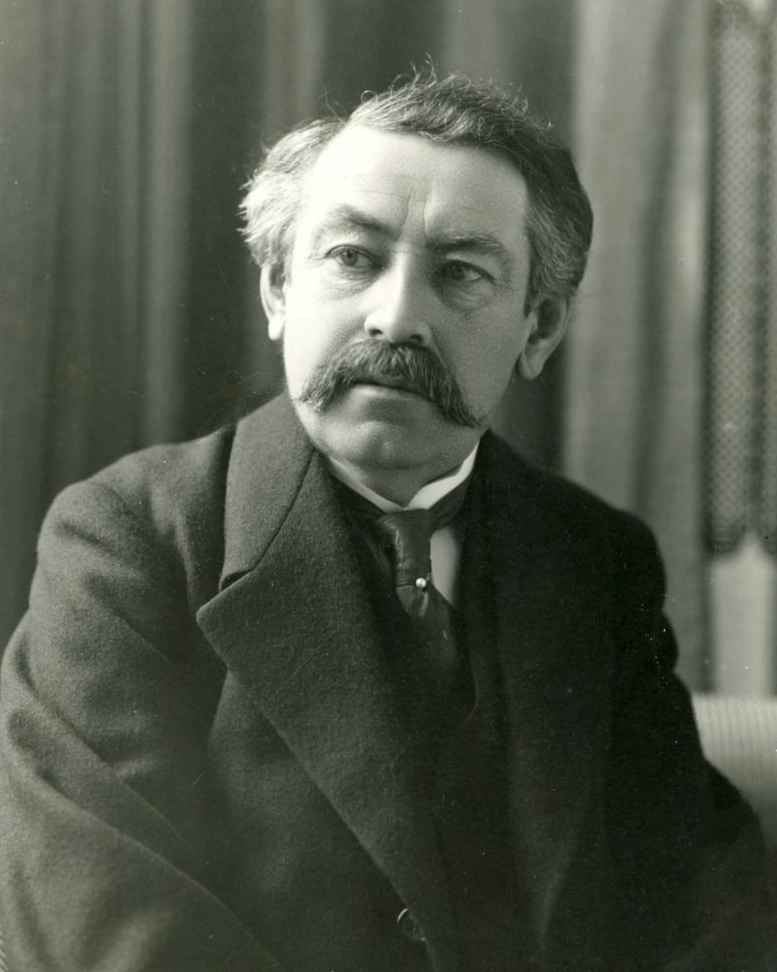
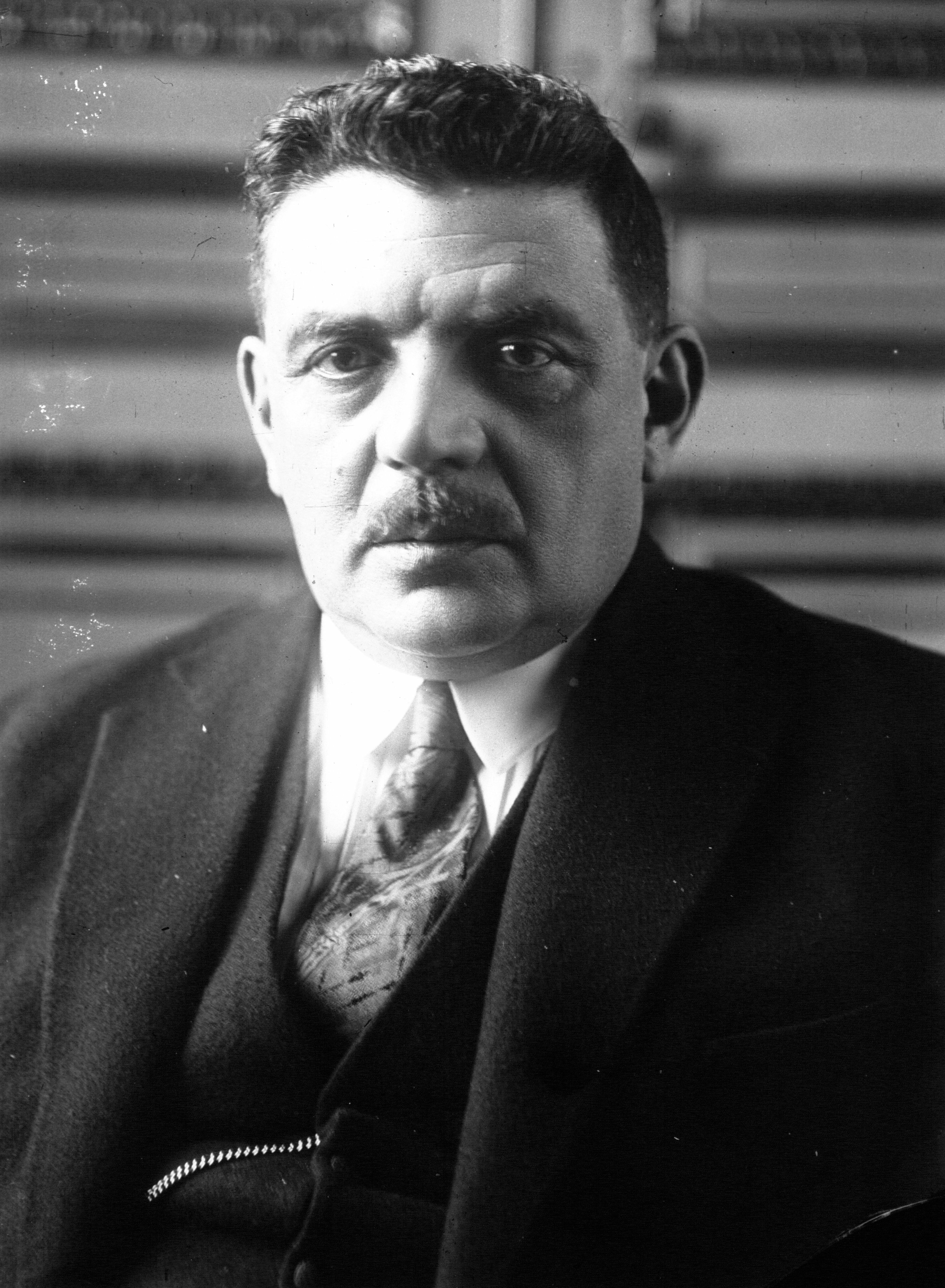
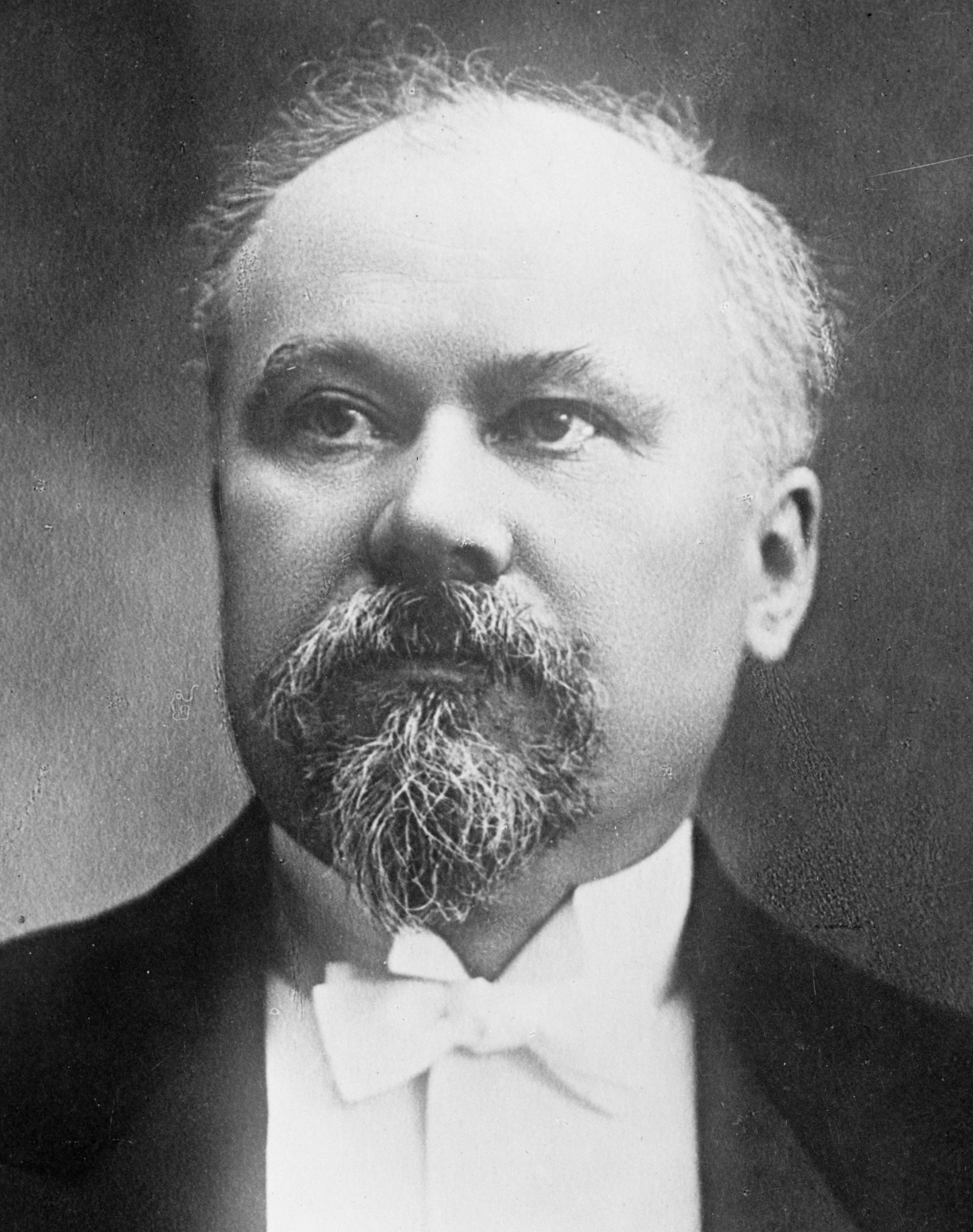
France's three prime ministers, Aristide Briand (to July 17), Édouard Herriot (July 20-23) and Raymond Poincaré (from July 23)

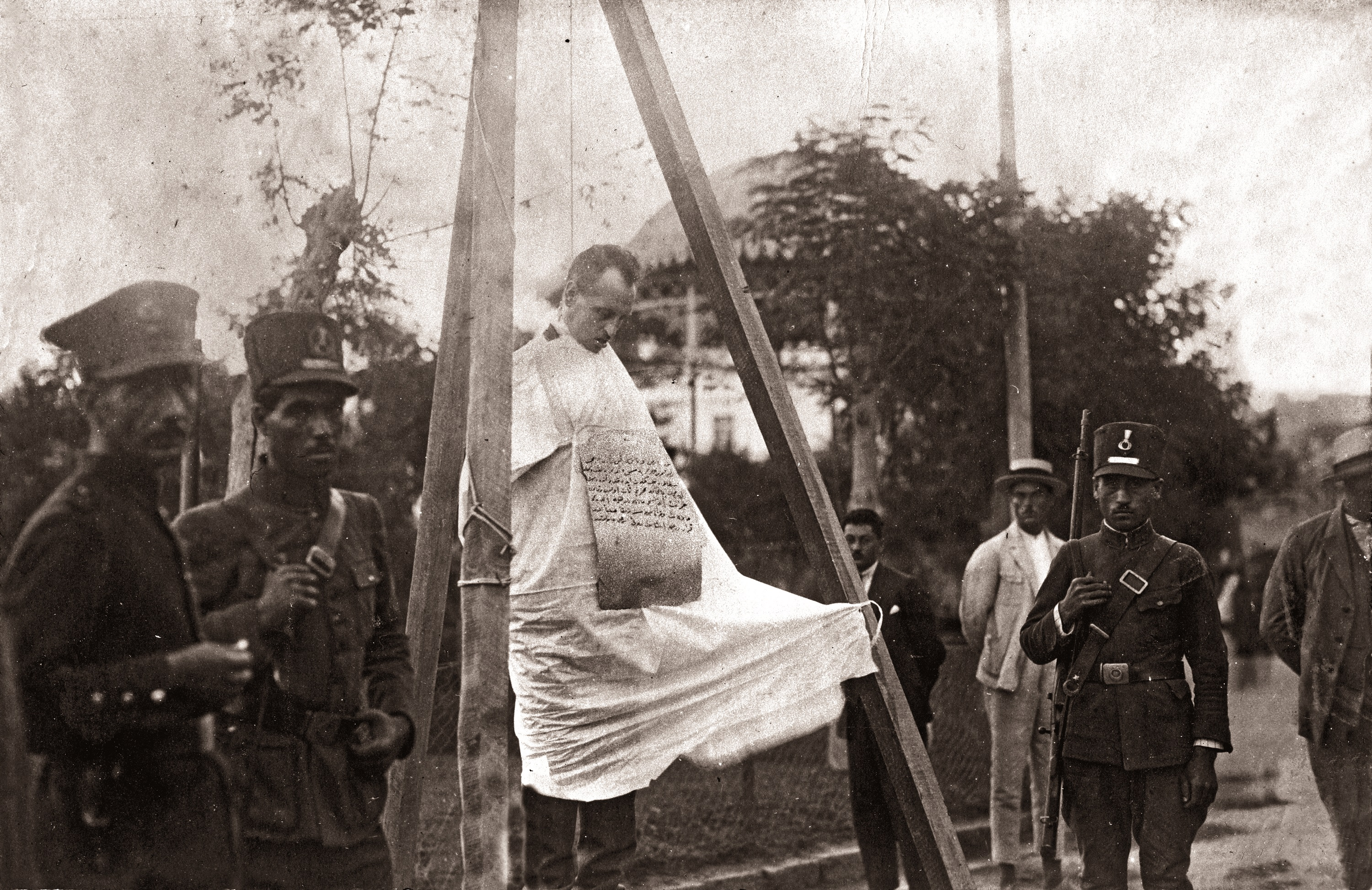
July 13, 1926: Turkish legislator Ziya Hursit becomes first of 15 accused coup leaders to be executed.

The following events occurred in July 1926:

== July 1, 1926 (Thursday) ==
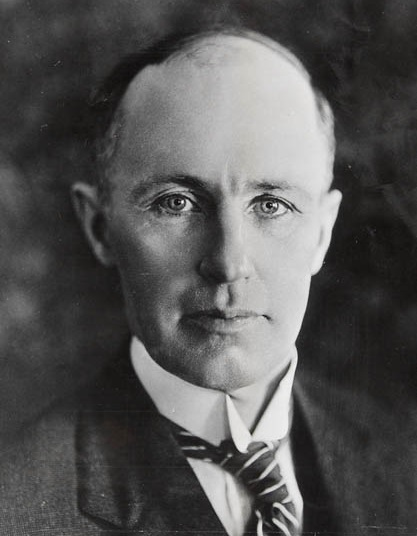
Prime Minister Meighen

- The two-day-old government of Canadian Prime Minister Arthur Meighen was defeated in Parliament by one vote, 96 to 95 on a motion challenging the legality of Meighen's attempt to circumvent normal Parliamentary procedure by assembling a Cabinet consisting exclusively of acting ministers without portfolio. The votes against Meighen's government included 14 of his fellow Conservatives. Though the vote was not strictly a motion of no confidence, Meighen accepted the result as such and asked the Governor-General to dissolve Parliament and schedule a new election.
- The Swedish Air Force (the Flygvapnet) was founded by a merger of the aviation units of Sweden's Army and Navy.
- The largest chain of grocery stores in the western United States was created by merger of the 322 stores of the Safeway chain, and the 673 stores of the Skaggs Companies, all of which had been purchased by stockbroker Charles E. Merrill, with the 995 stores to be under the Safeway brand.
- The world's longest suspension bridge up to that time, the 9,650 feet (2,940 m) long Delaware River Bridge linking Philadelphia to Camden, New Jersey, was opened three days before the celebration of the sesquicentennial of United States independence. At 1:00 in the afternoon, "three little girls" cut red, white and blue cords at the Philadelphia entrance and thousands of pedestrians began crossing the Delaware River from both sides. Pedestrian traffic closed at 7:00 and the motor vehicle traffic was allowed at midnight. The bridge would be renamed for Benjamin Franklin in 1955.
- The Government of Canada returned to the gold standard, and allowed its bank notes to be redeemed for gold to back its currency, after having chosen to abandon the standard on August 22, 1914. After the Great Depression, Canada abandoned the gold standard again on October 31, 1931.
- The town of Venice, Florida, was incorporated after Dr. Fred H. Albee, an orthopedic surgeon, had purchased 112 acres (45 ha) for development of the infrastructure and government buildings over a period of two years.
- Born:
  - Robert Fogel, American economist and laureate of the 1993 Nobel Memorial Prize in Economic Sciences; in New York City (d. 2013)
  - Howard Sachs, American biochemist and pioneer in neuroendocrinology who discovered a means of biosynthesis of the hormone vasopressin; in Brooklyn (d. 2011)
  - Carl Hahn, German auto executive who served as Chairman of Volkswagen AG from 1982 to 1998; in Chemnitz (d. 2023)
  - Hans Werner Henze, German composer for opera and theatre (including König Hirsch, Elegy for Young Lovers, Venus und Adonis), and ballets, as well as 10 symphonies for orchestras; in Gütersloh, Westphalia (d. 2012)
- Died: Alexander del Mar, 89, the first Director of the Bureau of Statistics at the U.S. Treasury Department

== July 2, 1926 (Friday) ==
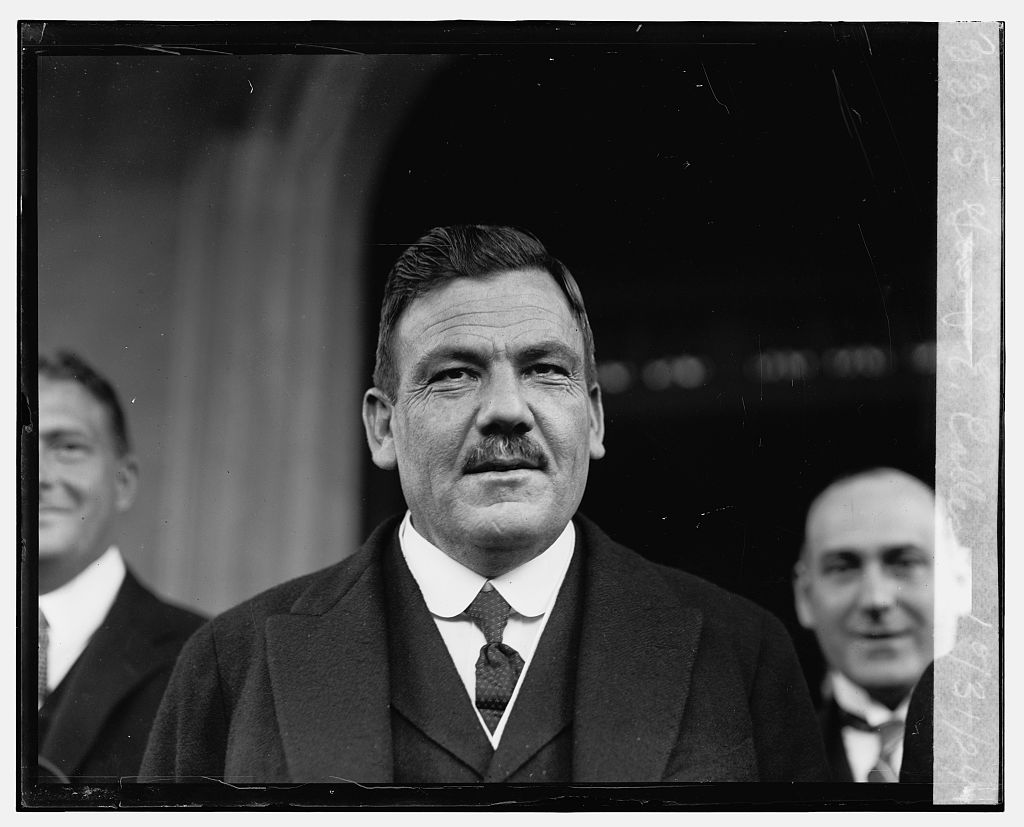
President Calles

- President Plutarco Elías Calles of Mexico published the Calles Law, effective July 31, which banned religious education, foreign priests and political commentary in religious publications. Additionally, all church property was to become government property and worship could only be conducted inside of churches and under the supervision of local officials.
- At Prime Minister Meighen's request following the vote of no confidence, Canada's Governor General Julian Byng, dissolved Parliament. and scheduled new elections for the House of Commons and the Canadian Senate to take place on September 14.
- The United States Army Air Corps (USAAC), forerunner of the United States Air Force (USAF), was established as an expansion of the United States Army Air Service that had been created on May 24, 1918. Congress declined to give the U.S. Army's aerial warfare branch the same autonomy that applied to the United States Marine Corps.
- Jean Borotra of France defeated Howard Kinsey of the United States in straight sets (8–6, 6–1, 6–3) to win the men's championship at Wimbledon, one of the four "Grand Slam" events in tennis.
- The U.S. Congress created the Distinguished Flying Cross, modeled after the British honor created in 1918 for members of all U.S. armed services "single acts of heroism or extraordinary achievement while participating in aerial flight.
- Born:
  - Yoshihisa Okumura, Japanese electronics engineer whose 1968 study of urban and rural environments determined the Okumura model, the international standards for placement and height of mobile phone cell towers, and set the 800 megahertz band as the most efficient frequency for mobile phones; in Kanazawa City, Isikawa Prefecture (d. 2023)
  - Lilly Kahil, Swiss-born French archaeologist who created the Lexicon Iconographicum Mythologiae Classicae encyclopedia of Etruscan, Greek and Roman mythology; in Zurich (d. 2002)
  - Morag Beaton, Scottish-born Australian opera soprano; in Edinburgh (d. 2010)
- Died: Émile Coué, 79, French psychologist known for the "Coué Method" of self-improvement, and coiner of the mantra "Tous les jours à tous points de vue je vais de mieux en mieux", which has been translated in English-speaking nations as "Every day, in every way, I'm getting better and better."

== July 3, 1926 (Saturday) ==
- Nine days after an attempted coup d'état against the government of Prime Minister Miguel Primo de Rivera, King Alfonso XIII of Spain issued a royal decree giving Primo de Rivera discretionary powers to impose "sanctions that are within his powers", including banishments and deportations that the premier deemed necessary, "whatever their number and the quality of the persons who deserve it", based on the good of the country. The King also provided that, to the extent that an act was not within Primo de Rivera's powers, the premier could ask King Alfonso XIII for an exception.
- Kitty McKane Godfree of Britain defeated Lili de Alvarez of Spain, 6–3 in the tiebreaking set (after she won the first 6–2, and Alvarez the second, 6–4) to win the women's championship at Wimbledon.
- Sammy Mandell won the world lightweight boxing championship, outpointing defending champion Rocky Kansas in 10 rounds at an outdoor bout at Chicago's Comiskey Park. The match was fought before a crowd of 15,000 boxing fans during a drizzling rain.
- Born:
  - Gregory Freiman, Russian-born Israeli mathematician known for Freiman's theorem; in Kazan, Tatar ASSR, Russian SFSR, Soviet Union (d.2024)
  - Evelyn Anthony (pen name for Evelyn Ward-Thomas), British novelist known for The Tamarind Seed; in Lambeth, London (d.2018)

== July 4, 1926 (Sunday) ==
- Torrential rains began falling in Germany at noon, flooding the town of Woltersdorf (where 14 people, almost all women, drowned) and killing 17 others in other parts of the nation.
- The Nazi Party staged its 2nd Party Congress in Weimar. The Grossdeutsche Jugendbewegung (Greater German Youth Movement) was rebranded Hitler Jugend Bund der deutschen Arbeiterjugend (Hitler Youth League of German Worker Youth), commonly referred to as the Hitler Youth.
- The Sesquicentennial of the United States was celebrated to commemorate the 150th anniversary of the signing of the Declaration of Independence and the founding of the United States. A violent storm struck the city during and damaged the Sesquicentennial Exposition, particularly the Palace of Agriculture, where water accumulated on the building roof and workmen cut holes directly over the exhibit for the U.S. state of Maryland, damaging it with a rush of water.
- Poland chose to honour this sesquicentennial by collecting signatures for the Polish Declarations of Admiration and Friendship for the United States. This collection of 111 volumes of signatures and greetings would be presented eight months later to U.S. President Calvin Coolidge to acknowledge American participation and aid to Poland during World War I, with submissions from nearly one-sixth of the population of Poland as it then existed, including those of approximately 5.5 million school children.
- Knoebels Amusement Resort, the largest amusement park in the U.S. to have no admission fee (with rides paid for individually) opened in Elysburg, Pennsylvania on the U.S. sesquicentennial day with a large swimming pool and its first mechanical ride (a steam-powered carousel)
- A group of 21 Mexican prisoners at the Blue Ridge State Prison Farm, in Blue Ridge, Texas in Fort Bend County, near Houston, escaped by sawing their way through the main building of the facility. The remaining 32 chose to remain in the prison.
- Born:
  - Alfredo Di Stéfano, Argentine-born Spanish footballer and star of Real Madrid FC, as well as having 39 caps for the Spain national team, as well as 6 for Argentina and 4 for Colombia; in Buenos Aires (d. 2014)
  - Mary Stuart (stage name for Mary Stuart Houchins; American TV actress known for her uninterrupted 35 years on the soap opera Search for Tomorrow (as "Joanne Gardner") for its entire run, from 1951 to 1986; in Miami (d. 2002)
  - Amos Elon, Austrian-born Israeli journalist and author; as Heinrich Sternbach in Vienna (d. 2009)
  - Veena Kumari (stage name for Tajour Sultana), Indian film actress and co-star with Ashok Kumar in Humayun, Najma and Afsana; in Balochistan Agency, British India; in Quetta (now part of Pakistan) (d.2024)
  - Katherine Bowes Lyon, British special needs cousin of Queen Elizabeth II of the United Kingdom, institutionalized at Royal Earlswood Hospital from 1941 (with her sister Nerissa) until her death in 2014; in Chelsea, London
- Died: Amy Ella Blanchard, 72, American writer of children's literature, known for the Four Corners six-book series (from 1907 to 1914) and the four-book A Dear Little Girl series from 1910 to 1913), died of a stroke (apoplexy) at her desk while writing a poem.

== July 5, 1926 (Monday) ==
- In a circular letter for worldwide distribution, Pope Pius XI designated August 1, the feast day of St. Peter ad Vincula, as a day of special prayers for "the deliverance of Mexican Catholics from persecution and for pardon for their persecutors."
- Monticello, which had been the home of Thomas Jefferson at the time he had written the U.S. Declaration of Independence, was formally dedicated to the American government after having been purchased for $500,000 from the estate of its owner, Jefferson Levy, with funds raised by private donations. The event came 100 years and a day after Jefferson's death on July 4, 1826, and 150 years and a day after American independence.
- An earthquake killed at least 101 people in Fort De Kock in the Dutch East Indies (now Bukittinggi in Indonesia) on the island of Sumatra, exactly one week after a June 28 Indonesian earthquake had killed 354 people.
- Because July 4 had fallen on a Sunday, U.S. President Calvin Coolidge gave his nationally broadcast sesquicentennial address the day after the 150th anniversary of U.S. independence.
- The wreckage of the submarine USS S-51, which had sunk on September 25 with the loss of 33 of its 36 crew, was raised off of the coast of Block Island near the U.S. state of Rhode Island. The U.S. Navy minesweeper USS Falcon brought up the craft, which contained the bodies of 25 of the 33 men killed. A previous attempt on June 22, 1926, brought S-51 to the surface but the vessel broke loose of the salvaging lines.
- In an address in Philadelphia to the first World Conference on Narcotic Education, Gerhard Kuhne, Chief of the Bureau of Criminal Identifications of New York City, surprised the delegates by declaring "You might as well try to influence the tides of the ocean as to argue with a drug addict when he is full of dope. Drug addicts can't be cured, and the only way to handle the situation is to kill 'em off or let them die off."
- Born:
  - Ivo Pitanguy, Brazilian plastic surgeon and pioneer in reconstructive surgery; in Belo Horizonte, Minas Gerais state (d. 2016)
  - Salvador Jorge Blanco, President of the Dominican Republic from 1982 to 1986; in Santiago de los Caballeros (d. 2010)
  - Bloeme Evers-Emden, Netherlands child psychologist and Holocaust survivor, known for her studies of the "hidden children"; in Amsterdam (d. 2016)

== July 6, 1926 (Tuesday) ==
- The first Elektrichka commuter train, an electrically powered railway mass transportation system popular in Russia, Eastern Europe and the other republics of the former Soviet Union, was inaugurated. The initial service was in the Azerbaijani SSR for travel on a line between the Azerbaijan capital, Baku and a suburb, Sabuncu.
- Canadian lawyer and inventor Edward R. McDonald received U.S. Patent No. 1,591,639 for his creation of "Crossword Game", more than four years before U.S. architect Alfred Mosher Butts created "Criss-Crosswords", which would be marketed in 1948 as Scrabble.

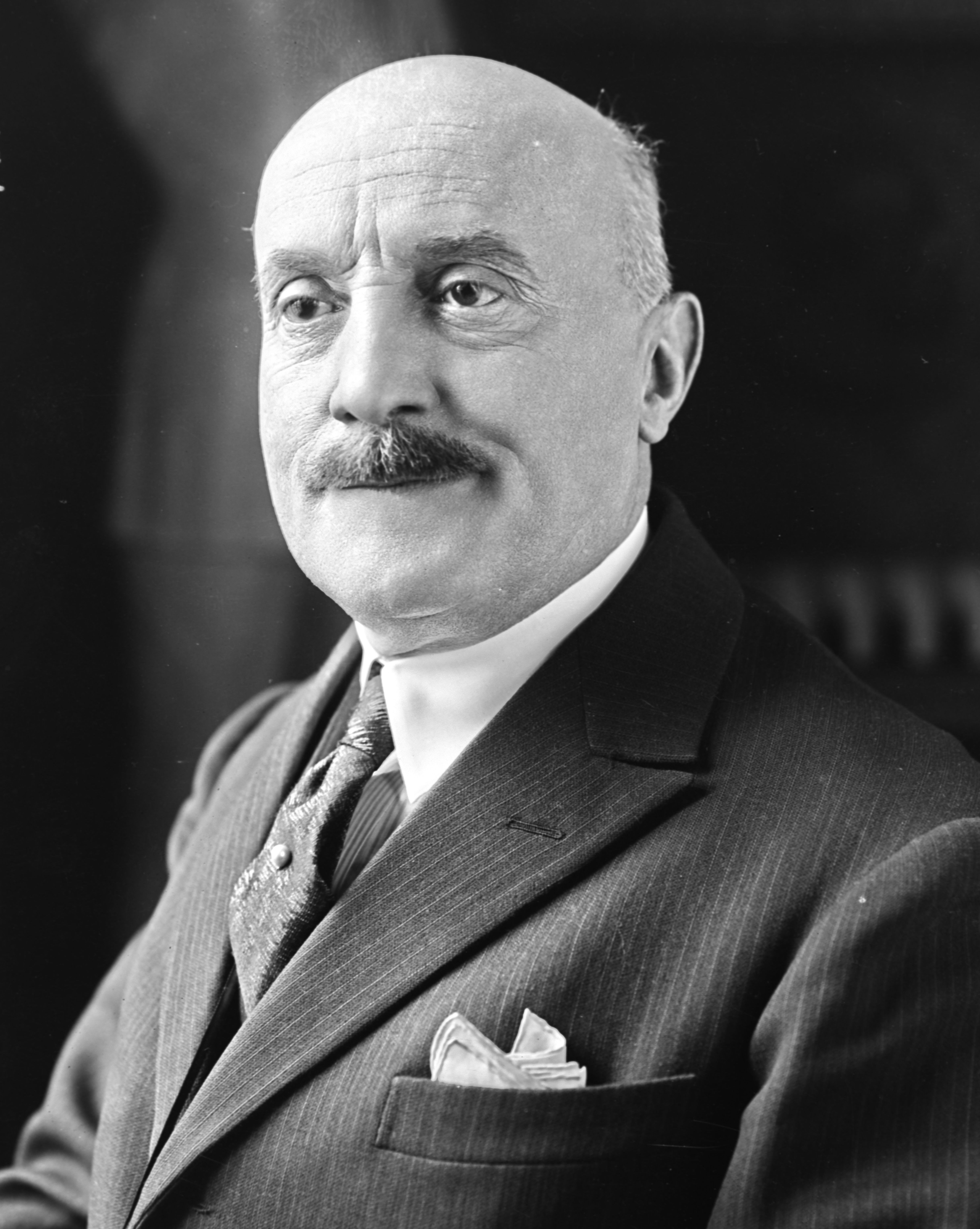
Caillaux

- French Finance Minister Joseph Caillaux spoke before the Chamber of Deputies, outlining the severity of the country's economic problems and asking for emergency powers to address them.
- Chiang Kai-shek was formally elected Chairman of the Central Executive Committee of the Kuomintang political party.

== July 7, 1926 (Wednesday) ==
- French Finance Minister Joseph Caillaux's request of the previous day for special powers was widely attacked in the Chamber of Deputies. Socialist Party leader Léon Blum declared, "Such action would be a veritable abdication of Parliament and violate the national sovereignty."
- Born: Nuon Chea, Cambodian Communist and second-in-command to Pol Pot in operating the Cambodian genocide, and briefly the Prime Minister of Democratic Kampuchea; as Lao Kim Lorn in Voat Kor, Battambang Province, French Indochina (died in prison, 2019)

== July 8, 1926 (Thursday) ==
- The Coal Mines Regulation Act 1908, commonly called "the Eight-Hour Bill", was passed by the British House of Lords after having passed the House of Commons, prompting arguments and fist fighting between members of Commons and the Lords. The new law, which would receive royal assent by King George V, permitted an extra hour of work per day in coal mines. Before Britain's miners were locked out they usually worked seven hours. According to press accounts, a Tory MP of Commons, Ernest Roy Bird, threw a punch at a Labour MP "whom he took to be George Buchanan" and instead struck another Labour MP, James Patrick Gardner. Bird and Gardner scuffled before the fight was broken up by London police.
- A grand jury convened in the Aimee Semple McPherson kidnapping case to question McPherson about some questionable details that had arisen in her account of what had happened to her.
- Born:
  - Elisabeth Kübler-Ross, Swiss psychiatrist, pioneer in near-death studies, known for developing the "Kübler-Ross model" of the five stages of grief" in her 1969 book On Death and Dying; in Zürich (d. 2004)
  - John Dingell, U.S. Representative for Michigan for 59 years, from 1955 to 2015, and the longest serving member of Congress in American history; in Colorado Springs, Colorado (d. 2019)
  - Ian Gilmour, Baron Gilmour of Craigmillar, British Conservative politician who briefly served as Secretary of State for Defence in 1974 for Edward Heath; in London (d. 2007)
  - George Weyerhaeuser, American kidnapping victim and later the chairman of the board of the Weyerhaeuser Corporation, best known for having been kidnapped in 1935 at age eight and held for ransom; in Seattle (d. 2022)
- Died: Thomas R. R. Stebbing, 91, British zoologist who specialized in the study of crustaceans, known for his discoveries from the Challenger expedition of 1872–1876, and namesake for Metapenaeus stebbingi, the peregrine shrimp

== July 9, 1926 (Friday) ==
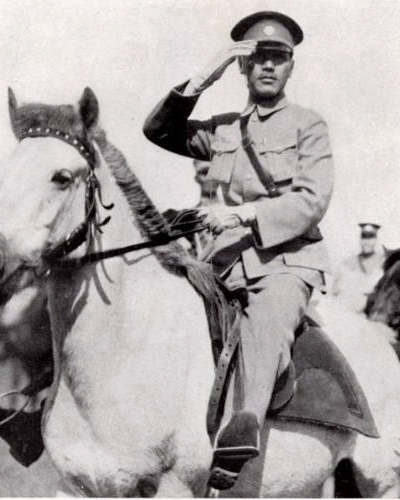
Chiang

- The Northern Expedition officially commenced in China when Chiang Kai-shek lectured 100,000 soldiers of the National Revolutionary Army.
- In Portugal, six weeks after the May 28 coup d'état that had overthrown Prime Minister António Maria da Silva and ended the Portuguese First Republic, General Óscar Carmona took power in a countercoup, overthrowing the president and premier, General Manuel Gomes da Costa, and declared himself the new Prime Minister. Carmona had planned the coup after Gomes da Costa had fired Carmona from his position as Foreign Minister.
- The Soviet Union passed a law forbidding the transportation of chervonets, worth 10 new rubles, out of the nation, a move to prevent smugglers from paying for foreign goods with what had become a more stable unit of money on foreign currency exchanges. The Soviets would follow on March 10, 1928, with another law barring the conversion of imported chervonets to rubles, making the currency worthless to foreign sellers.
- The Rudolph Valentino film The Son of the Sheik premiered in Los Angeles, though it would not go into general release until September.
- A solar eclipse was visible from Earth, with totality at 23:06:02 UTC. With the exception of the Hawaiian Islands at 1:02 in the afternoon local time, the path of the eclipse was over mostly uninhabited portions of the Pacific Ocean. The phenomenon was rare, in that the Moon was almost at apogee (its shortest distance from Earth) and, therefore, completely obscured the Sun during totality. Because of the International Date Line, the eclipse began on July 10 at 10:05 in the morning local time west of the date line
- The crash of a KLM passenger flight killed the pilot and the lone passenger as the Fokker F.VII airplane went down shortly after departing from Brussels on the second stage of a flight from Rotterdam to Paris. While the F.VII had seats for eight passengers, the only persons on board the pilot, A.C. de Vree, 32, and a Dutch businessman identified as Mr. W. Hepner.
- Born:
  - Murphy Anderson, American illustrator (d. 2015)
  - Pedro Dellacha, Argentine football defender and coach (d. 2010)
  - Mathilde Krim, Italian-American medical researcher and health educator (d. 2018)
  - Ben Roy Mottelson, Danish-born American nuclear physicist and 1975 Nobel Prize in Physics laureate for his work on the non-spherical geometry of atomic nuclei; in Chicago (d. 2022)
  - Patricia Ann McGee, U.S. Native American tribal leader of the Yavapai-Prescott tribe in Arizona; in Holbrook, Arizona (d. 1994)
- Died:
  - Matthew Astor Wilks, 82, American multi-millionaire, real estate mogul and socialite
  - Najaf bey Vazirov, 72, Azerbaijani playwright

== July 10, 1926 (Saturday) ==
- A bolt of lightning struck the Lake Denmark Naval Ammunition Depot near the Picatinny Arsenal in New Jersey. The resulting fire caused several million pounds of explosives to blow up in the next three days, killing 19 people and destroying 187 of 200 buildings in and near Lake Denmark.
- In a 4 a.m. vote following an all-night session, France's Chamber of Deputies voted to approve granting Finance Minister Joseph Caillaux the extraordinary powers he sought to address the country's economic crisis. The matter was then to go to the Finance Committee.
- Bobby Jones won the U.S. Open at Columbus, Ohio, by a single stroke over Joe Turnesa, 293 strokes to 294. With the win, Jones became the first golfer to win both the British Open (which he had captured 15 days earlier on June 25) and the U.S. Open in the same year.
- An international bridge over the Rio Grande, the border of the United States and Mexico, opened between McAllen, Texas in the U.S. and Reynosa, Tamaulipas state in Mexico.
- Macedonians from Bulgaria conducted the first of a series of raids across the border of the Kingdom of the Serbs, Croats and Slovenes.
- Born: Fred Gwynne, American television and film actor known for The Munsters and My Cousin Vinny; in New York City (d. 1993)

== July 11, 1926 (Sunday) ==
- An estimated 20,000 French veterans of World War One paraded silently through the rainy streets of Paris to protest the Mellon-Berenger Agreement. Blind and maimed veterans led the procession to the Place des États-Unis where they laid wreaths, as well as plaques explaining their position that the debt settlement would ruin France.
- In China, the Kuomintang faction led by Chiang Kai-shek of captured Changsha, the capital of the Hunan province.
- The first German Grand Prix auto race was staged at the AVUS (Automobil-Verkehrs- und Übungsstrasse) highway for a total distance of 390 kilometres (240 mi) in Berlin, with a variety of 44 sports cars due to the lack of automobiles that met the Grand Prix standards. During the inaugural race, the timekeeper was killed and two other persons injured when a car driven by Adolf Rosenberger crashed into one of the race marshal's stands. The event was won by Rudolf Caracciola.
- Born:
  - Frederick Buechner, American novelist, author of theological books, and Presbyterian minister known for A Long Day's Dying (1950), The Book of Bebb series of four books (1972–1977), and Godric (novel) (1981), as well as the non-fiction Telling the Truth: the Gospel as tragedy, comedy, and fairy tale (1971); in New York City (d.2022)
  - Ralph "Papa" Thorson, American bounty hunter profiled in the book and film The Hunter; in Anaconda, Montana (d. 1991)
  - Bob Backus, American track and field athlete who set the world record in the hammer throw (45 feet, 2 inches in the 56-pound throw in 1957 and 66'2¾" for the 35 pound throw in 1959) after overcoming disabilities caused by spinal meningitis; in Boston (d. 1999)
  - The Crusher (ring name for Reginald Lisowski), American professional wrestler; in South Milwaukee, Wisconsin (d. 2005)
- Died: James Clark, an African-American chauffeur for a traveling salesman, was arrested in the town of Eau Gallie, Florida (near Melbourne) after being accused of rape by a white girl, then turned over to a mob of 10 white men who carried out his lynching. After a noose was placed around his neck, the mob pulled him up over a tree limb, then shot him while he was being hanged. The crime was not investigated, and nobody was ever prosecuted for Clark's murder.

== July 12, 1926 (Monday) ==
The music of Amhrán na bhFiann

- The national anthem of the Republic of Ireland, Amhrán na bhFiann (A Soldier's Song), composed with music by Peadar Kearney and Patrick Heeney, was officially adopted by order of Ireland's Executive Council, headed by Prime Minister W. T. Cosgrave.
- General Motors acquired the Flint Institute of Technology in Michigan and renamed it the General Motors Institute of Technology. Today it is known as Kettering University.
- Born:
  - Siti Hasmah Mohamad Ali, spouse of Malaysian Prime Minister Mahathir Mohamad (d. 2026)
- Died:
  - Gertrude Bell, 57, English archaeologist, writer, spy, and administrator and founder of the Iraq Museum, nicknamed "The Uncrowned Queen of Mesopotamia", died from an overdose of sleeping pills.
  - John W. Weeks, 66, American banker and politician who served as U.S. Secretary of War from 1921 to 1925, and U.S. Senator for Massachusetts from 1913 to 1919.

== July 13, 1926 (Tuesday) ==
- In Turkey, trials concluded in the Izmir plot the month before to assassinate Turkish president Mustafa Kemal. Of 40 people tried (two in absentia), 15 were sentenced to be executed, and another to be exiled, while 57 others remained to be tried. Hangings began that day and continued into the next morning. Eight convicts executed the first day were General Mehmet Arif Bey, 43; General Rüştü Pasha, 54; Justice Minister Hafız Mehmet and parliament members Ismail Canbulat, 46; Abidin Bey, tr:Ahmet Şükrü Bayındır, Sarı Efe Edip Bey, tr:Mehmet Halis Tarıkahya,
- In Florence, King Victor Emmanuel III of Italy took a boy who had just been hit by a train into his auto and rushed the boy to the hospital. The boy died in the car.
- Born: Dr. Joseph E. Bogen, American neurophysiologist and researcher in split-brain research; in Cincinnati (d. 2005)
- Died: Major General Littleton Waller, 69, U.S. Marine Corps officer known for service in multiple wars and for being court-martialed for the disastrous Samar expedition in the Philippine–American War and the summary execution of 11 Filipino civilian porters at Lanang for mutiny in 1902

== July 14, 1926 (Wednesday) ==
- As hangings of Izmir Plot conspirators continued, former member of parliament Ziya Hurşit was executed after being convicted of conspiring to assassinate President Mustafa Kemal, along with Laz İsmail, Gürcü Yusuf, Çopur Hilmi, Şükrü Bey, "Ayıcı" Arif, Miralay Rasim Bey, and Halis Turgut Bey.
- In New York, Linton Wells and Edward Steptoe Evans completed their flight around the world in 28 days, 14 hours and 37 minutes, beating the old record of 35 days set by John Henry Mears in 1913.
- A royal decree was issued by Spain's King Alfonso XIII, holding that chiefs and officers who were passed over for promotion were not entitled to an appeal, nor to know the reasons for the denial of advancement.
- In the U.S., a fire at the Twilight Inn at Haines Falls, New York in the Catskills killed 14 people, including a night watchman who woke up and evacuated numerous guests, and 21 were injured.
- Born:
  - Harry Dean Stanton, American film actor; in West Irvine, Kentucky (d. 2017)
  - Gustave Botiaux, French opera tenor; in Puteaux, Hauts-de-Seine département (d. 2025)
  - U.S. Marine Private George Phillips, posthumous Medal of Honor recipient for saving the lives of two other Marines by throwing himself upon an activated hand grenade on March 14, 1945, at the Battle of Iwo Jima; in Rich Hill, Missouri (killed 1945)

== July 15, 1926 (Thursday) ==
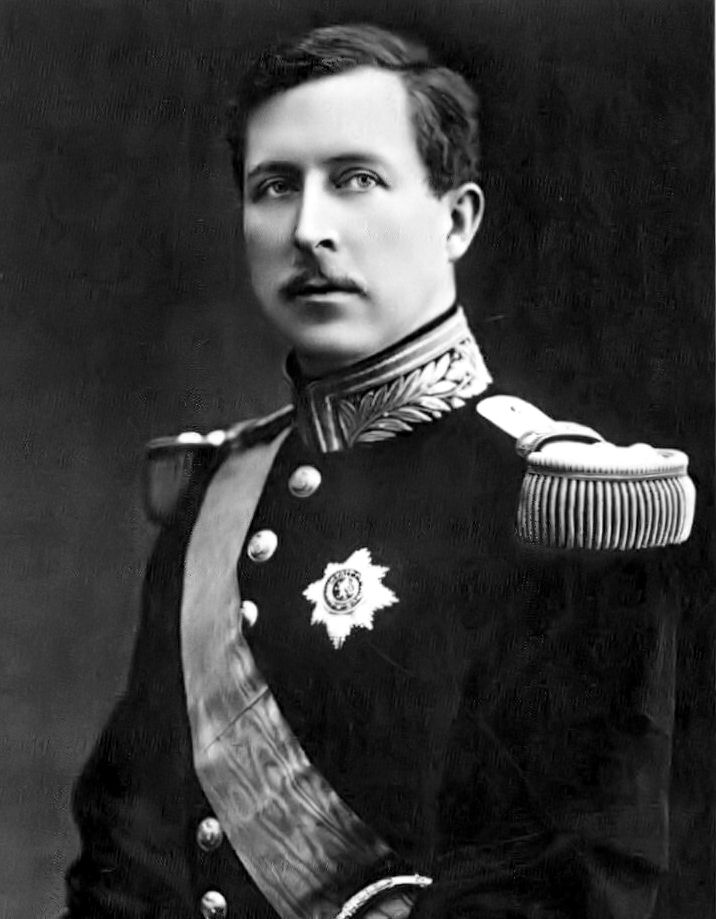
King Albert

- Both houses of the Parliament of Belgium voted to grant King Albert of Belgium six months of practically unlimited powers to try to stop the country's worsening inflation problem and the falling value of the nation's currency, the Belgian franc. The vote was unanimous in the Belgian Senate and approved by an overwhelming majority in the Chamber of Deputies in favor of the bill drawn by Prime Minister Henri Jaspar.
- The Central Committee of the Communist Party of the Soviet Union approved the funding of the Party's project to resettle 570,400 Jewish families from the Ukrainian SSR and the Byelorussian SSR to specific areas in the Crimea region of Ukraine, with 191 million Soviet rubles to fund the relocation.
- Born:
  - Leopoldo Galtieri, President of Argentina 1981 to 1982; in Caseros, Buenos Aires (d. 2003)
  - Tran Bach Dang, Vietnamese commander of the Viet Cong who planned the Tet Offensive in 1968 in the Vietnam War; as Truong Gia Trieu in Hòa Thuận commune, Kiên Giang province, Annam protectorate (d. 2007)
- Died: Francisco Bertrand, 59, President of Honduras from 1911 to 1912 and 1913 to 1919

== July 16, 1926 (Friday) ==
- The Finance Committee of the Chamber of Deputies voted 14–13 against granting Finance Minister Joseph Caillaux the power to legislate by decree to address the currency devaluation crisis, which worsened as the bourse closed with the franc trading at 206.40 francs to the British pound and 42.49 francs to the U.S. dollar.
- Joseph Bech formed a government as the new Prime Minister of Luxembourg, forming a government with himself as Foreign Minister, as well as the minister of agriculture and of education, succeeding Pierre Prüm, whose government had resigned the day before.
- Jack Delaney defeated Paul Berlenbach to win boxing's World Light Heavyweight Title.
- The National Art Gallery of the Philippines was opened in Manila. It is now the National Museum of Fine Arts
- The Grand Mosque of Paris, the largest in France for Muslim worshipers, was inaugurated by French President Gaston Doumergue and Moroccan Sultan Yusef ben Hassan.
- Hoover Field, one of the most hazardous airfields in the U.S., opened to commercial airline use to serve Washington, D.C.. The airfield and the Washington Airport were located at Arlington, Virginia at the site now occupied by The Pentagon.
- A series of "Queen Anne's Bounty" public welfare acts in the United Kingdom, passed in 1706, 1707 and 1716, were repealed after more than 200 years with the passage of the First Fruits and Tenths Measure 1926.
- Born:
  - Irwin Rose, biologist and recipient of the Nobel Prize in Chemistry; in Brooklyn, New York (d. 2015)
  - Stanley Clements, American actor and comedian, in Long Island, New York (d. 1981)
  - Paul M. Ellwood Jr., American neurologist, medical administrator and health care reformer known for the expansion of the health maintenance organization network and for coining its name, the HMO; in San Francisco (d. 2022)
  - Évariste Kimba, Congolese journalist and politician who served as the Foreign Minister for the secessionist Republic of Katanga from 1960 to 1963, and briefly as the Prime Minister of the Democratic Republic of the Congo for six weeks in 1965; in Nsaka, Belgian Congo (executed 1966)
  - Mohammad Sadeq Rouhani, Iranian Shi'ite Muslim cleric and a Grand Ayatollah, marja' of the Twelver Shi'ite sect, later placed under arrest in the Islamic Republic of Iran; in Qom (d. 2022)
  - Hank Beebe, American composer for Broadway musicals and in advertisements; in Pitman, New Jersey (d. 2023)
- Died:
  - Don Mellett, 34, American editor, was shot to death after confronting organized crime in his newspaper Canton Daily News. Mellett was returning home after work and closing his garage door.
  - Roshanara (stage name for Olive Craddock), 32, British Indian-born dancer and instructor, died from appendicitis.

== July 17, 1926 (Saturday) ==
- In Yugoslavia, near Sarajevo in Bosnia, 117 people were killed in a landslide which buried a railway train.
- France's Prime Minister Aristide Briand and his cabinet of ministers resigned after the Chamber of Deputies voted a lack of confidence in the Briand government, 285 to 243, on a motion introduced by the Chamber's president, Édouard Herriot. The motion followed after Finance Minister Caillaux's final demand for power to decree the value of the French franc.
- In Mexico City, a meeting of Catholics resolved to organize a nationwide boycott to protest the Calles Law. The boycott covered items that constituted a large part of government income (such as lottery tickets), items subject to heavy excise duties (such as stamps), and items subject to heavy import duties.
- The Royal Canadian Legion veterans organization was incorporated by special act of the Canadian Parliament.
- The National Kwangtung University, founded in 1924 in the Republic of China, was renamed National Sun Yat-sen University in honor of the founder and first president of the republic.
- Born:
  - Robert Ashby, African-American U.S. Army Air Forces pilot and one of the Tuskegee Airmen, known after World War II to become the first black airline pilot when was hired by Frontier Airlines in 1973; in Yemassee, South Carolina (d. 2021)
  - Calvin Zippin, American cancer epidemiologist and biostatistician who created the "Zippin Estimator" procedure for estimating wildlife populations using data from trapping experiments; in Albany, New York (alive in 2026)
  - James Weinstein, American liberal commentator and historian known for founding the magazine In These Times; in New York City (d. 2005)
  - Willis Carto, American right-wing political activist, white supremacist and founder of the Liberty Lobby; in Fort Wayne, Indiana (d. 2015)
  - William Pierson, American TV actor; in Brooklyn, New York (d. 2004)

== July 18, 1926 (Sunday) ==
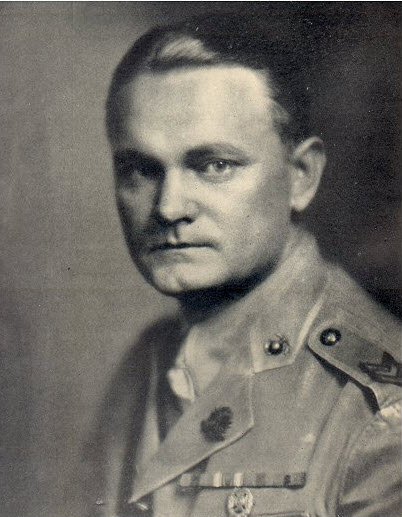
"King Faustin II"

- U.S. Marine Corps Gunnery Sergeant Faustin E. Wirkus, stationed on Haiti's Gonâve Island during the U.S. occupation of the Caribbean nation, was crowned as "King Faustin II" and co-ruler with the tribal ruler of the island, Queen Ti Memenne. Because of his assistance in having charges dismissed against the Queen, and the coincidence of having the same first name as Faustin Soulouque, who had ruled Haiti as "Emperor Faustin I" from 1849 to 1859, Staff Sergeant Wirkus was recognized by the Taino people of Gonâve as their monarch before being transferred to the U.S. mainland in 1929. After leaving the Marines in 1931, he would tell of his experiences in a book.

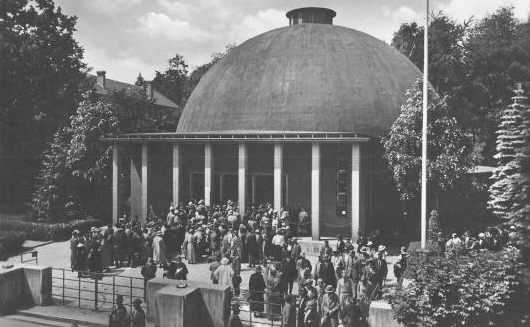
The Zeiss Planetarium

- The Zeiss-Planetarium, the world's first building with a geodesic dome, was opened to the public in Jena, a city in Germany's State of Thuringia. The dome was designed by inventor Walther Bauersfeld for projection of images of stars on its interior.
- An anonymous editorial titled "Pink Powder Puffs" was published in the Chicago Daily Tribune which blamed actor Rudolph Valentino for the installation of a face-powder dispenser in a new men's public washroom and implied that he was responsible for the feminization of American men. Valentino was enraged. Among the caustic comments made were, "A powder vending machine! In a men's washroom! Homo Americanus! Why didn't someone quietly drown Rudolph Guglielmo, alias Valentino, years ago?"
- Lucien Buysse of Belgium won the 1926 Tour de France.
- Jules Goux of France won the European Grand Prix, held at the Circuito Lasarte in the Basque region of Spain, near the city of San Sebastián, and was won by Jules Goux of France.
- The Charley Chase short (23 minutes) film silent comedy Mighty Like a Moose, later selected for preservation by the U.S. National Film Registry, opened.
- Born:
  - Margaret Laurence, Canadian novelist known for The Stone Angel and its four sequels in the "Manawaka series"; in Neepawa, Manitoba (d. 1987)
  - Robert Sloman, English writer, in Oldham, Lancashire (d. 2005)
- Died: Josef Redtenbacher, 70, Austrian entomologist

== July 19, 1926 (Monday) ==
- The government of the Lebanese Republic published the decree "Competition for the Selection of the Lebanese National Anthem" in two phases, one for composing a suitable Arabic language poem and the second for setting the chosen poem to music. In October, Rachid Nakhle won the competition with the poem "Kullunā li-l-waṭan, li-l-ʿulā li-l-ʿalam" ("All for the Homeland, for Glory, for the Flag") and Wadih Sabra would win the prize for the melody.

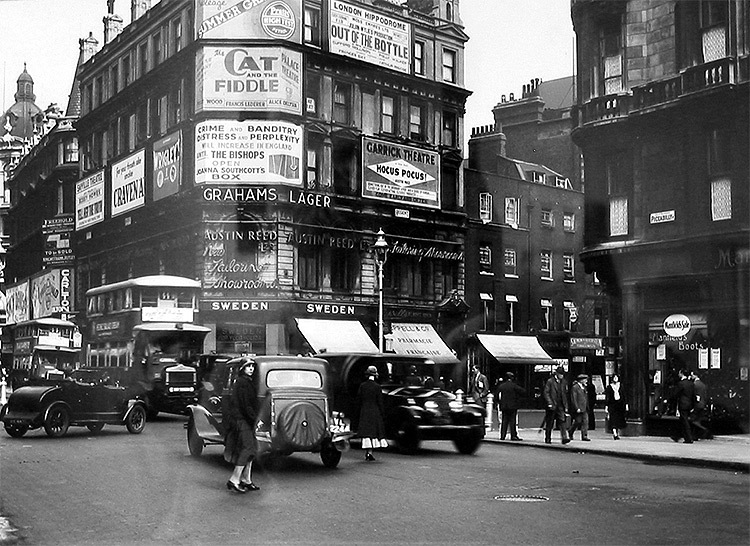
Piccadilly Circus six years after the roundabout

- To relieve traffic congestion at London's Piccadilly Circus, a one-way roundabout went into operation to handle traffic entering from the streets of Haymarket, Pall Mall and Cockspur, following a similar pattern used in Trafalgar Square. A newspaper article in The Times noted that "All traffic entering Piccadilly-circus will turn left and proceed in clockwise direction... and under the scheme there will be only five direct traffic cuts compared with 18 under the existing conditions."
- Rudolph Valentino responded to the previous day's editorial in the Tribune with an essay of his own for the Chicago Herald-Examiner, challenging the writer to come forward and face him in a boxing or wrestling match. The author did not come forward, to Valentino's disappointment.
- Rumored dissensions among the crew of the airship Norge in the recent North Pole expedition fell into the public sphere as Umberto Nobile shot back at a statement Lincoln Ellsworth had made which denied that Nobile had piloted the airship. Nobile insisted that he steered the entire flight and asserted that Ellsworth was "just a passenger."
- Born: Helen Gallagher, American stage actress and soap opera performer, winner of the Tony Award in 1952 and in 1971 for No, No, Nanette, and three Daytime Emmy awards for Ryan's Hope in 1976, 1977 and 1988; in New York City (d. 2024)Tate 1991, p. 244.
- Died:
  - Charles Avery (stage name for Charles Avery Bradford), 53, American silent film director and actor known for being one of the original seven Keystone Cops, died in the bathroom of his apartment in Hollywood, California. His body would be found four days later.
  - Ada Cambridge, 81, English-born Australian writer of serial novels and romance fiction

== July 20, 1926 (Tuesday) ==
- Édouard Herriot took office as the new Prime Minister of France and his new Finance Minister Anatole de Monzie worked on presentation for his plans to save the franc, which had continued to plummet, down to 49.22 against the U.S. dollar.
- The grand jury in the Aimee Semple McPherson case adjourned, finding insufficient evidence to indict McPherson and her mother on charges of manufacturing evidence and giving false testimony to police.
- Born: Manolo Navarro, Spanish matador celebrated as "el decano de lost matadores" ("the dean of the bullfighters"); in Albacete (died from COVID-19, 2020)
- Died: Felix Dzerzhinsky, 48, Soviet Russian police agency administrator who was the first director of the secret police organizations Cheka and its successors, the GPU and the OGPU, died of a heart attack at his apartment, hours after delivering a two-hour speech to the Central Committee of the Soviet Communist Party.

== July 21, 1926 (Wednesday) ==
- The government of France's Prime Minister Édouard Herriot, who had taken office the day before, was brought down in its first vote of confidence. The Chamber of Deputies voted 290 against and only 237 in favor. Herriot delivered the note of resignation of his government to President Doumergue. The vote of defeat occurred following a report from Finance Minister Anatole de Monzie to the Chamber, that the nation's Treasury was on the verge of bankruptcy and had only $1.2 million left in its reserve. With the news of the fall of the new government, the value of the French franc fell to the lowest in its history, worth less than $0.02 (two cents) against the American dollar, rising to a dollar being worth 51 cents.
- Born:
  - General Rahimuddin Khan, Chairman of the Joint Chiefs of Staff of the Pakistani Army from 1984 to 1987, and Governor of Balochistan from 1978 to 1984; in Kaimganj, United Provinces of Agra and Oudh, British India (present-day Uttar Pradesh state in India) (d. 2022)
  - Sim (stage name for Simon Berryer), French comedian and character actor on TV and film, known for law enforcement roles and for portraying "Geriatrix" in two of the Asterix films at the age of 73 and 82; in Cauterets, Hautes-Pyrénées département (d. 2009)
  - Bill Pertwee, English comedian and character actor known for law enforcement roles in Dad's Army and You Rang, M'Lord?; in Amersham, Buckinghamshire (d. 2013)
  - Robert Birenbaum, French resistance fighter and recipient of the Légion d'honneur medal for courage; in Paris (d. 2025)

== July 22, 1926 (Thursday) ==
- The Radio Corporation of America (RCA) became the largest radio broadcasting company in the United States as it purchased the 15 radio stations, including WEAF in New York City) of the Broadcasting Company of America (a subsidiary of the American Telephone and Telegraph company from AT&T for one million dollars (equivalent to $18,500,000 one century later). The deal allowed RCA to supplement its existing radio network of four stations (WJZ in New York City, WRC in Washington DC, WGY in Schenectady, New York and WBZ in Springfield, Massachusetts), and to allow RCA to use AT&T's telephone lines for enlarging the network. RCA would then launch the National Broadcasting Company (NBC) on November 15, 1926.
- At Fremantle in the state of Western Australia, during flooding of the Swan River, an officer from the harbour tender Reliance noticed that the north railway bridge over the river was on the verge of collapse. While George Henderson was inspecting an increased gap on the bridge, a passenger train that included a group of schoolchildren came across at 1:12 in the afternoon. Henderson "was horrified to see that the gap open to a width of five or six inches" and alerted rail officials to stop all train traffic. Five minutes after the 1:12 train crossed, a 50 feet (15 m) section of the bridge fell into the floodwaters below. All traffic was stopped before another train, the 1:50 train from Fremantle to Perth, came over the line.
- In the U.S., 11 passengers on a sightseeing bus were killed and 38 others injured when the driver ran off of a curve while traveling downhill from the Bear Mountain State Park while traveling back to Brooklyn. The bus rolled over three times before crashing into the side of a building at Sparkill, New York near Nyack. The driver, Daniel J. Lastro, was arrested at the scene and later charged with 11 counts of vehicular homicide.
- In a publicity stunt for the Citizens' Military Training Camp, Babe Ruth caught a baseball dropped from an altitude of about 300 feet from a passing airplane, piloted by Harold M. McClelland at Mitchel Field at Garden City, New York on Long Island. It took him seven tries.
- A heat wave set a record which would still stand 99 years later in the U.S. state of New York, as the temperature reached 108 °F (42 °C) in Troy. Ten people died from heat-related illness, and another 43 required medical treatment.
- The 125 feet (38 m) tall Astoria Column, a tower with a spiral staircase leading to an observation deck was dedicated in Astoria, Oregon.
- Born:
  - Dorcas Reilly, American chef for the Campbell's soup company, known for inventing the popular green bean casserole in 1955; in Woodbury, New Jersey (d. 2018)
  - Bryan Forbes (stage name for John Theobald Clarke), English film director known for The Stepford Wives; in Stratford, Essex (d. 2013)
  - J. I. Packer, English-born Canadian evangelist and theologian, known for his 1973 bestseller Knowing God; in Twyning, Gloucestershire (d. 2020)
- Died:
  - Friedrich von Wieser, 75, Austrian economist and developer of the marginal utility theory
  - Willard Louis, 44, American stage and silent film actor known for The Honeymoon Express and The Man Without a Conscience, died from typhoid fever and pneumonia.

== July 23, 1926 (Friday) ==
- Raymond Poincaré formed the new government in France. He took the positions of both prime minister and Finance Minister.
- Fox Studios purchased all rights to the patents owned by the Case Research Lab for the Movietone sound system for recording sound onto film.
- New revelations came out in the Aimee Semple McPherson kidnapping mystery, as claims surfaced that McPherson had been around Carmel-by-the-Sea, California, living in a rented cottage with a man named Kenneth Ormiston during the time she was allegedly kidnapped.
- Born:
  - Ike Heller, American toy manufacturer, co-founder of Remco toys, and philanthropist; in Ellenville, New York (d. 2015)
  - John T. Lupton II, American philanthropist and businessman; in Chattanooga, Tennessee (d. 2010)
- Died:
  - Kurt Wüsthoff, 29, German flying ace with 27 confirmed victories in World War One, died five days after crashing while at a flying show practicing aerobatics. The air show was in commemoration of the death of Max Immelmann, another German flying ace, who had been killed when his airplane crashed after being shot down.
  - Kaneko Fumiko, 23, Japanese anarchist, died of an apparent suicide in her jail cell after rejecting a commutation of her death sentence to life imprisonment for plotting an assassination of the Emperor.

== July 24, 1926 (Saturday) ==
- The first of thousands of Japanese immigrants to Brazil, primarily agricultural workers, departed from the Port of Kobe in Japan. They would reach the city of Tomé-Açu in Brazil's Pará state on September 22, 1926.
- Britain's first greyhound racing track opened at Belle Vue Stadium in Manchester.
- The collapse of a footbridge in the small town of Whitesville, West Virginia, killed six people and injured 60 others. The casualties, who fell 20 feet (6.1 m) into the Coal River were part of a group of 125 spectators who had crowded on to the bridge to watch a group of stunt divers as part of a free carnival act.
- Born:
  - Frank Spitzer, Austrian-born American mathematician known for Spitzer's formula (1957) for calculating the joint distribution of partial sums and maximal partial sums of a collection of random variables and frr the asymmetric simple exclusion process (1970); in Vienna (d.1992)
  - Grace Glueck, American arts journalist who worked for 60 years for The New York Times from 1951 until 2011 and successfully sued to end the newspapers discrimination against women; in New York City (d.2022)
- Died: T. C. Steele, 78, American impressionist landscape painter

== July 25, 1926 (Sunday) ==
- On the last Sunday before the anti-religious Calles Law was to take effect in Mexico, thousands of Roman Catholics made a pilgrimage to Tepeyac the Basilica of Our Lady of Guadalupe, and to other shrines and churches in the country. The journey followed the publication in newspapers around Mexico of a pastoral letter, signed by the Archbishop of Mexico City, José Mora y del Rio, as well as seven other archbishops and 29 bishops, ordering the suspension of services in all Catholic churches and directing all priests to stay away effective July 31. The advertisements also called for, as an act of protest, an boycott of businesses supporting the Calles Law.
- Born:
  - Ray Solomonoff, American mathematician known for his invention, in 1960, of algorithmic probability; in Cleveland (d. 2009)
  - Melinda Kistétényi, Hungarian composer and organ player; in Budapest (d. 1999)

== July 26, 1926 (Monday) ==
- The most destructive hurricane ever recorded in the Bahamas struck the islands in the evening and raged through the next day, drowning more than 150 people, including those on ships that had departed from Nassau during the weekend. Among the vessels missing were two government mail boats, the Albertine Adouie, with 40 people on board, and the Brontes, with 20, along with the sloop Hilda, the schooner Solonia, yacht Isoceles, and several other unidentified boats and vessels.
- Prime Minister Raymond Poincaré of France announced his plan to stabilize the franc by rebalancing the budget with new business taxes, as well as tariffs aimed at protecting imports from French colonies. Markets responded favourably as the franc rebounded to 39 against the U.S. dollar.
- The Convention and Statute on the International Régime of Maritime Ports, a treaty signed by multiple nations on December 9, 1923, entered into force after its ratification by the required number of nations. It continues to provide that in peacetime, ships of all nations shall have freedom of access to maritime ports regardless of their maritime flag.
- In what was described as "a unique military Alpine feat", a group of Swiss Army officers took 600 recruits on an ascent of the 10,650 feet (3,250 m) high Devil's Mountain and reached the summit at 8:30 in the morning. The entire group then descended, without any of the group needing medical treatment
- Born:
  - James Best (stage name for Jewel Franklin Guy), American actor known for portraying Sheriff Roscoe P. Coltrane on The Dukes of Hazzard; in Powderly, Kentucky (d. 2015)
  - Lennox Sebe, President of Ciskei bantustan in South Africa from 1981 to 1990; in King William's Town (now Qonce), Eastern Cape Province; (d. 1994)
  - Nguyen Huu Hanh, Vietnamese military officer who served as a Brigadier General in the South Vietnamese ARVN while being a spy for the Viet Cong; in Phu Phong, French Indochina (d. 2019)
  - Eric Kwamina Otoo, Ghanaian diplomat and U.S. Ambassador for Ghana to West Germany (1972–1974) and the United States (1982–1990); in Koforidua, British Colony of the Gold Coast (d. 2004)
- Died:
  - Robert Todd Lincoln, 82, U.S. Secretary of War 1881–1885, U.S. Ambassador to the United Kingdom 1889–1893, and the last surviving son of U.S. President Abraham Lincoln and Mary Todd Lincoln
  - Philippe Dartiguenave, 63, President of Haiti from 1915 to 1922 during the U.S. occupation.

== July 27, 1926 (Tuesday) ==
- The Philippine House of Representatives voted to approve a resolution calling for a plebiscite on independence for the U.S. Territory. The resolution was vetoed by the U.S. Military Governor, Leonard Wood, but the legislature overrode the veto and the measure then went to the final consideration of U.S. President Coolidge.
- The government of France's Prime Minister Raymond Poincaré received overwhelming support in its first vote of confidence on Poincaré's measures to save the nation's economy, with the motion approved 358 to 131.
- Britain reached an agreement with Lincoln Clark Andrews, the chief of Prohibition enforcement in the United States, to thwart liquor smuggling into the U.S.
- Born:
  - General Arun Shridhar Vaidya, Chairman of the Chiefs of Staff of India from 1984 to 1986; in Alibag, Bombay Presidency, British India (assassinated 1986)
  - W. David Kingery, American ceramics scientist and 1999 Kyoto Prize laureate; in White Plains, New York (d. 2000)
  - Doris Satterfield, American AAGPBL baseball player; in Belmont, North Carolina (d. 1993)

== July 28, 1926 (Wednesday) ==
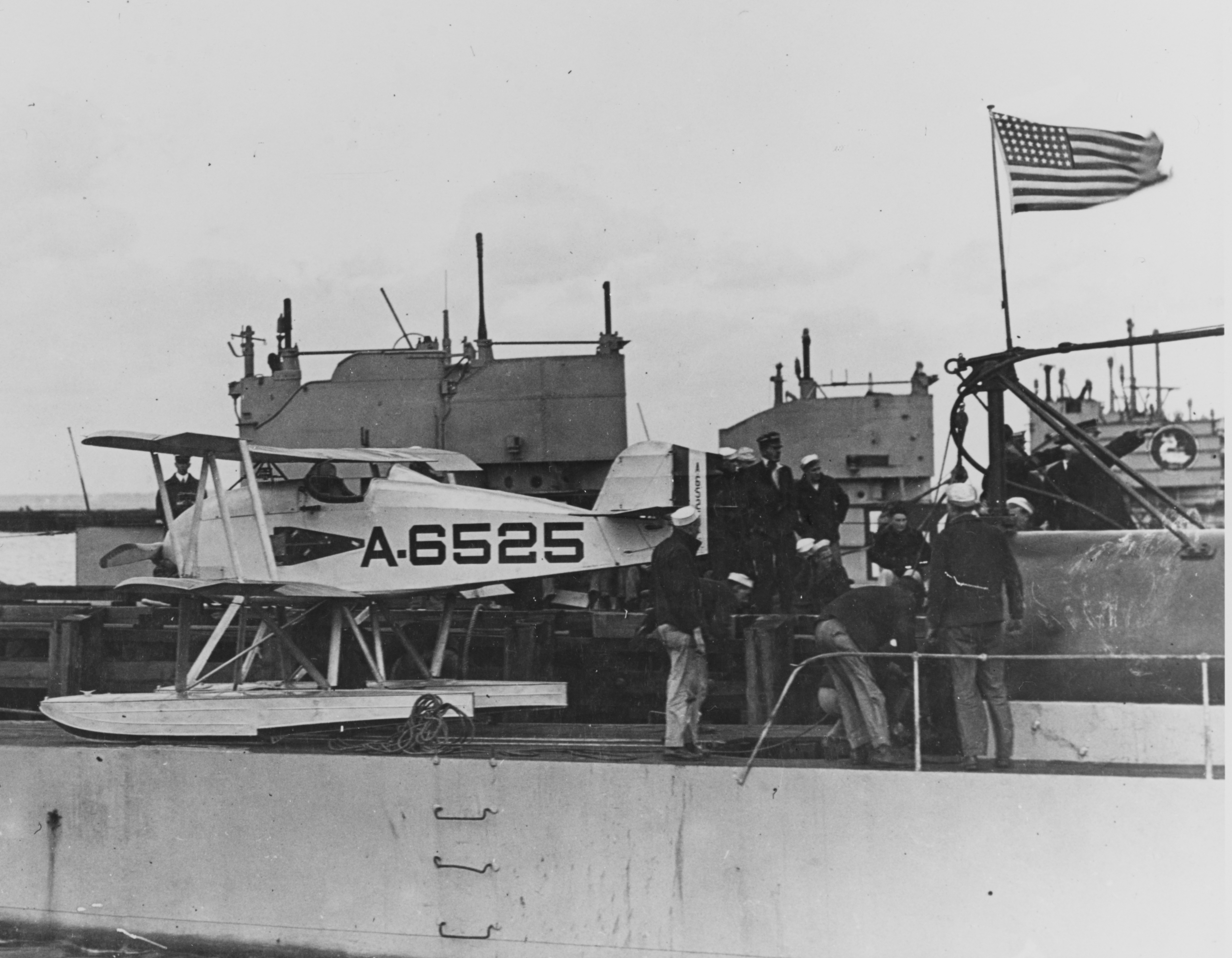
1923 photo of an MS-1 plane on the deck of the submarine USS S-1

- The Martin MS-1 seaplane, the only airplane designed to be carried inside a submarine, went through its first and only demonstration. The American submarine USS S-1 surfaced from the Thames River in London, and the MS-1 was assembled, launched, retrieved, disassembled and put back in the S-1. Further production was abandoned because of the impracticality of use of assembling the airplane during wartime.
- What is now GE HealthCare in the U.S. was formed when the General Electric merged with the Victor X-Ray Corporation, manufacturer of x-ray tubes to form the General Electric X-Ray Corporation
- The Geneva Opium Protocol, signed on February 11, 1925, became effective upon its terms, 90 days after being ratified by a second nation. It would be superseded in 1961 by the Single Convention on Narcotic Drugs.
- Born:
  - David Van Bik, Burmese Chin theologian, Christian evangelist and Biblical scholar, and author of dictionaries of the Hakha Chin language; in Tlangpi, Burma Province, British India (now Myanmar) (d. 2001)
  - Walt Brown, American politician who ran for U.S. president as the candidate of the Socialist Party USA in 2004 and served as an Oregon state senator from 1975 to 1987; in Los Angeles (alive in 2026)

== July 29, 1926 (Thursday) ==
- The Convention and Statute on the International Régime of Maritime Ports, signed in Geneva on December 9, 1923, to provide freedom of access to maritime ports without regard to a ship's nationality or maritime flag, went into effect.
- A group of 2,000 pilgrims from Milan, attempting to visit the church of the Madonna del Sasso in Locarno were barred by Italian authorities from crossing the border into Switzerland. Premier Benito Mussolini had ordered Italians to spend their money within Italy. The event marked the first time in 400 years that the pilgrimage from Italy had been stopped.
- After spending one night in jail, ganglord Al Capone of Cicero, Illinois, was freed after having been arrested on charges arising from the April 27 murder of assistant State's Attorney William McSwiggin and two friends, James J. Doherty, and Thomas "Red" Duffy. The new assistant State's Attorney, George E. Gorman, said that the state of Illinois did not have evidence to support the charge. Capone posted a $5,000 bond for other charges arising from an indictment for conspiracy to violate the prohibition law.
- Born: Jacek Bochenski, Polish novelist, nonfiction writer and dissident; in Lwow (now Lviv in Ukraine (alive in 2026)

== July 30, 1926 (Friday) ==
- Elections were held in the Netherlands for 25 of the 50 seats in the Eerste Kamer (First Chamber), the upper house of the bicameral Staten-Generaal parliament. The ruling coalition (of the Christelijk-Historische Unie (CHU), the Anti-Revolutionaire Partij (ARP) and the Roomsch-Katholieke Staatspartij (RKSP)) lost one seat and but retained their 30-seat majority in the Eerste Kamer.
- The Albanian Border Treaty was signed, in which Britain, France, Greece, Italy, and the Kingdom of the Serbs, Croats and Slovenes settled the frontiers of Albania.
- Police in Mexico City fired on a group that refused to leave the San Rafael Church, and firefighters used water cannons to disperse angry crowds who were throwing stones at authorities in protest at the "Calles Law", which would come into effect the following day.
- Born:
  - Lilia Michel (stage name for Lilia Fernández Larios), Mexican film and television actress known for Crepúsculo (1945) and No basta ser charro (1950); in Teapa, Tabasco state (d. 2011)
  - Bill Schultz, American businessman and engineer who served as the CEO of the guitar maker Fender and saved the company from failure; in McKeesport, Pennsylvania (d. 2006)
- Died: Irénée Berge, 59, French composer and conductor

== July 31, 1926 (Saturday) ==
- The "Calles Law", an anticlerical executive decree by Mexico's President Plutarco Elías Calles for strict regulation of religion (including government licensing of Roman Catholic priests) went into effect after having been announced on June 14. The Catholic Archbishop of Mexico, José Mora y del Rio, directed the nation's priests to go on strike, and rioting broke out with three people dying, others injured more than 50 arrested.
- By a margin of 295 to 188, the French Chamber of Deputies voted overwhelmingly in favour of Prime Minister Raymond Poincaré's drastic tax increase plan to save the nation from bankruptcy by adding 2.5 billion francs (equivalent to $62 million U.S.) to the nation's treasury in 1926 and nine billion francs (90 million U.S. dollars) in 1927. Poincare warned deputies that every day of delay in passage would cost the French Treasury 16 million francs.
- Born:
  - Hilary Putnam, American mathamatician known for the Davis–Putnam algorithm and philosopher known for the Quine–Putnam indispensability argument, the Twin Earth thought experiment; in Chicago (d.2016)
  - Rupert Neve, British born American electronics engineer and Grammy Award winner known as "the father of modern studio recording"; in Newton Abbot, Devonshire (d.2021)
  - Ian Moffitt, Australian journalist and novelist known for the bestselling The Retreat of Radiance; in Sydney (d.2000)
