= International Conference on Communications and Transit, 1921 =

League of Nations event

The International Conference on Communications and Transit was an event organised by the League of Nations in Barcelona from 10 March to 20 April 1921. It was the first international conference organised by the League of Nations, institution created two years before as the result of the Treaty of Versailles of 1919. Chapter XII of the treaty included a series of articles oriented to the facilitation of international communications and trade, main reason for the celebration of this conference.

== Decisions ==
The results of the conference were the following conventions and international instruments.:

- Convention and Statute on Freedom of Transit
- Convention and Statute on the Regime of Navigable Waterways of International Concern
- Declaration recognising the Right to a Flag of States having no Sea-coast
- Recommendations on the International Regime of Maritime Ports
- Recommendations on the International Regime of Railways

The originals of these instruments, of which the Secretary-General of the United Nations is the depositary, are currently in the League of Nations Archives, at the Palais des Nations, in Geneva.

== History ==
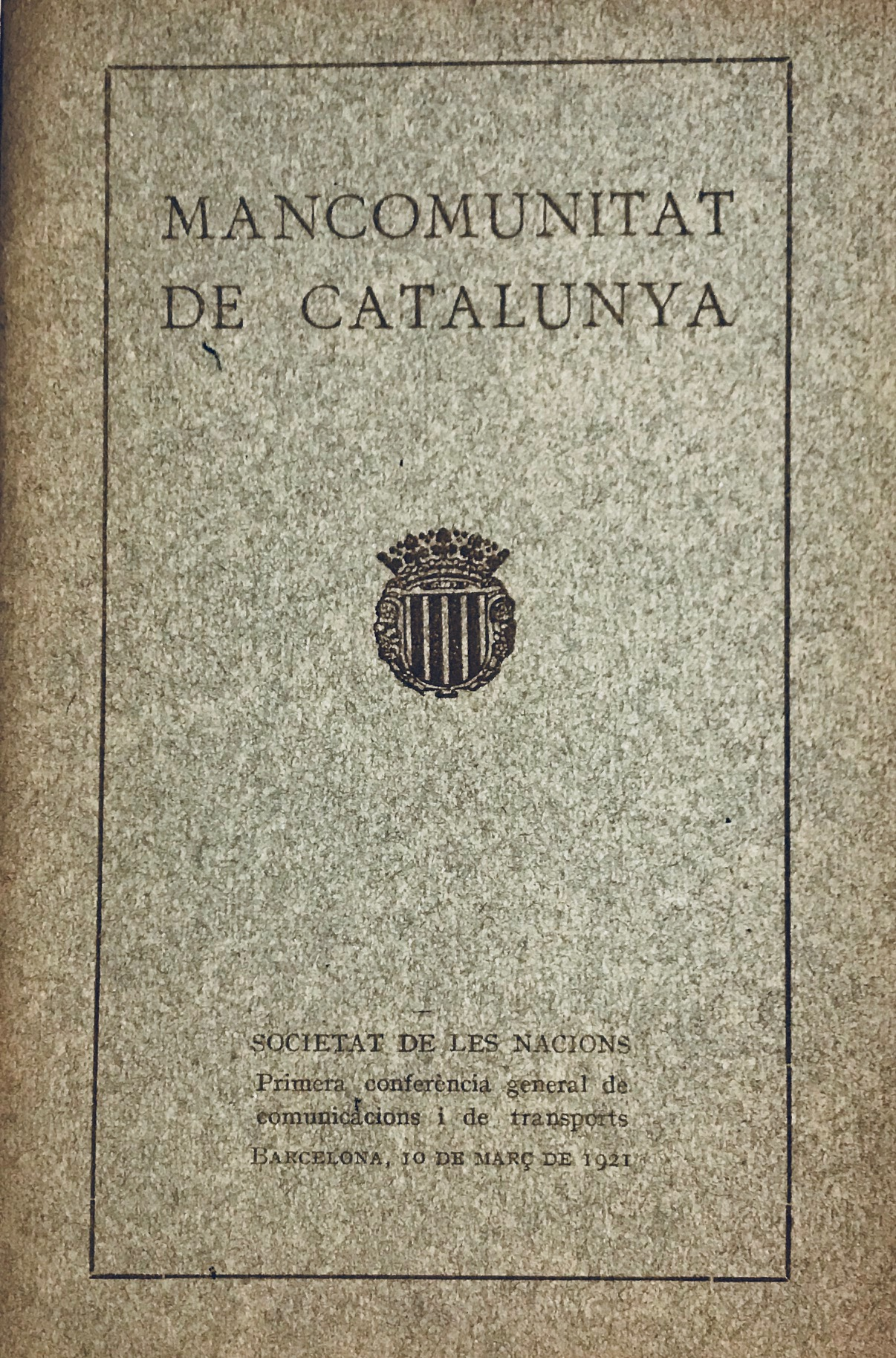
Pamphlet distributed to all delegates by the Mancomunitat de Catalunya with practical information regarding the arrangements of the Conference

The seat of the conference was a dual one. The plenary meetings were held at the Saló de Cent of the Barcelona City Council; however, the heart of the Conference, i.e. the sessions in committees, working groups, as well as the offices of the Presidency and the Secretariat, the reproduction and distribution of documents, among others, where hosted in the Palace of the Generalitat, much of which had been ceded for this reason by the President of the Mancomunitat de Catalunya, Josep Puig i Cadafalch.

This summit mobilized around four hundred people among diplomats, experts, League of Nations officials and journalists; as well as staff from the Mancomunitat, the Barcelona City Council and the Spanish Ministry of State who were seconded to give support to this international meeting. The conference was chaired by the French historian and statesman Gabriel Hanotaux and was attended by, among others, figures such as Jean Monnet, then Undersecretary General of the League of Nations, the jurist Sir Cecil Hurst, and -among others- the ministers of transports or public works of France, Yves Le Trocquer, Italy, Camillo Peano, or the one of Belgium, Xavier Neujean. The Catalan journalist, Eugeni Xammar, who was then working for the Information Section of the League of Nations, was one of the key persons in the organization this conference; in which a young Salvador de Madariaga also made his debut.

== Legacy ==
On February 16, 2021, by agreement of the Government of Catalonia, it was decided to celebrate the centennial of this conference as one of the institutional commemorations of the Generalitat (Government of Catalonia) for the year 2021
