= Howard Sachs =

Howard Sachs may refer to:

- Howard F. Sachs (born 1925), United States judge
- Howard Sachs (scientist) (1926–2011), American biochemist
