= Lilly Kahil =

French-Swiss archaeologist and scholar

Lilly Kahil

Lilly Louise Kahil (2 July 1926 – 4 December 2002) was a Swiss-French archaeologist and classicist of Egyptian-German descent. She was the founder of the Lexicon Iconographicum Mythologiae Classicae, an encyclopedia of ancient Greek, Etruscan and Roman mythology.

== Life ==
Lilly Kahil was born on 2 July 1926 in Zürich. Her mother was German, while her father belonged to a Melkite Egyptian family. Her father's sister, Mary Kahil, was known for her inter-faith dialogues with Louis Massignon, an Islamologist. She spent her youth in Egypt. During her childhood, she suffered a long illness, was taught at home by private teachers and took her baccalaurét at the age of sixteen. She attended Cairo's Sacred Heart Convent. August 1945 she and her sister went to Europe for higher studies. She studied for a year at the University of Basel with Karl Schefold, after which she attended the Sorbonne, where she received a degree in literature (1947) and a higher diploma in classical studies (1948).

Kahil joined the French School at Athens, during which she prepared her doctoral thesis, titled Les enlèvements et le retour d'Hélène dans les texte et les documents figurés. She defended her dissertation at Sorbonne in 1954. It won the Salomon Reinach prize of the Académie des Inscriptions et Belles-Lettres, and was published the following year.

In 1963 her family left Egypt following expropriation by Nasser's regime.

Kahil was first married to Boutros Boutros-Ghali, who would later become Secretary-General of the United Nations. During this period, she went by the name of Ghali-Kahil. Her second marriage was to Prof. René Ginouvès, a French archaeologist, whereupon she reverted to her maiden name.

Following a long illness, Kahil died on 4 December 2002 in Garches.

== Career ==
Lilly Kahil was a research associate at CNRS between 1955 and 1957. She became a professor at the University of Fribourg between 1957 and 1969. She was a professor at the University of Paris X-Nanterre for the next ten years, following which she was appointed Director of Research at CNRS.

Kahil specialised in archaeology, the history of religions and mythology. She worked with the Swiss School of Archaeology in Greece at the excavations at Eretria in 1964 and 1978. She also conducted digs at Soloi in Cyprus and Laodicea on the Lycus, as well as at Thasos on behalf of the French School of Athens, publishing a report on the ceramics there in 1967.

She was one of the first archaeologists to develop an in-depth study of Geometric art in Greek ceramics, including those from Euboean workshops. A major contribution was on the iconography on vases found at the temple of Artemis in Brauron.

Kahil also conducted archaeological digs on behalf of the Institute of Advanced Study. Her last project, a study of the white ground technique used on lekythos at the Louvre, remained unfinished at her death.

=== Lexicon Iconographicum Mythologiae Classicae ===
During her professorship at Paris X-Nanterre, Kahil initiated a programme to document ancient Greek, Etruscan and Roman mythology. The encyclopedia in twenty volumes, titled Lexicon Iconographicum Mythologiae Classicae, was published between 1981 and 2009. She served as its secretary-general, and wrote several articles for it, notably those on Artemis and Helen. She established a network of academic organisations for the project, and set up a foundation based in Switzerland. Related conferences were organised at Thessaloniki in 1993, in Basel in 1994, Malibu in 1995 and at Oxford in 1996 towards the publication of the Thesaurus Cultus et Rituum Antiquorum, a systematic dictionary that has become a reference work on the cults and rites of ancient religions.

== Selected works ==
- Lilly Kahil (1955). Les enlèvements et le retour d'Hélène dans les texte et les documents figurés. Paris: Éditions de Boccard.
- Lilly Kahil (1960). La céramique grecque: Études thasiennes. Vol. VII. Paris: Éditions de Boccard.
- Lilly Kahil (1964). Grèce préhistorique et archaïque. Images des grandes civilisations. Vol. 4. Lausanne: Éditions Rencontre.
- Lilly Kahil (1964). Grèce. Le ve siècle av. J.-C. Images des grandes civilisations. Vol. 5. Lausanne: Éditions Rencontre.
- Lilly Kahil (1968). "Céramiques géométriques et subgéométriques d'Érétrie". In Claude Bérard (ed.). Eretria: L'Hérôon à la porte de l'ouest. Vol. III. Francke Berne. p. 100.
- Lilly Kahil; Jean de Gagniers (1969). Laodicée du Lycos: Le nymphée. Campagnes 1961-1963. Paris: Éditions de Boccard.
- Lilly Kahil; Serapheim Charitōnidēs; René Ginouvès (1970). Les mosaïques de la maison du Ménandre à Mytilène. l'Art Antique. Vol. supplément 6. Bâle: Francke.
- Lilly Kahil; Christiane Dunant (1980). Du Corpus vasorum antiquorum. Genève, Musée d'art et d'histoire. Vol. 3. Berne: P. Lang. ISBN 3-261-00466-5.
- Lilly Kahil; Christian Augé, eds. (1 January 1981). La Mythologie gréco-romaine, de mythologies périphériques. Études d'iconographie. Colloques internationaux du Centre national de la recherche scientifique. Vol. 593. Paris: CNRS. ISBN 2-222-02692-X.
- Lilly Kahil; Christian Augé; Pascale Linant de Bellefonds, eds. (1986). Iconographie classique et identités régionales. Bulletin de correspondance hellénique. Vol. supplément 14. Paris: Diffusion de Boccard. ISBN 2-869-58003-7.
- Lilly Kahil; Pascale Linant de Bellefonds, eds. (1991). La Religion, la mythologie, iconographie. Mélanges de l'École française de Rome. Vol. 103. Palais Farnèse, Rome: École française de Rome.
- Lilly Kahil (1991). "Le sacrifice d'Iphigénie". Religion, mythologie, iconographie - actes du colloque international, Rome). Mélanges de l’École française de Rome. 103 (1). École française de Rome: 183–196.

== Awards and honours ==
- 1954: Salomon Rainach prize of the Académie des Inscriptions et Belles-Lettres.
- 1985: Gustave Mendel prize of the Académie des Inscriptions et Belles-Lettres.
- 1989: Honorary Member of the Archaeological Society of Athens.
- 1989: Foreign Honorary Member of the Archaeological Institute of America.
