= 1926 Dutch Senate election =

- 30 July 1926
- 25 of the 50 seats in the Senate; 26 seats needed for a majority
Party	Leader	Vote %	Seats	+/–
RKSP		20.54	16	0
SDAP		22.09	11	0
ARP		19.48	7	−1
CHU		14.46	7	0
LSP		14.39	6	+1
VDB		7.13	3	0
This lists parties that won seats. See the complete results below.
President of the Senate before	President of the Senate after
Jan Joseph Godfried van Voorst tot Voorst; AB	Jan Joseph Godfried van Voorst tot Voorst; AB

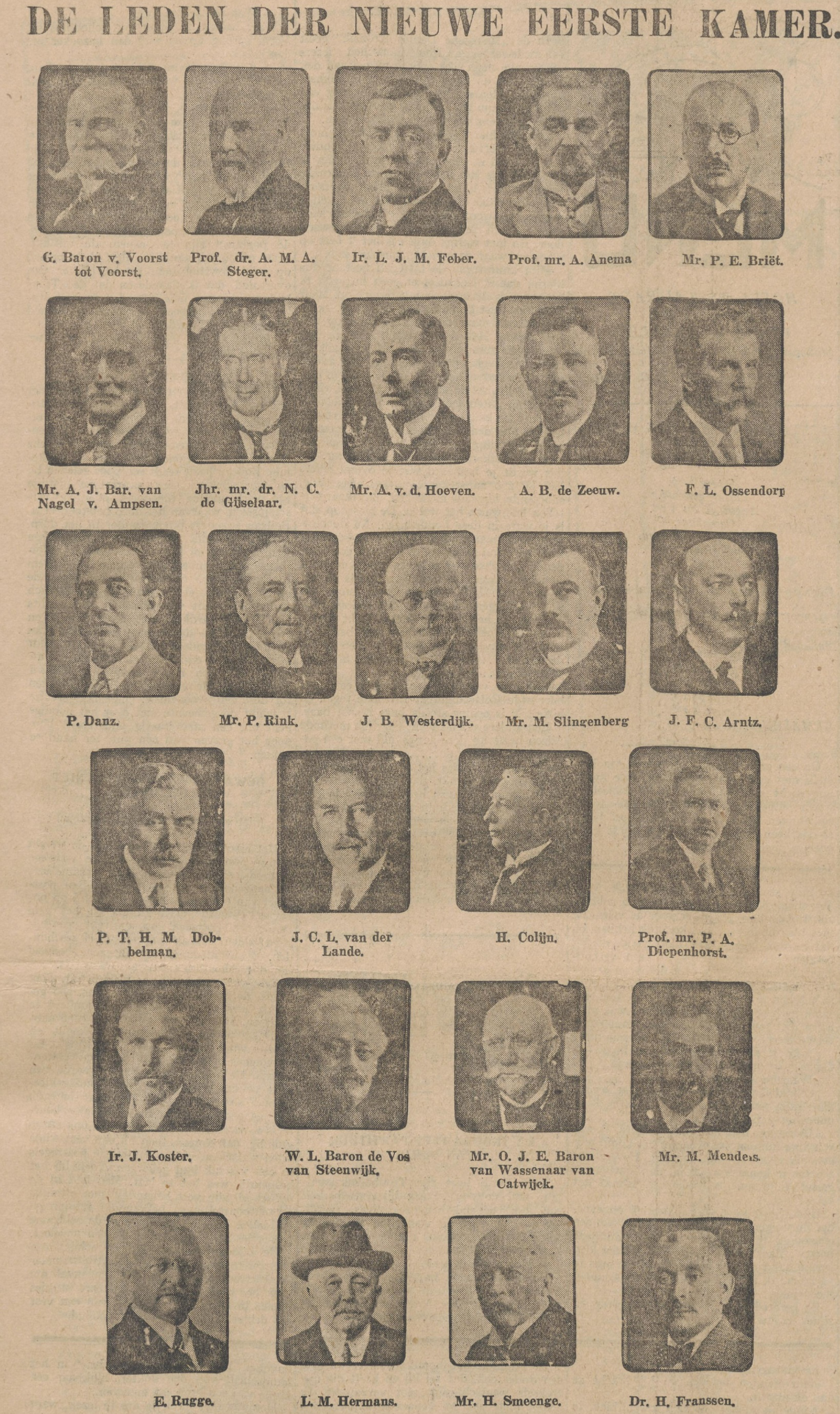
Elected Senators

Elections for 25 out of 50 seats in the Senate of the Netherlands were held on 30 July 1926. All seats in electoral group II comprising the provinces of Gelderland, Overijssel, Groningen and Drenthe, and electoral group IV comprising the province of South Holland, were up for election.

Within each electoral group, Senators were elected by provincial councils using party-list proportional representation. Provincial councillors' votes were weighted to their province's population.

The incumbent Coalition government retained a comfortable majority of 30 seats, down from 31. The Anti-Revolutionary Party lost one seat to the Liberal State Party in group IV.

== Results ==
1926 Senate election
Party	Unweighted		Weighted		Seats			
Party	Votes	%	Votes	%	Won	Not up	Total	+/−
Social Democratic Workers' Party	57	22.09	7,309	22.09	6	5	11	0
Roman Catholic State Party	51	19.77	6,796	20.54	5	11	16	0
Anti-Revolutionary Party	49	18.99	6,446	19.48	4	3	7	−1
Christian Historical Union	37	14.34	4,786	14.46	4	3	7	0
Liberal State Party	40	15.50	4,762	14.39	4	2	6	+1
Free-thinking Democratic League	20	7.75	2,360	7.13	2	1	3	0
Reformed Political Party	4	1.55	631	1.91	0	0	0	0
Total	258	100.00	33,090	100.00	25	25	50	0
Valid votes	258	100.00	33,090	100.00				
Invalid/blank votes	0	0.00	0	0.00				
Total votes	258	100.00	33,090	100.00				
Registered voters/turnout	271	95.20	34,786	95.12				
Source: Staatscourant

=== By electoral group ===
1926 Senate election in electoral group II
Party	Unweighted		Weighted		Seats	+/–
Party	Votes	%	Votes	%	Seats	+/–
Roman Catholic State Party	37	20.56	3,883	23.02	3	0
Social Democratic Workers' Party	39	21.67	3,565	21.14	3	0
Anti-Revolutionary Party	32	17.78	2,910	17.25	2	0
Christian Historical Union	26	14.44	2,498	14.81	2	0
Liberal State Party	29	16.11	2,474	14.67	2	0
Free-thinking Democratic League	15	8.33	1,320	7.83	1	0
Reformed Political Party	2	1.11	215	1.27	0	0
Total	180	100.00	16,865	100.00	13	0
Valid votes	180	100.00	16,865	100.00		
Invalid/blank votes	0	0.00	0	0.00		
Total votes	180	100.00	16,865	100.00		
Registered voters/turnout	189	95.24	17,730	95.12		
Source: Staatscourant

1926 Senate election in electoral group IV
Party	Unweighted		Weighted		Seats	+/–
Party	Votes	%	Votes	%	Seats	+/–
Social Democratic Workers' Party	18	23.08	3,744	23.08	3	0
Anti-Revolutionary Party	17	21.79	3,536	21.79	2	−1
Roman Catholic State Party	14	17.95	2,912	17.95	2	0
Christian Historical Union	11	14.10	2,288	14.10	2	0
Liberal State Party	11	14.10	2,288	14.10	2	+1
Free-thinking Democratic League	5	6.41	1,040	6.41	1	0
Reformed Political Party	2	2.56	416	2.56	0	0
Total	78	100.00	16,224	100.00	12	0
Valid votes	78	100.00	16,224	100.00		
Invalid/blank votes	0	0.00	0	0.00		
Total votes	78	100.00	16,224	100.00		
Registered voters/turnout	82	95.12	17,056	95.12		
Source: Staatscourant
