= Howard Sachs (scientist) =

American biochemist

- Born: July 12, 1926. Brooklyn, NY
- Died: December 6, 2011 (aged 85)
- Occupation(s): Biochemist and M.D.
- Known for: Pioneer of neuroendocrinology

Howard Sachs (July 12, 1926 – December 6, 2011), was a biochemist who helped pioneer the study of neuroendocrinology. His discoveries concerning the production of the hormone vasopressin laid the foundation for the field of hormone biosynthesis.

== Early life and education ==
Sachs was born in the Brownsville, Brooklyn in New York City on July 1, 1926, to Leo and Bessie Sachs. He attended Stuyvesant High School in Manhattan. During World War II, Sachs served in Okinawa from 1944 to 1946. He attended Brooklyn College on the G.I. Bill, graduating with a B.S. in 1949. He earned an M.A. in organic chemistry from Columbia University in 1950 and a Ph.D. in biochemistry from Columbia in 1953, under the supervision of Professor Erwin Brand.

== Scientific career ==
Sachs joined the faculty at Case Western Reserve University in 1957 and was made a full professor in 1966. He left Case Western Reserve to become the section chief of neurochemistry at The Roche Institute of Molecular Biology. Through his research, Sachs discovered the relationship between neurophysin, an intracellular chaperone protein and vasopressin, the neurohormone that is critical for maintaining water balance in the body. He hypothesized that neurophysin and vasopressin are both part of a larger, inactive precursor protein, a prohormone, which is then enzymatically cleaved and processed within the secretory granule to produce and secrete both peptide products. Sachs' hypothesis preceded the discovery of proinsulin by 3 years, and his research laid the foundation for understanding the biosynthesis of all brain peptides and many proteins, which are major constituents involved in brain and neuroendocrine functions. Sachs showed that vasopressin was first synthesized as a prohormone in specialized nerve cells (called neurosecretory cells) in the hypothalamus and was then transported to the nerve terminals in the posterior pituitary where the vasopressin peptide was completely processed during axonal transport in secretory granules and ultimately secreted into the blood. He also showed that brain tissue could be kept intact and functional for two months in tissue culture, and contributed to the understanding of the interactions between the neuroendocrine neurons and neuroglial cells in the hypothalamal-neurohypophysial system (HNS).

== Medical career ==
At the height of his research career, Sachs left The Roche Institute of Molecular Biology to go to medical school. In 1976 he received an M.D. from Case Western Reserve University School of Medicine.
