= Convention and Statute on the International Régime of Maritime Ports =

1923 multilateral treaty

The Convention and Statute on the International Régime of Maritime Ports is a 1923 League of Nations multilateral treaty whereby port states agree to treat ships equally, regardless of the nationality of the ship.

The Convention was concluded in Geneva on 9 December 1923 and entered into force on 26 July 1926. The states that ratify the Convention agree to allow all ships the freedom to access maritime ports and to not discriminate against ships based on the maritime flag the ship flies. The Convention remains in force and forms of the basis of the expectation at international law of equal treatment in maritime ports.

The Convention was most recently ratified in 2001, by Saint Vincent and the Grenadines. Thailand ratified the Convention in 1925 but denounced it in 1973.

== See also ==
- Barcelona Convention and Statute on the Regime of Navigable Waterways of International Concern
