= Barcelona Convention and Statute on the Regime of Navigable Waterways of International Concern =

1921 multilateral treaty

The Barcelona Convention and Statute on the Regime of Navigable Waterways of International Concern is a multilateral treaty that was concluded at Barcelona on 20 April 1921. Its purpose is to ensure freedom of navigation in waterways (i.e. ports, rivers and artificial canals) which bear international significance. It was registered in League of Nations Treaty Series on 8 October 1921. It went into effect on 31 October 1922. The convention is still in force.

== Terms of the convention ==
The convention merely reaffirmed the statute adopted the day before at a League of Nations conference held in Barcelona. Article 1 of the statute defined the term "navigable waterways of international concern" as any waterway that is connected to the sea and traversing through one or more sovereign states. Article 2 stated the convention shall also apply to waterways for which international commissions have been established. Article 3 obligated governments to allow free movement for in its waterways to vessels of any state whose government signed the convention. Article 4 required equal treatment for all nationalities in applying the freedom of navigation. Article 5 allowed some exceptions to the principles of freedom of navigation if a government chose to give priority to its own nationals in certain cases, conditional on the absence of any agreements to the contrary. Article 6 allowed governments to apply their rule of law in waterways under their control. Article 7 prohibited governments to levy any dues for passage in international waterways under their control, except for minimal dues necessary for the maintenance of the said above waterways. Article 8 prohibited governments from levying customs for goods passing through their territories, and stated that the principles of the Barcelona Convention and Statute on Freedom of Transit shall also apply to maritime navigation. Article 9 obligated governments to grant equal treatment to all foreign nationals in using their ports, with some exceptions. Article 10 obligated the governments controlling waterways to maintain them regularly to allow smooth navigation.

Article 11 dealt with states non signatory of the convention and their rights of use of the waterways. Article 12 stated that in case a waterway is divided between two or more states, the responsibility for the rule of law shall be divided according to territorial division of the waterway itself. Article 13 stated that previously signed agreements on navigation shall remain in force, but requested the governments involved not to implement provisions of such treaties if they conflicted with the convention. Article 14 regulated the work of international navigation commissions. Article 15 allowed exceptions in time of war. Article 16 stated that none of the statute's provisions shall conflict with obligations under the Covenant of the League of Nations. Article 17 stated the statute did not apply to war or police vessels. Article 18 prohibited governments to make navigation arrangements that were in conflict with the statute or convention. Article 19 allowed to make exceptions in times of national emergency. Article 20 allowed governments to grant greater freedom of navigation that provided for in the statute, if they chose to do so.

Article 21 allowed governments to make exceptions in implementation of freedom of navigation, in cases of part or all of their waterways were still affected by destruction caused during the First World War. Article 22 provided for resolution of disputes regarding interpretation through the Permanent Court of International Justice. Article 23 allowed governments to exempt from freedom of navigation waterways or parts of them passing through under-populated or otherwise problematic areas under their control. Article 24 exempted waterways that are lying between two states and not being necessary for the passage into a third state that was non signatory of the convention. Article 25 stated that different arrangements shall apply in League of Nations mandated territories.

== See also ==
- Barcelona Convention and Statute on Freedom of Transit
- Convention and Statute on the International Régime of Maritime Ports
- Declaration recognising the Right to a Flag of States having no Sea-coast
