= Barcelona Convention and Statute on Freedom of Transit =

1921 international treaty

The Barcelona Convention and Statute on Freedom of Transit is an International treaty signed in Barcelona on 20 April 1921; the treaty ensures freedom of transit for various commercial goods across national boundaries. It was registered in League of Nations Treaty Series on 8 October 1921. It went into effect on 31 October 1922. The convention is still in force at present.

== Terms of the convention ==
The convention merely reaffirmed the statute adopted few days earlier at a League of Nations conference held in Barcelona. Article 1 of the statute defined transit as movement of persons and goods from one sovereign state to another. Article 2 recognized the freedom of sovereign governments to make transit arrangements within their territories. Article 3 prohibited governments from demanding payments for transit rights, except for dues designated to cover operational expenses. Article 4 made compulsory for governments to apply equal transit dues to all persons, regardless of nationality. Article 5 permitted governments to prevent the entry into their territories of certain persons or goods for reasons of security. Article 6 permitted governments to refrain from granting transit permission to persons of states that were non-signatories of the convention. Article 7 permitted governments to deviate from the provisions of the statute in cases of national emergency, but required this be done for as brief period as possible. Article 8 allowed exceptions in times of war. Article 9 stated that none of its provisions can contradict obligations of states within the League of Nations. Article 10 stated that the statute shall replace all other transit agreements concluded prior to 1 May 1921. Article 11 permitted governments to grant greater freedoms of transit than provided in the statute, if they chose to do so. Article 12 permitted governments to postpone temporarily the applications of the transit provisions in case their territory or parts of it still suffered from the devastation caused by the First World War. Article 13 provided for resolution of disputes regarding interpretation through the Permanent Court of International Justice. Article 14 permitted governments to refrain from applying reasonable transit provisions to territories that were either under populated or lacking in proper arrangements of the rule of law. Article 15 stated that different arrangements shall apply in League of Nations mandated territories.

== Table of ratifications ==
Country	Ratified
Albania	1921-10-08
Antigua and Barbuda	1988-10-25
Austria	1923-11-15
Belgium	1927-05-16
Bosnia	1993-09-01
Bulgaria	1922-07-11
Cambodia	1971-04-12
Chile	1928-03-19
Croatia	1992-08-03
Czech Republic	1996-02-09
Denmark	1922-11-13
Estonia	1925-06-06
Fiji	1972-03-15
Finland	1923-01-29
France	1924-09-19
Georgia	1999-06-02
Germany	1924-04-09
Greece	1924-02-18
Hungary	1928-05-18
India	1922-08-02
Iran	1931-01-29
Iraq	1930-03-01
Italy	1922-08-05
Japan	1924-02-20
Laos	1956-11-24
Latvia	1923-09-29
Lesotho	1973-10-23
Luxembourg	1930-03-19
Malta	1966-05-13
Mauritius	1969-07-18
Nepal	1966-08-22
Netherlands	1924-04-17
New Zealand	1922-08-02
Nigeria	1967-11-03
Norway	1923-09-04
Poland	1924-10-08
Romania	1923-09-05
Rwanda	1965-02-10
Saint Vincent and the Grenadines	2001-09-05
Serbia (as Yugoslavia)	1930-05-07
Slovakia	1993-05-28
Slovenia	1992-07-06
Spain	1929-12-17
Swaziland	1969-11-24
Sweden	1925-01-19
Switzerland	1924-06-14
Thailand	1922-11-29
Turkey	1933-06-27
United Kingdom	1922-08-02
Zimbabwe	1998-12-01

== See also ==
- Barcelona Convention and Statute on the Regime of Navigable Waterways of International Concern
