= Declaration recognising the Right to a Flag of States having no Sea-coast =

1921 multilateral treaty

The Declaration recognising the Right to a Flag of States having no Sea-coast (French: Déclaration portant reconnaissance du droit au pavillon des États dépourvus de littoral) is a 1921 multilateral treaty that legally recognised that a land-locked state could be a maritime flag state; that is, that a land-locked state could register ships and sail them on the sea under its own flag.

As of 2013, over 50 states have ratified the Declaration, and international law recognises the right of any state to sail ships on the sea under its own flag. Today, land-locked states which have merchant vessel fleets include Armenia, Austria, Azerbaijan, Bolivia, Ethiopia, Hungary, Kazakhstan, Laos, Luxembourg, Mongolia, Moldova, Paraguay, Slovakia, Switzerland and Turkmenistan. Of these, only Ethiopia and Mongolia have no river or sea port from which the high sea can be reached.

Land-locked states with access to the Caspian Sea (Azerbaijan, Kazakhstan, Turkmenistan) can gain access to the Black, Baltic, and White Seas via the Unified Deep Water System of European Russia (UDWS) under international agreements. Currently, the tonnage of ships passing through the UDWS is up to 10,000 tons, allowing these states to use not only river-sea-class ships but also full-fledged sea vessels. The Black, Baltic, and White Seas have access to the ocean.

Many land-locked states exercise their right to be maritime flag states by lending Flags of convenience.

== Background ==
In the first two decades of the 20th century, it was unclear whether a land-locked state could register maritime ships and authorise them to sail under its flag. France, the United Kingdom, and Germany had argued that such a right could not exist because a land-locked state would be unable to control the behavior of ships bearing its flag, because of the state's inability to guarantee access ports and the sea. Before World War I, Switzerland had denied several requests from merchant ships to fly the Swiss flag.

== Creation, ratification, and effect ==
After World War I, the creation of several new landlocked states, such as Czechoslovakia, Austria, and Hungary, caused the Great Powers to reconsider the issue. The Treaty of Versailles included provisions under which Germany agreed to allow these landlocked states to transit goods and personnel freely across German territory to seaports, suggesting that such states may also have their own merchant vessels in those ports.

The Declaration was created to reflect the new consensus. It was concluded and signed on 20 April 1921 by 25 states in Barcelona, Spain, at the League of Nations Conference on Communications and Transit, as an addendum to the longer Barcelona Convention and Statute on the Regime of Navigable Waterways of International Concern, which was concluded on the same day. The Declaration entered into force immediately upon its signing.

== Text ==
The text of the Declaration states:

The undersigned, duly authorised for the purpose, declare that the States which they represent recognise the flag flown by the vessels of any State having no sea-coast which are registered at some one specified place situated in its territory; such place shall serve as the port of registry of such vessels.
Barcelona, April 20th, 1921, done in a single copy of which the English and French texts shall be authentic.

== See also ==
- Flag of convenience (exploited by landlocked Moldova, Mongolia and Bolivia)
